= Brandywine School =

19th-20th century American artistic style

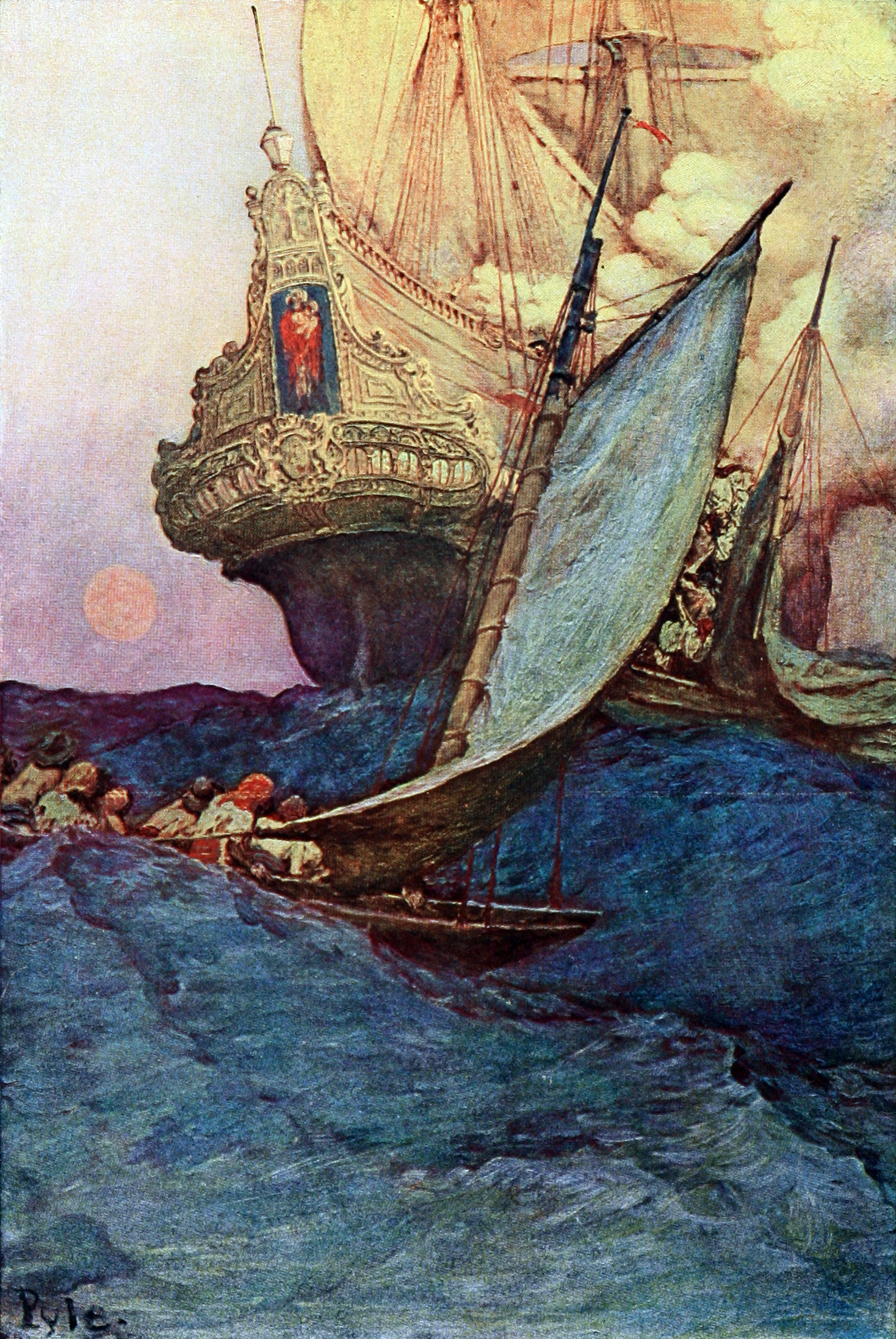
An illustration from Howard Pyle's Book of Pirates (1903) exemplifies the "Brandywine School" style.

The Brandywine School was a style of illustration—as well as an artists colony in Wilmington, Delaware and in Chadds Ford, Pennsylvania, near the Brandywine River—both founded by artist Howard Pyle (1853–1911) at the end of the 19th century. The works produced there were widely published in adventure novels, magazines, and romances in the early 20th century. Pyle’s teachings would influence such notable illustrators as N.C. Wyeth, Maxfield Parrish, Harvey Dunn, and Norman Rockwell. Pyle himself would come to be known as the "Father of American Illustration." Many works related to the Brandywine School may be seen at the Brandywine River Museum of Art, in Chadds Ford.

== History ==
Pyle, one of the foremost illustrators in the United States at the time, began teaching art classes at Drexel University in 1895. However, he was dissatisfied with the confines of formal art education, and beginning in 1898, he began teaching students during the summers at the Turner Mill in Chadds Ford. The mill, alongside the Brandywine, provided views of a scenic landscape to inspire the artists. Pyle also hosted artists' gatherings at his residence at Painter's Folly. In 1900, he left Drexel and opened his own school attached to his personal art studio.

Pyle created this school so that he might train a generation of illustrators who were artistically and financially successful. He hoped that through this, he would foster an American style of painting, something he felt the country lacked. In order to develop that intrinsically American style, Pyle believed that his students must spend time outdoors, taking in the scenery and the history of their country. To help facilitate this, Pyle frequently brought his students to Chadds Ford, where he would tell his students stories about the area’s revolutionary history while they painted landscapes. Pyle advocated against studying in Europe, hoping that his students would find fame and success through an American education.

The school and studio, which are still standing, are located a short walk from the Brandywine Park, a stretch of riverside park designed by Frederick Law Olmsted. Of the 500 students who applied to attend Pyle's school in its first year, only twelve were accepted.

It was through the absorption of Pyle's particular style and teaching that the tradition known as the "Brandywine School" emerged. Pyle continued to operate the school until 1910, during which time he was mentor to such successful artists as N. C. Wyeth, Frank E. Schoonover, Stanley M. Arthurs, William James Aylward, Thornton Oakley, Violet Oakley, Clifford Ashley, Anna Whelan Betts, Ethel Franklin Betts, Ellen Bernard Thompson Pyle, Jessie Willcox Smith, Olive Rush, Blanche Grant, Philip R. Goodwin, Allen Tupper True, and Harvey Dunn. In all, 75 artists were trained by Pyle during the ten years he ran his school in Wilmington.

The Brandywine School continued on in Pyle's students even after his death in 1911. Several of his students, inspired by Pyle's example, taught the next generation of the school's students.

In 1905, Wilmington philanthropist Samuel Bancroft constructed a set of buildings to house and provide studios for four of Pyle's most successful students: Wyeth, Schoonover, Dunn, and Ashley. Schoonover remained in his studio for the next 63 years, and in 1942 he used it to open his own school, where he taught artists such as Ellen du Pont Wheelwright. After Pyle's death, Arthurs purchased the Pyle studio and continued the school from 1912 to 1950. Wyeth stayed in his Wilmington studio for a time before moving to Chadds Ford, where he taught his own children, including artist Andrew Wyeth.

In his study The Brandywine Tradition (1968), author and illustrator Henry Clarence Pitz wrote of the movement's "concern for human values, . . . delight in the exercise of the pictorial imagination, the feeling that design should follow the behest of content and the conviction that the illustrator has a power over and a responsibility to his audience."

The style was a source of inspiration for, and used extensively by Disney previsualization artists for the animated film, Treasure Planet.

== Gallery ==
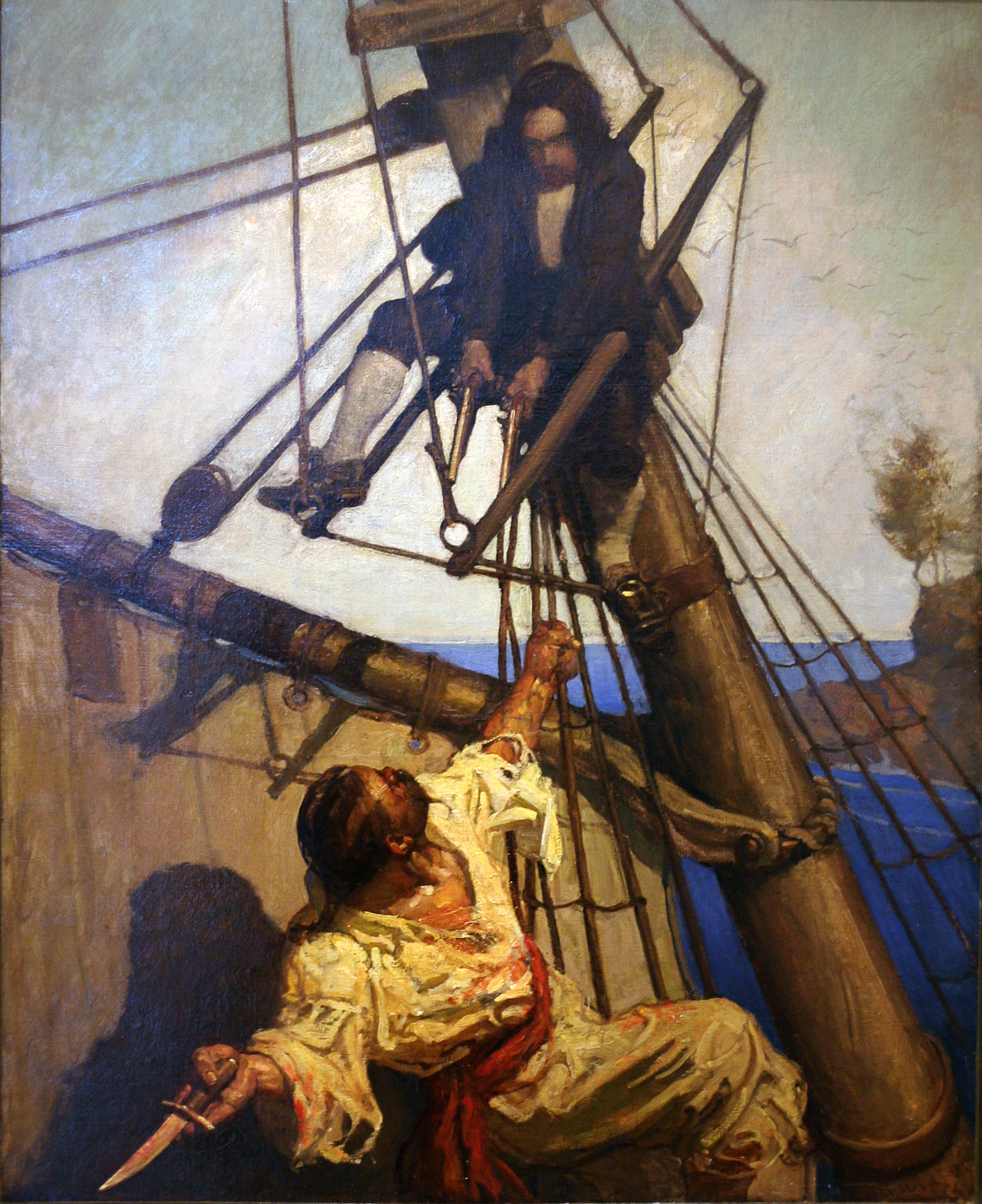

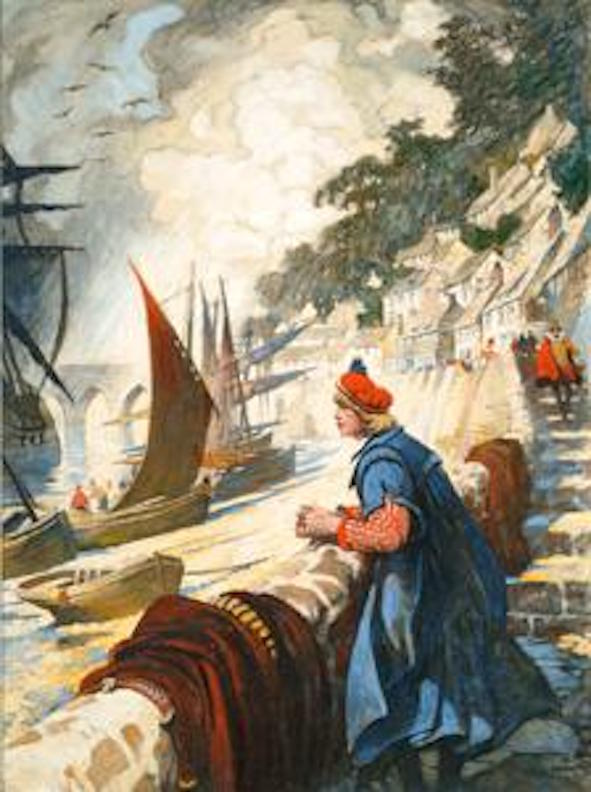

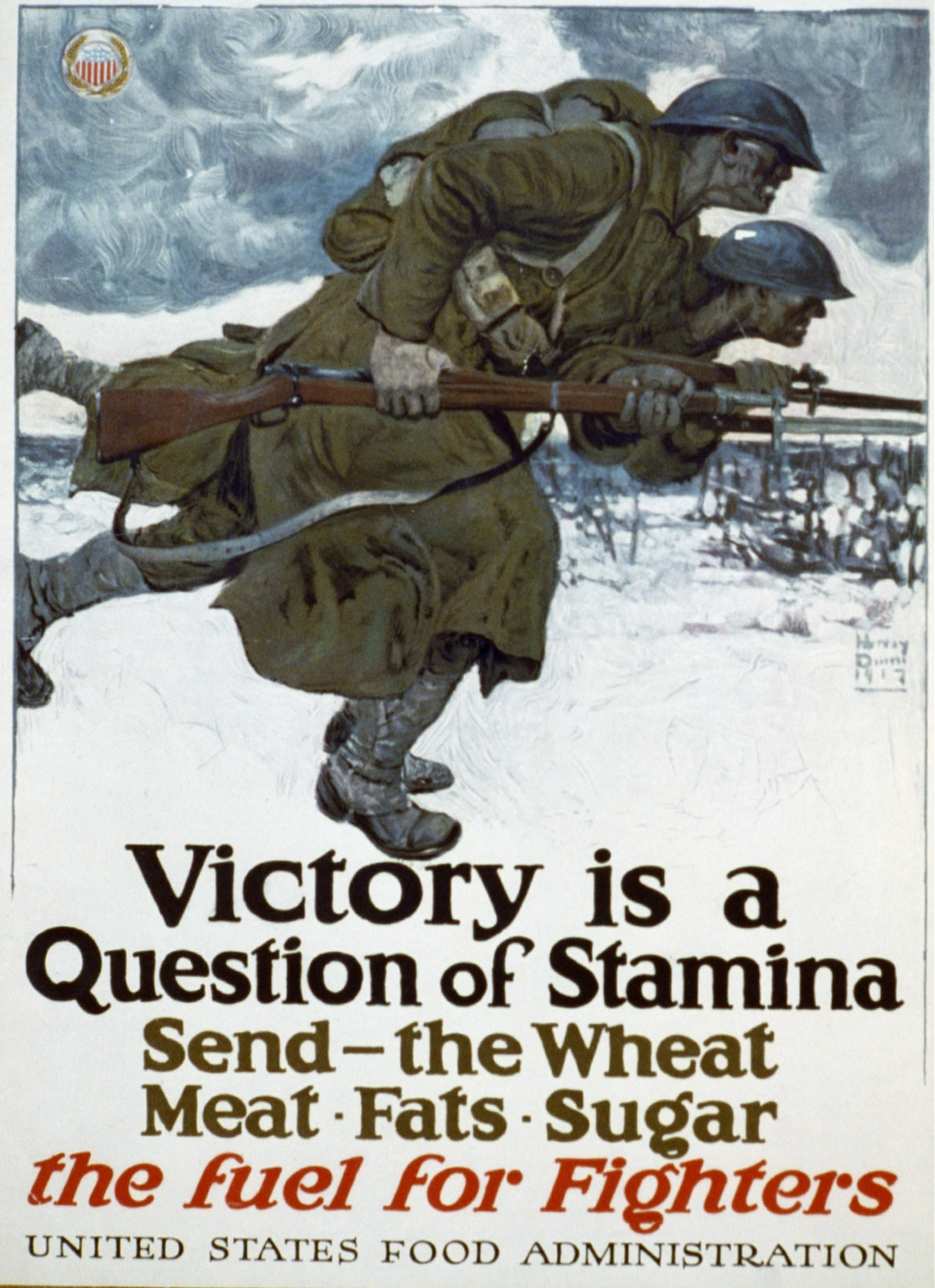

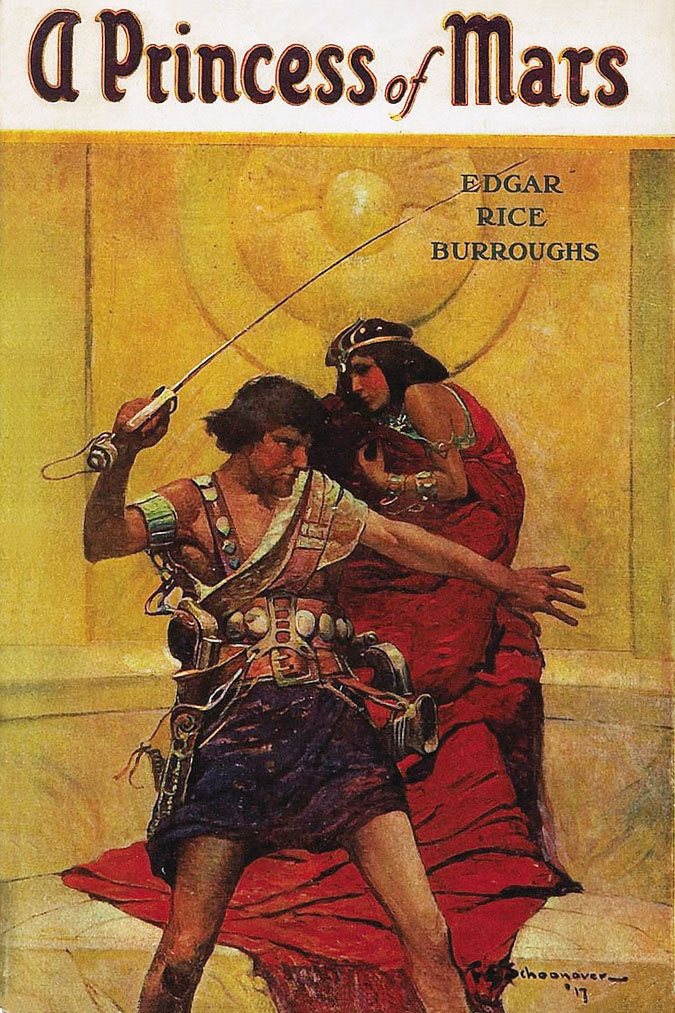

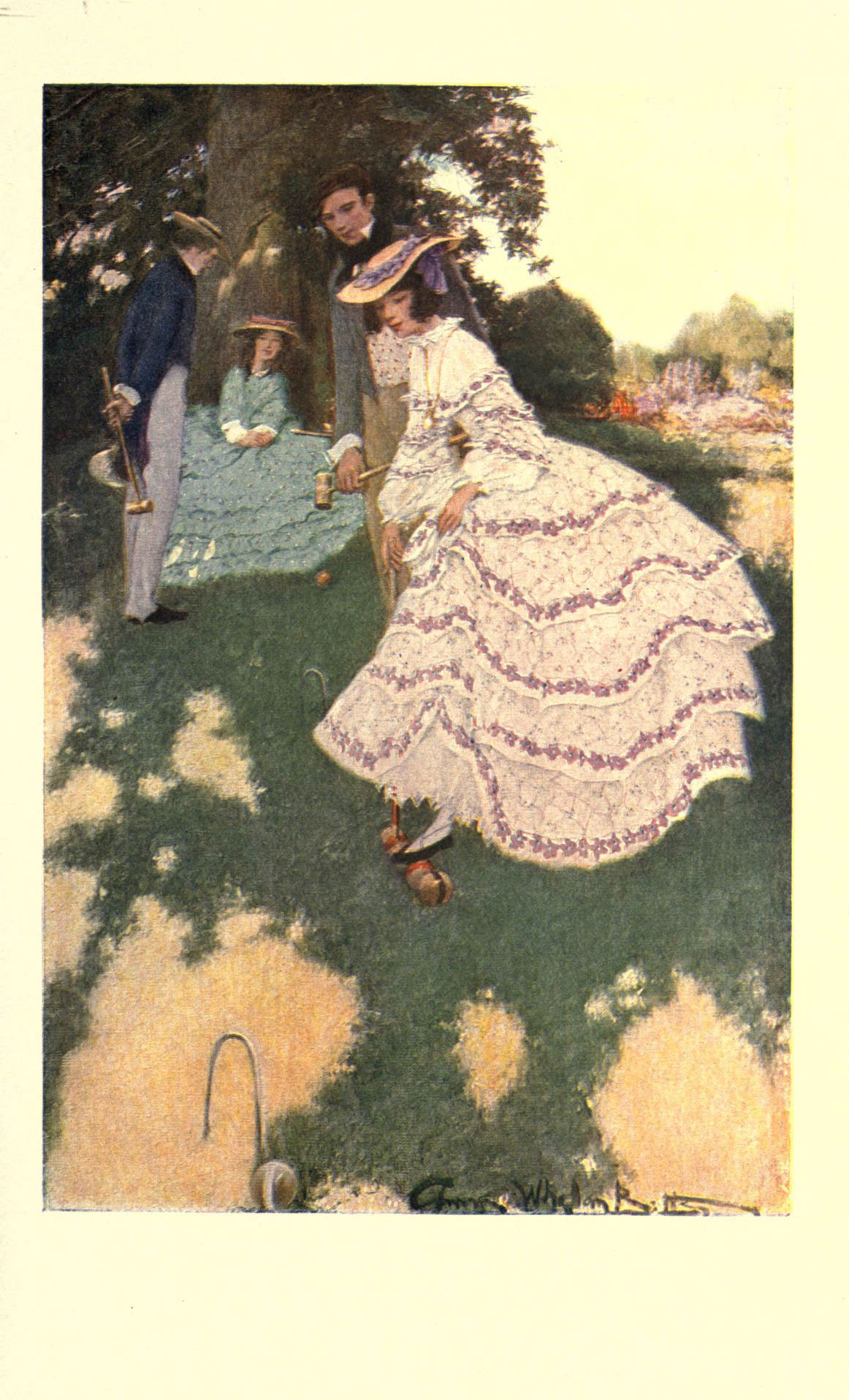

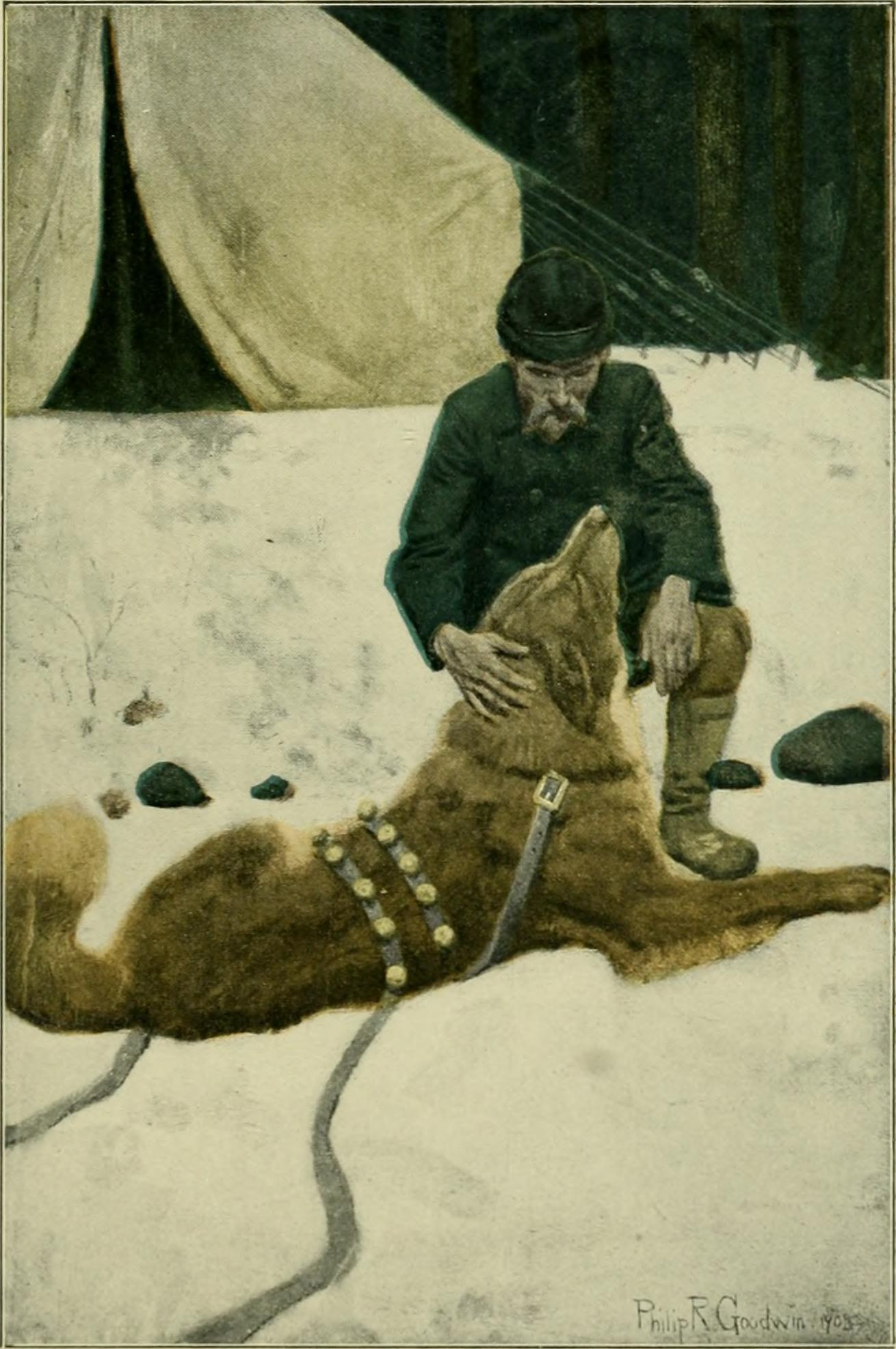

== List of artists associated with the Brandywine School ==
- Stanley M. Arthurs
- Clifford Ashley
- William James Aylward
- Anna Whelan Betts
- Ethel Franklin Betts
- Harvey Dunn
- Walter Hunt Everett
- Philip R. Goodwin
- Blanche Grant
- Thornton Oakley
- Violet Oakley
- Ellen Bernard Thompson Pyle
- Howard Pyle
- Robert Bernard Robinson
- Barclay Rubincam
- Olive Rush
- Frank E. Schoonover
- Jessie Willcox Smith
- Allen Tupper True
- Charles M. West Jr.
- Anne Warner West
- N. C. Wyeth

== See also ==
- Brandywine River Museum
- Delaware Art Museum
- Pennsylvania Impressionism
