= Samuel Bancroft =

American industrialist and art collector

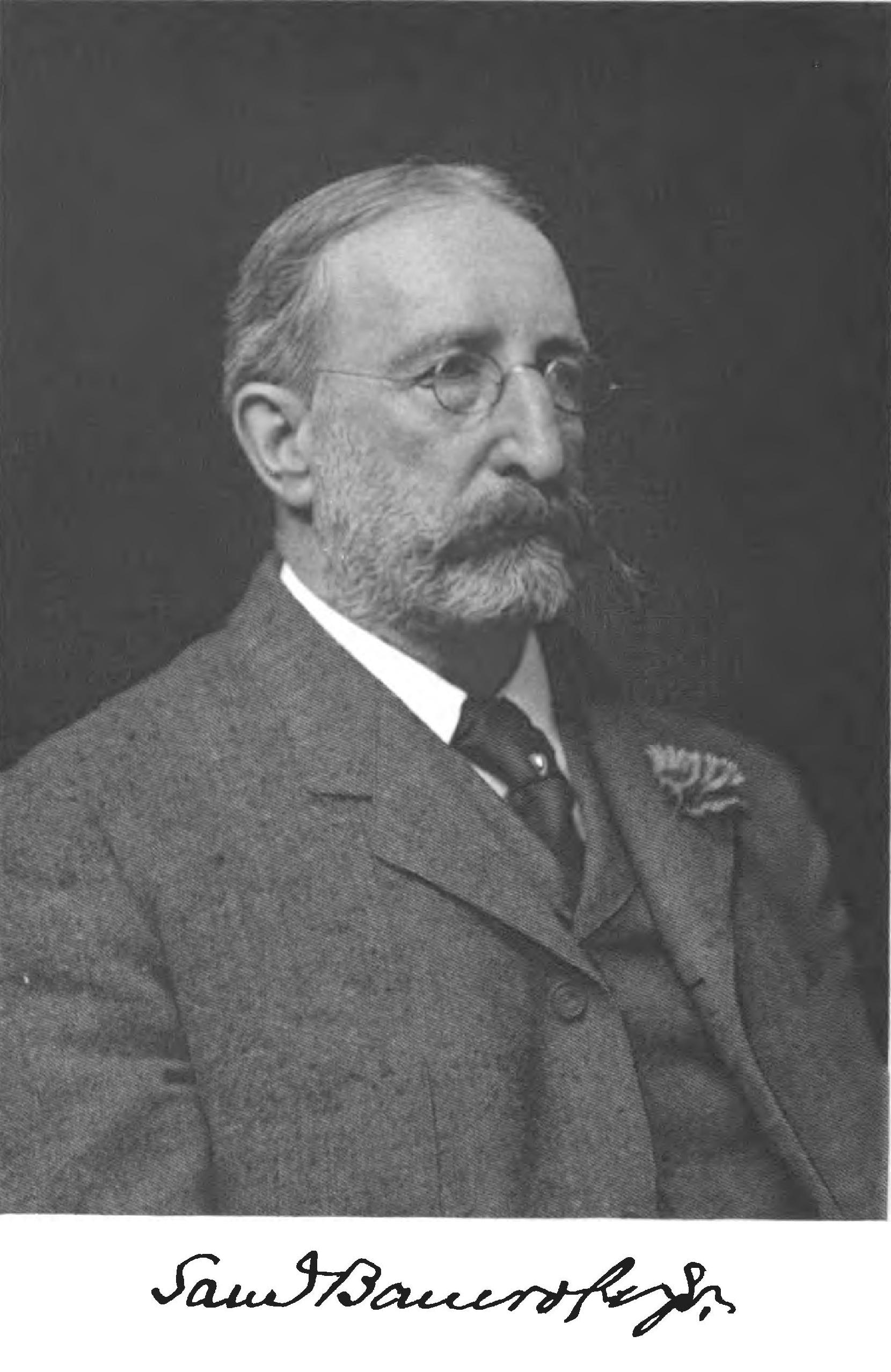
- Born: January 21, 1840; Wilmington, Delaware, United States
- Died: April 22, 1915 (aged 75); Philadelphia, Pennsylvania, United States
- Occupations: Industrialist & Art Philanthropist

Samuel Bancroft (January 21, 1840 – April 22, 1915) was an American industrialist as well as a major collector of Pre-Raphaelite Brotherhood artwork. His appreciation for art and his desire to give back to the community led to his becoming a prominent philanthropist in the early 20th century, particularly of the Brandywine School.

== Early life and career ==
Samuel Bancroft was born on January 21, 1840, in Wilmington, Delaware, United States. His father was Joseph Bancroft, a member of a prominent Quaker family who started his own milling company, Bancroft Mills, in 1831. His mother was Sarah Poole, the daughter of a Quaker miller and silversmith, William Poole. Samuel had an older brother, William, who was born in 1835.

Both of his parents were Quakers, and his father in particular was very religious and active in the Quaker community. Samuel was educated according to Joseph's religious values, and emphasized the importance of hard work in his children. Samuel began working at the family mills at a young age before he began receiving formal schooling at age ten from Samuel Alsop, a Wilmington Quaker. At twelve, he returned to the mills for apprenticeship there, and then attended the Wilmington Friends School for several years before resuming his apprenticeship.

The Civil War proved extremely profitable to the company due to increased demand for its products, and in 1865, when Bancroft was 25 years old, his father managed to pay off all of the company's business debts. This allowed Joseph to reorganize the company as Joseph Bancroft & Sons, making William and Samuel full partners. The partnership increased Bancroft's wealth dramatically, and the mills continued to grow and prosper, soon becoming the largest textile mill in the United States. The same year that Samuel was made a partner, he proposed to Mary Askew Richardson, a Wilmington resident. They were wed on June 8, 1865.

Joseph Bancroft died in 1874, leaving his two sons to run the company by themselves. As the mills continued to grow, Bancroft & Sons was incorporated in 1889. Samuel Bancroft became the president of the new company, and younger managers began handling many of the firm's day-to-day affairs. This allowed Bancroft the time to begin pursuing other interests.

== Philanthropy and art collection ==
Joseph Bancroft had immigrated to the United States from England, and many family members remained behind there. This close family connection led to Samuel's continuing interest in England, and in 1880, he was introduced to Pre-Raphaelite English artwork by his cousin, architect Alfred Darbyshire. He fell in love with the art, and once Bancroft stepped back from directly managing the family firm in 1889, he began to purchase numerous pieces of artwork.

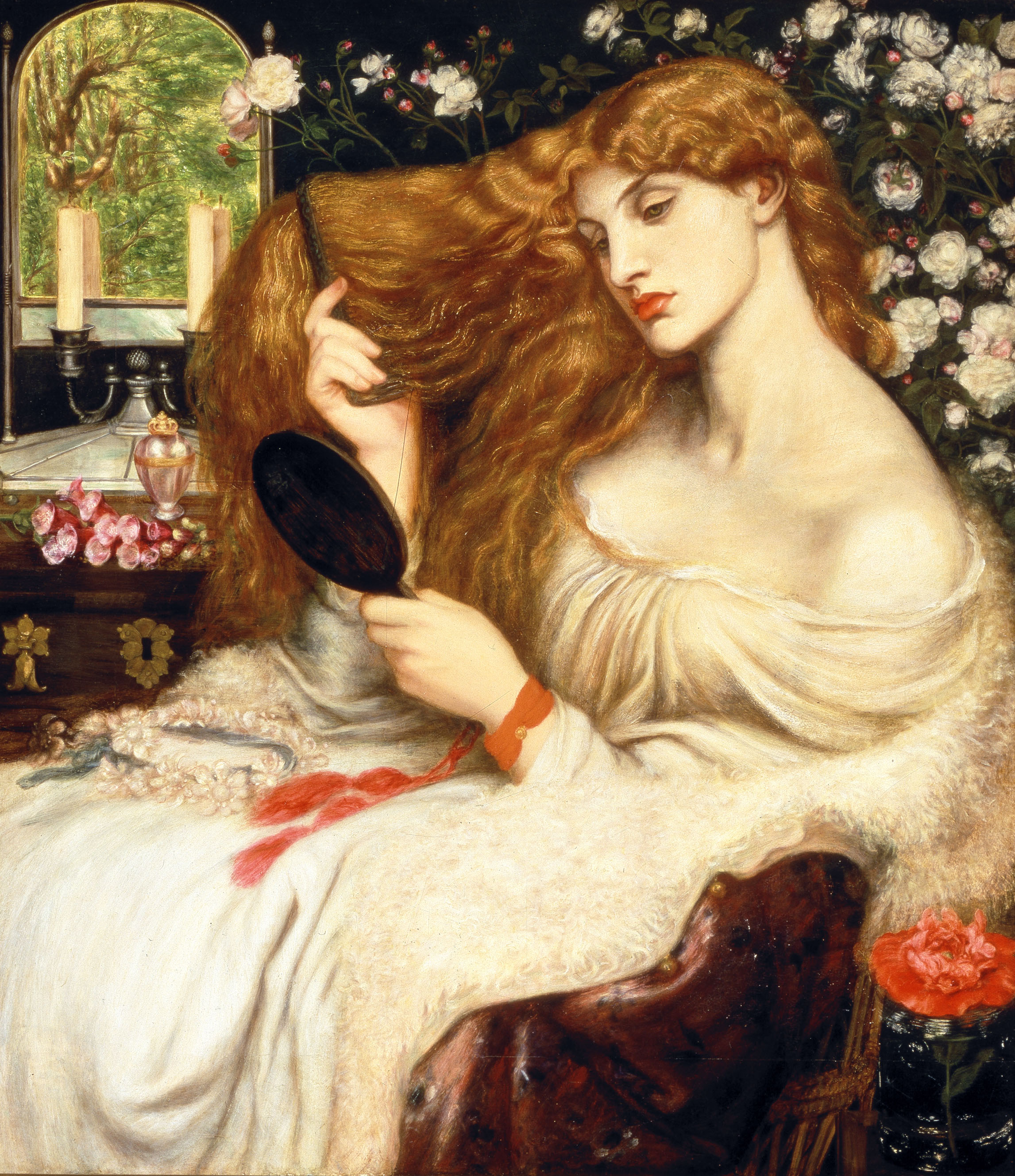
Lady Lilith by Dante Gabriel Rossetti, purchased by Samuel Bancroft in 1892

His collection began in 1890 with a work by Dante Gabriel Rossetti, whose art and poetry featured prominently in Bancroft's further collections over the next 25 years. He maintained correspondence with other artists in the movement, and offered financial support to the families of some of them. Bancroft also corresponded with critic, historian, and dealer Charles Fairfax Murray, also an important figure in the Pre-Raphaelite movement, and Murray helped advise Bancroft on future purchases. Bancroft continued adding to the collection for the remainder of his life, and built it into the largest collection of Pre-Raphaelite works outside England.

Bancroft was also very interested in the Brandywine School of art begun by local illustrator Howard Pyle. In 1903, he visited Pyle's classes where he observed the illustrator's students at work and received sketches from them. In 1905, Bancroft built homes and studios for four of the most prominent students of Pyle: N. C. Wyeth, Frank Schoonover, Harvey Dunn, and Clifford Warren Ashley.

== Death and legacy ==
Bancroft died on April 22, 1915. His children expanded on the collection and later, in seeking a way to memorialize their father, they contacted the Wilmington Society of the Fine Arts which had been founded after Howard Pyle's death to collect artwork related to Pyle and his students. In 1931, Bancroft's children donated the estate's collection of Pre-Raphaelite artwork to the Society and gave them land upon which to build a museum and an endowment to maintain it. This became the Delaware Art Museum.
