= Gayle Porter Hoskins =

American illustrator

Gayle Hoskins
- Born: Gayle Porter Hoskins; July 20, 1887; Brazil, Indiana, U.S.
- Died: January 14, 1962 (aged 74)
- Known for: Illustration

Gayle Porter Hoskins (July 20, 1887 – January 14, 1962) was an American illustrator. Hoskins began his training at the Chicago Art Institute and later studied under Howard Pyle in Wilmington, Delaware.

== Life and art ==
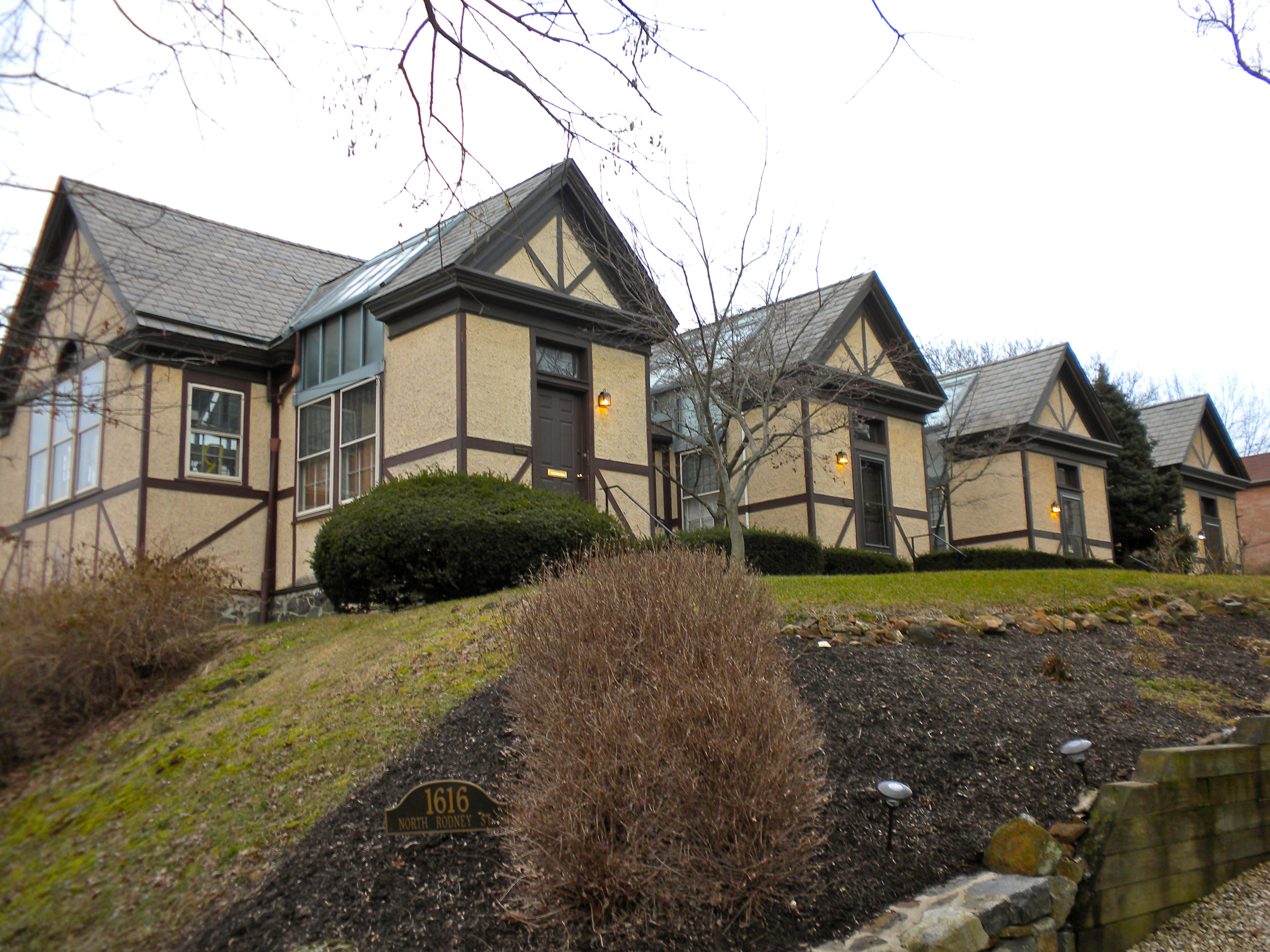
Frank E. Schoonover Studios at 1616 Rodney Street, Wilmington where Hoskins lived and worked.

He was born in Brazil, Indiana, to William "Pica" Thompson Hoskins, a sheet-music dealer, and Madge Porter Hoskins in 1887. The family moved to Denver, Colorado five years later. About 1901, he began publishing cartoons in the Denver Post. Three years later his mother died and the family moved back east to Chicago. Hoskins then studied at the School of the Art Institute of Chicago and studied under Charles Francis Browne, Frank Phoenix, Thomas Wood Stevens, and John Vanderpoel. He began working for Marshall Field and Company as a mural designer and published illustrations in Redbook in 1907.

Howard Pyle invited Hoskins to study at Pyle's school in Wilmington in 1907. Hoskins studied there until 1910 under Pyle and later under Frank Schoonover. He became a nationally known illustrator by 1918 publishing in Harper's Weekly, Good Housekeeping, Liberty, Saturday Evening Post, Cosmopolitan, and other magazines.

Hoskins married his first wife, Kathleen, in 1909. After a divorce, he married Alene Rollo on May 14, 1925. The couple moved into 1616 Rodney Street, a building of four combined art studios and apartments, now listed on the National Register of Historic Places.

For financial reasons he began working for pulp magazines after the Crash of 1929. His illustrations appeared on the covers of Western Story, Complete Stories, Top-Notch, Sure-Fire Western, Super Western, and Western Trails. After 1938 he stopped publishing in the pulps, preferring portraits and historical subjects instead.

== Gallery ==
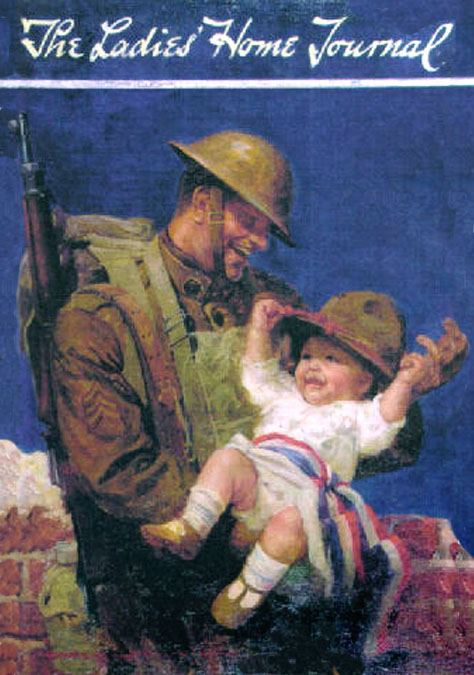
Ladies Home Journal Magazine Cover January 1919

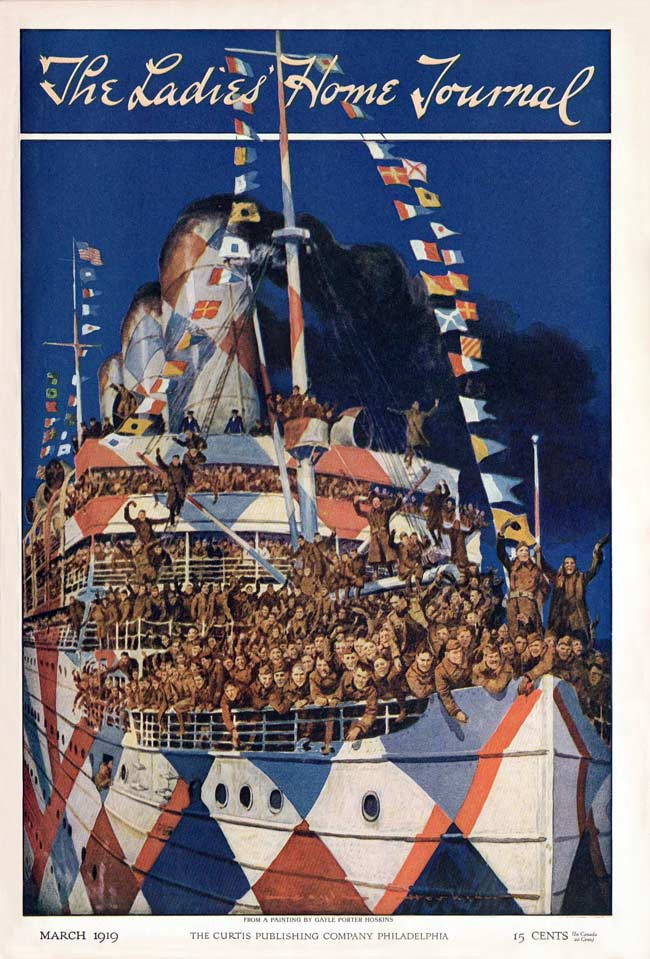
Ladies Home Journal Magazine Cover March 1919

== See also ==
- Howard Pyle
- Frank Schoonover
- National Museum of American Illustration
- Delaware Art Museum
