= Walter Everett =

Walter Everett may refer to:

- Walter Goodnow Everett (1860–1937), professor of Latin, philosophy, and natural theology
- Walter Everett (musicologist), musicologist specializing in popular music
- Walter Hunt Everett, American artist
- Walter Everett (journalist), journalist, awarded special citation for Maria Moors Cabot prize in 1975
