= James E. Allen =

James E. Allen may refer to:

- James E. Allen Jr. (1911–1971), Commissioner of Education of the State of New York
- James E. Allen (artist) (1894–1964), American illustrator, printmaker, and painter
- Paulie Gilmore (James E. Allen), American professional wrestler and promoter
