= Philip R. Goodwin =

American painter

- Born: Philip Russell Goodwin; September 16, 1881; Norwich, Connecticut, United States
- Died: December 14, 1935 (aged 54); Mamaroneck, New York, United States
- Education: Rhode Island School of Design, the Art Students League in New York City, and the Drexel Institute of Art, Science and Industry, Howard Pyle at the Howard Pyle School of Illustration Art
- Known for: Painting, Illustration
- Notable work: The Call of the Wild, "African Game Trails", the Horse & Rider Trademark of the Winchester Repeating Arms Company, American Museum of Natural History, the Brandywine River Museum, the Buffalo Bill Historical Center, the Charles M. Russell Museum, the Glenbow Museum, the Cowboy Hall of Fame, the National Museum of Wildlife Art, the Gilcrease Museum and many other collections
- Movement: Impressionism, Wildlife, Brandywine School

Philip Russell Goodwin (September 16, 1881 – December 14, 1935) was an American painter and illustrator who specialized in depictions of wildlife, the outdoors, fishing, hunting and the Old American West. He provided illustrations for numerous books and magazines, as well as for commercial items, such as posters, advertisements and calendars. He is perhaps best known for illustrating Jack London's The Call of the Wild and for providing the cover art for many issues of Outdoor Recreation / Outdoor Life Magazine during the 1920s and early 1930s. He is also the artist who designed the Horse & Rider Trademark of the Winchester Repeating Arms Company. Goodwin was a very private person and did not seek publicity, so not much was known about his private life during his lifetime. Most of what is known comes from letters held at the Buffalo Bill Historical Center.

== Early life ==
Goodwin was born in Norwich, Connecticut, in 1881. At age 11, he sold his first illustrated story to Collier's Magazine. Goodwin studied art at the Rhode Island School of Design, the Art Students League in New York City, and the Drexel Institute of Art, Science and Industry (now Drexel University) in Philadelphia under the well known Howard Pyle. He later followed Pyle when he opened his own Howard Pyle School of Illustration Art. N.C. Wyeth, Thornton Oakley and Frank Schoonover were contemporaries of Goodwin who also studied under Pyle at that time.

== Early career ==
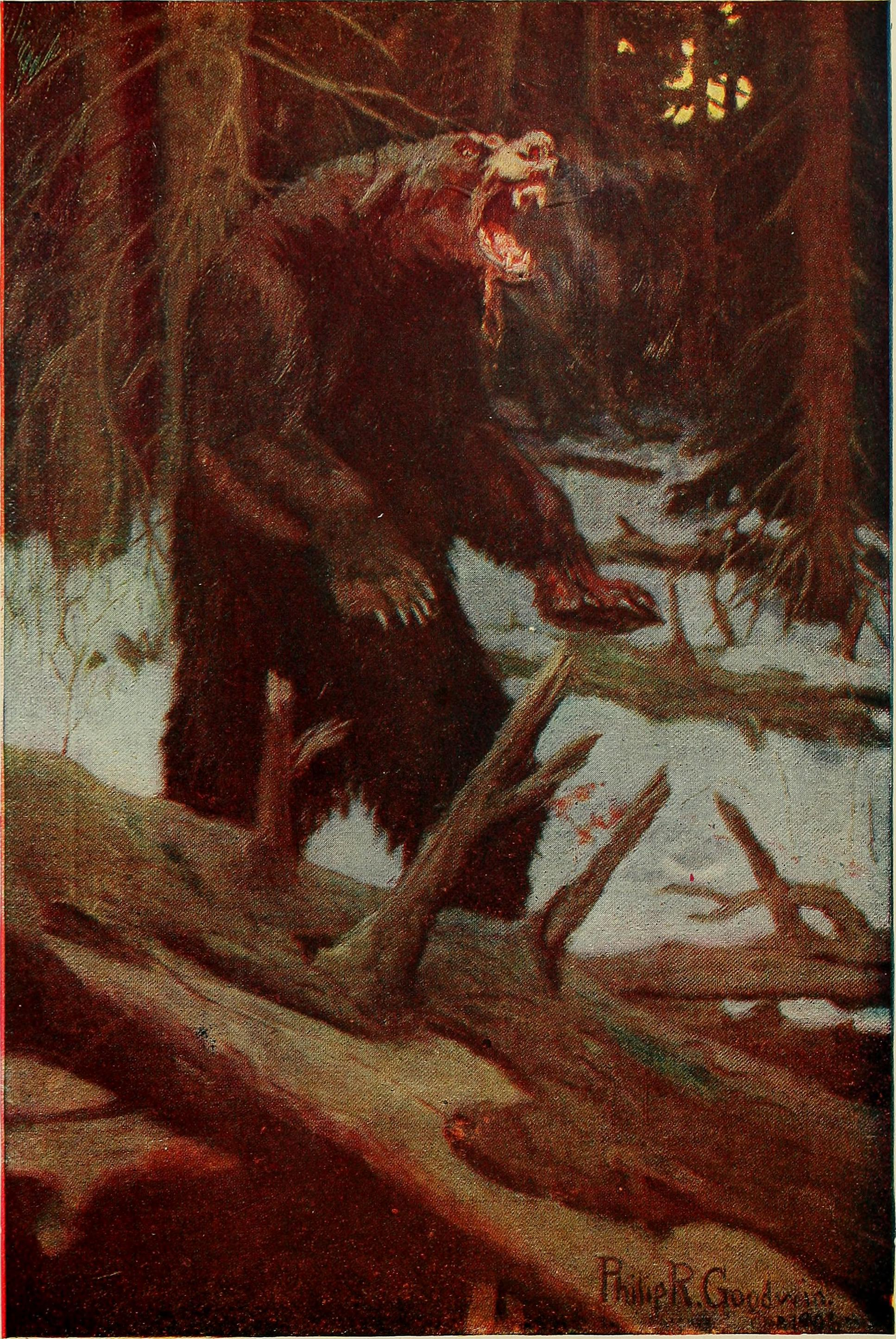
Artwork by Goodwin, published in Outing

Goodwin illustrated Jack London's The Call of the Wild in 1903 at the age of 22. He later illustrated Theodore Roosevelt's African Game Trails. Goodwin opened a studio in 1904 in New York City, and became well known for his illustrations in numerous magazines and commercial items, such as posters, calendars, and catalogs. Some of the magazines in which his work appeared include: Collier's Weekly, Outdoor Life, Outers' Recreation, Scribner's Magazine, The Popular Magazine, and McClure's Magazine. He also did several covers for The Saturday Evening Post.

== Mid-career ==
Goodwin became good friends with Charles Russell, staying with him at Russell's Lazy KY Ranch and his Bull Head Lodge, and also traveling with him on painting, hunting and fishing expeditions. On these expeditions, Russell and Goodwin influenced each other's painting techniques. Goodwin was also friends with Carl Rungius, an avid outdoorsman who taught Goodwin the finer points of hunting and surviving in the wilderness. Goodwin also met and became friends with Theodore Roosevelt, Will Rogers, and Ernest Seton Thompson. Goodwin's calendars were published by Brown and Bigelow, the nation’s largest calendar publisher and he received substantial commissions for illustrating advertisements for the Horton Manufacturing Company (Maker of Steel fishing rods), Winchester Repeating Arms Company and Marlin Firearms Company

== Late career ==
Goodwin ran into bad luck during the Great Depression when his savings bank failed. His work was primarily commission-based and his primary activities during that time were gun ads and calendar art, which were barely sufficient to maintain his studio.

== Style ==
Goodwin's style is epitomized by The Surprise, currently in the collection of the National Museum of Wildlife Art. The museum describes the painting:

a photographer is coming upon a mother bear and her two cubs. The painting exemplifies Goodwin's open color palette, use of distance and atmosphere, and sense of humor. He painted many wildlife, hunting, fishing, and western scenes, often composed from behind the subject's shoulder.

== Collections ==
Goodwin is well represented in many private collections and museums featuring western and outdoor themes, including the American Museum of Natural History; the Brandywine River Museum; the Buffalo Bill Historical Center; the Charles M. Russell Museum; the Glenbow Museum; the Cowboy Hall of Fame; the National Museum of Wildlife Art; and the Gilcrease Museum.

== Books ==
The primary biography on Goodwin's life and art is Philip R. Goodwin: America's Sporting & Wildlife Artist.

== See also ==
- Brandywine School
- Howard Pyle
- Carl Rungius
- Charles Russell
