= Blanche Grant =

American painter

Blanche Chloe Grant
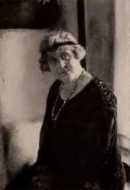
- Born: September 23, 1874; Leavenworth, Kansas
- Died: June 19, 1948 (aged 73); Taos, New Mexico
- Known for: Artist, author, historian

Blanche Chloe Grant, Indian Tales, Taos, oil on canvas, 1922

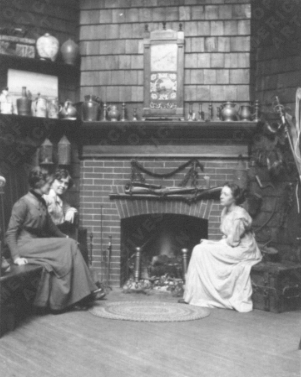
Blanche Grant (left), Olive Rush and Ethel Penewill Brown at Howard Pyle's Studio in Wilmington Delaware (1911)

Blanche Chloe Grant (1874–1948), was a member of the Taos Art Colony, she was a painter of landscape and figure work associated with the Taos Pueblo Indians and the American Southwest. She was also a printmaker and wrote several books on the history of Taos, New Mexico.

== Education ==
Grant was born in Leavenworth, Kansas. She attended high school in Indianapolis, Indiana and graduated in the first class from Vassar College with an A.B. degree, majoring in History and English. She studied art at the School of the Boston Museum of Fine Arts with William McGregor Paxton and Philip Leslie Hale, as well as the Pennsylvania Academy of Fine Arts with William Merritt Chase, and Henry Bainbridge McCarter, and at The Art Students League in New York.

== Professional career ==
Before her career as an artist, Grant was a teacher and associate principal at high schools in East Bridgewater and Taunton, MA.

Grant later became a part of Howard Pyle's circle of illustrators in Wilmington, Delaware. At Pyle's premature passing in Italy in 1911, Grant, Olive Rush and Ethel Pennewill Leach were sharing his studio (see photo). By 1914, she was an established magazine illustrator and landscape painter with a studio in New York.

In 1920 she moved to Taos, New Mexico where she created her most notable works: paintings of the Taos Pueblo Indians as well as writing several books on them, the history of Taos, and other parts of the Southwest including writing on Kit Carson.

In 1922 when Grant was editor of the Taos newspaper, Bert G. Phillips presented to her the idea that she might write the story of the various artists that followed him and what brought each of them to Taos. This suggestion along with her work at the newspaper seems to have been the start of her long commitment to the community affairs of Taos and promoting tourism and the art colonies there.

In 1925, she published three Taos related books titled: "One hundred Years Ago in Old Taos", "Taos Today", and "Taos Indians". In her book "One Hundred Years Ago in Old Taos", Grant includes illustrations of five paintings by Taos Society artists including Joseph Henry Sharp, Eanger Irving Couse and Bert Geer Phillips. Here she promotes an upcoming book to be titled "Taos and its Artists" This title was never published, probably because the Taos Society of Artists was disbanded in 1927.

Her 1925 title "Taos Today" ends with a guide to Taos and sections on "How to get to Taos", "What there is to see", "Where to go" and "What to do", and includes a calendar with dates of various fiestas, dances and other celebrations of the Puebloan people. In addition, the book lists local artists studios where tourists can visit by appointment. The list includes:

Active Studios at Taos (1925)
| * Victor Higgins — Desert Edge | * Catharine Carter Critcher — Pueblo Road |
| * Ernest L. Blumenschein — Simpson Street | * E. Martin Hennings — Pueblo Road |
| * Walter Ufer — Beaubien Lane | * Bert Geer Phillips — Pueblo Road |
| Leon Gaspard — La Lomita | * W. Herbert Dunton — La Loma |
| * Joseph Henry Sharp — Carson Road | * Oscar E. Berninghaus — La Loma |
| * Eanger Irving Couse — Carson Road | Blanche Chloe Grant — La Loma |
Ralph Meyers – Mission Shop

* Member of the Taos Society of Artists

In her 1934 title "When Old Trails Were New" she includes a chapter called "The Taos Art Colony" in which she finally tells the stories of the Taos Society of Artists as well as stories of other important artists from Taos at the time.

== Collections and exhibitions ==
Blanche Grant showed in exhibitions on both the east and west coasts, including, the Second Annual Exhibition of the Omaha Society of Fine Arts and the First Traveling Exhibition of Western Painters.

Her paintings can be found in private collections and at the Harwood Museum of Art in Taos, the New Mexico Museum of Art in Santa Fe, and the Museum of the Southwest, Los Angeles, CA.

== Death ==
On June 16, 1948, Grant died in Taos at 73 years old. Her funeral was attended by the Mayor of Taos, as well as friends from the art community. Oscar Berninghaus, Victor Higgins and E. Martin Hennings were among the pallbearers. She is buried at Sierra Vista Cemetery in Taos.

== Legacy ==
Papers relating to an unpublished book called "The Forty Seventh Star – New Mexico" are held in the archives of the Houghton Library of the Harvard University Library.

Grant also produced murals for the New Mexico Technical University library ("Mine") in Socorro, New Mexico, and for the Taos Presbyterian Church, the latter in 1921. These are no longer extant.

== Selected bibliography ==
- Blanche Grant (1925) Taos Indians
- Blanche Grant (1925) Taos Today
- Blanche Grant (1925) One Hundred Years Ago in Old Taos
- Kit Carson; Blanche Grant (1926) Kit Carson's own story of his life
- Blanche Grant (1934) When Old Trails Were New: The Story of Taos
- Blanche Grant (1941) Doña Lona: a Story of Old Taos and Santa Fé
