= Harry Beckhoff =

American illustrator

- Born: 1901
- Died: 1979 (aged 77–78)

Harry Beckhoff (1901–1979) was an American illustrator.

== Work ==
Country Gentlemen published his first magazine illustrations in 1929. From the late 1920s to the early 1960s Beckhoff did illustrations for numerous books and magazines, most notably Collier's. His small sketches, almost thumb-nail size contained all of the information needed including facial expressions. He then pantographed the drawing, up-scaling it up to five time, and inked in the outlines.

== Style and influence ==
Although he studied with Dean Cornwell and Harvey Dunn, he didn't pursue the style of painterly brushstrokes and impastos. Instead, he defined his forms with flat shapes, whose internal forms are defined by thin lines. The emphasis is more on silhouette and line than it is on texture and lighting. Beckhoff also described his work as having been influenced by illustrators Martin, Brissaud, and Marty.
