= Howard Pyle Studios =

- Pyle, Howard, Studios
- U.S. National Register of Historic Places
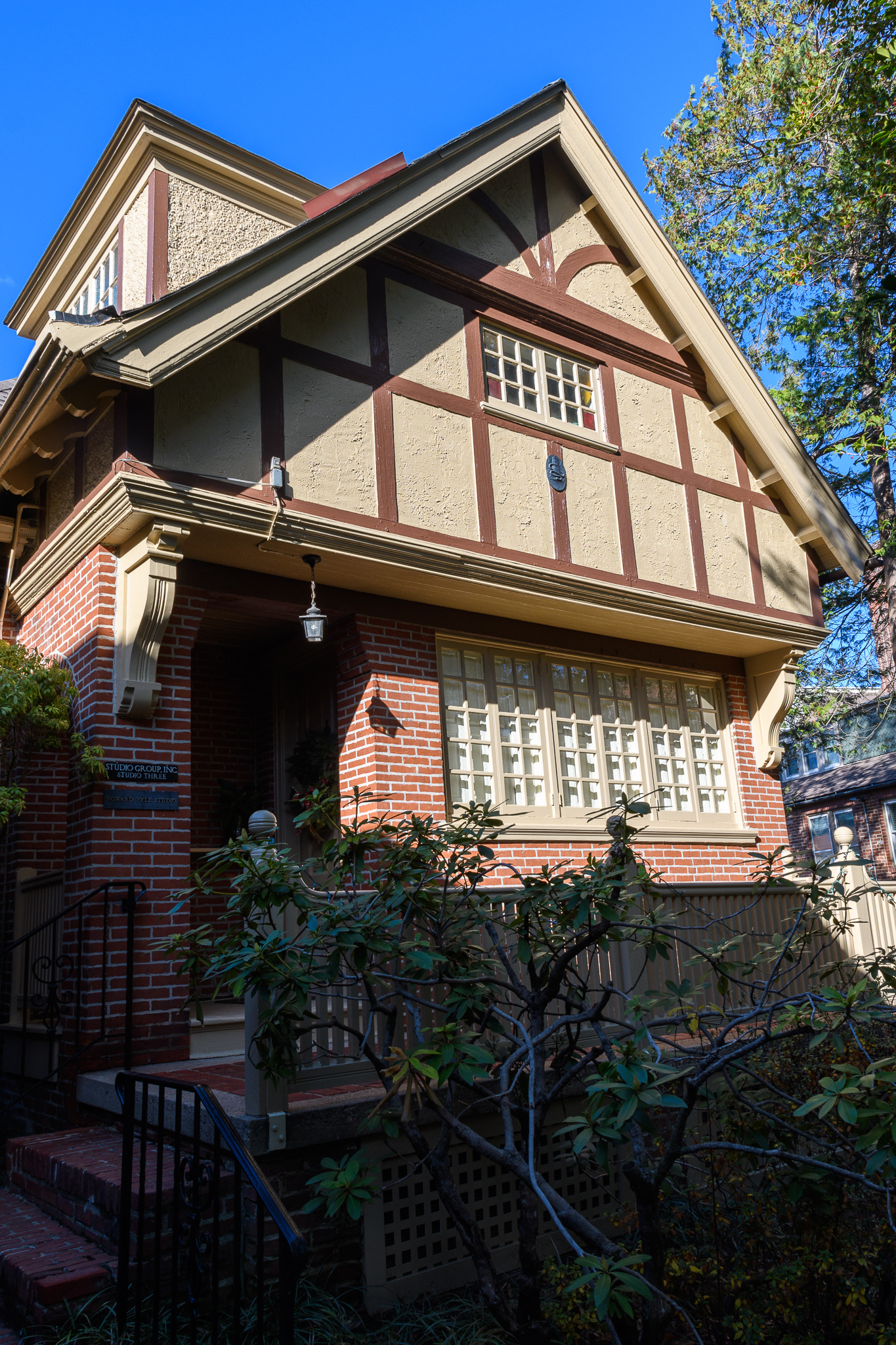
- Howard Pyle's Studio (1883)

- Location within Delaware Location within the United States
- Location: 1305 and 1307 N. Franklin St., Wilmington, Delaware
- Coordinates: 39.754657°N 75.557928°W
- Area: 0.2 acres (0.081 ha)
- Built: 1883
- Architectural style: Tudor Revival
- NRHP reference No.: 78000911
- Added to NRHP: March 8, 1978

The Howard Pyle Studios are two historic buildings used for painting and teaching by illustrator Howard Pyle. The studios are located in a densely populated neighborhood near Brandywine Park and the Delaware Avenue Historic District. The building used by Pyle as his own studio was built in 1883, mainly in brick with a Tudor Revival half timbered gable. The smaller studio, that Pyle used for teaching, was built in a similar style in 1900. After Pyle's death in 1911, the buildings were owned by Stanley Arthurs, until 1950, and then by Ellen duPont Wheelwright until 1964. The Studio Group acquired the studios in 1964 and continues to use them as art studios. In 1978, the property was listed on the National Register of Historic Places.

== History ==
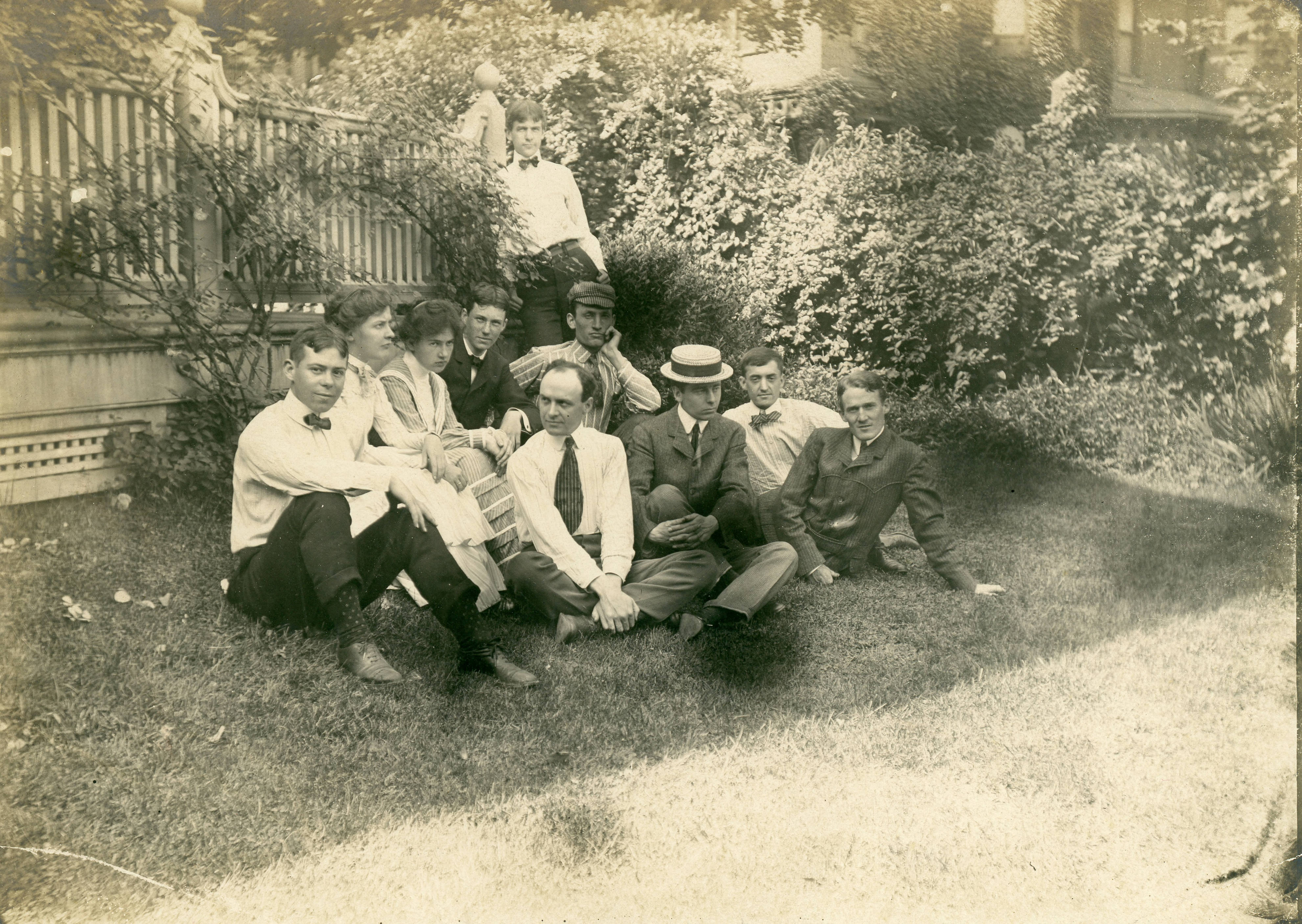
Pyle's students on the lawn, 1901

Pyle's interest in English history was reflected in the 1883 studio, which was built in a style variously described as Tudor Revival, Queen Anne style, or "Shavian Manorial", because of its similarity to works by English architect Richard Norman Shaw. The original studio was set back eighty feet from the street and has a steeply pitched roof. One gable forms the main facade of the studio framing the entry porch and a triple casement window.

The brick studio school was built in 1900 in a similar style. It fronts on the street and occupies the south side of the property. Pyle's students attended at no charge. A total of 75 students attended between 1900 and 1911, including N.C. Wyeth, Frank Schoonover, Harvey Dunn, Stanley Arthurs, and George Harding.

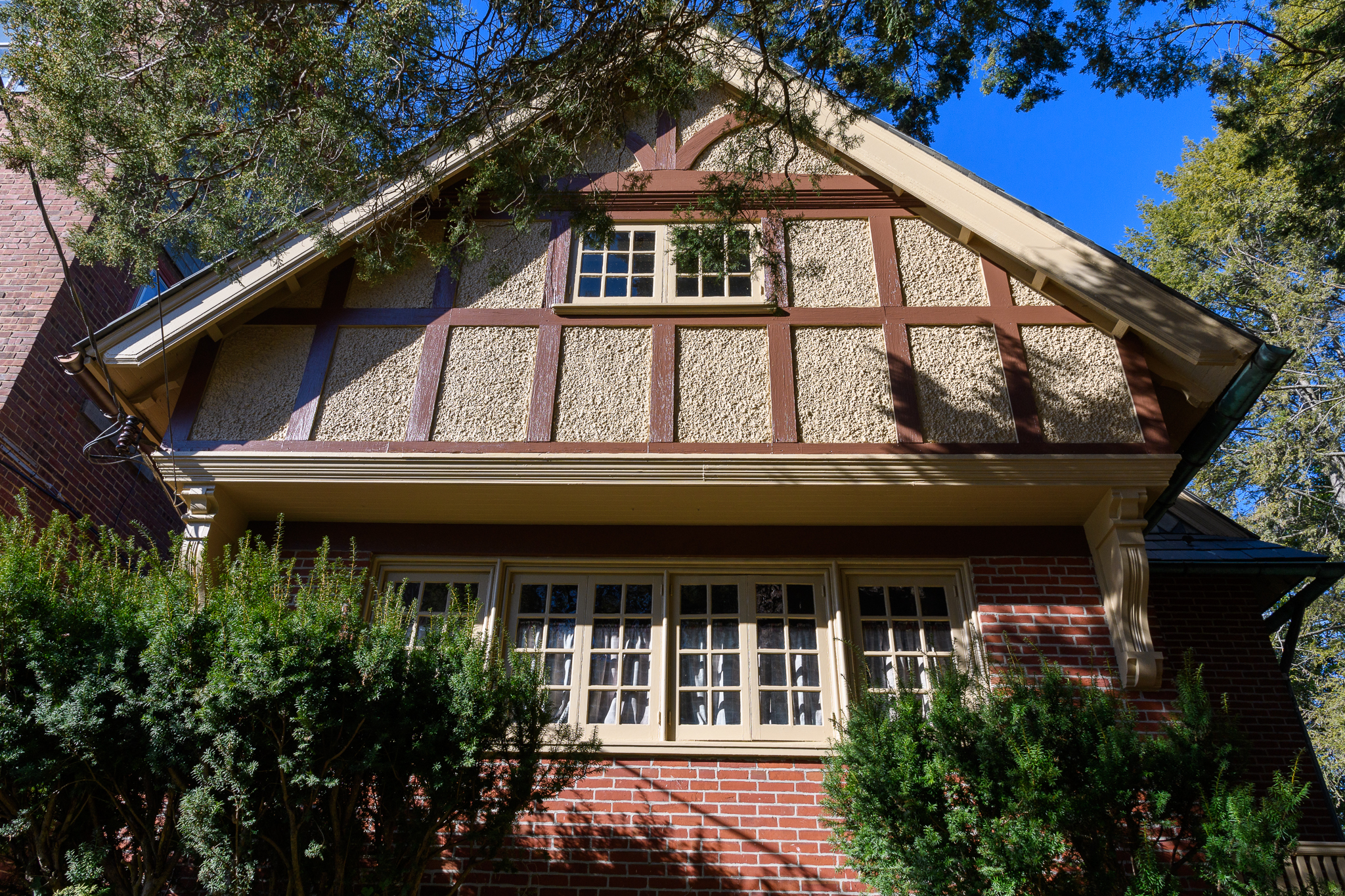
Pyle School, Built in 1900

== See also ==
- Delaware Art Museum
- Frank E. Schoonover Studios
