= Ellen Bernard Thompson Pyle =

American illustrator

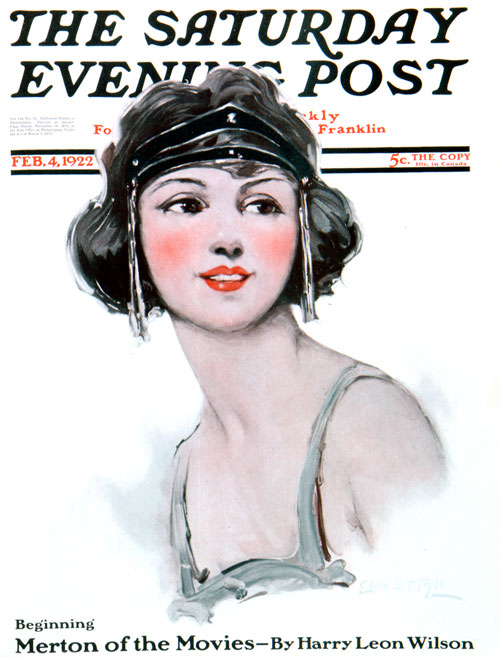
Cover of the Saturday Evening Post, February 4, 1922, entitled Flapper by Ellen B.T. Pyle.

Ellen Bernard Thompson Pyle (November 11, 1876 – August 1, 1936) was an American illustrator best known for the 40 covers she created for The Saturday Evening Post in the 1920s and 1930s under the guidance of Post editor-in-chief, George Horace Lorimer. She studied with Howard Pyle and later married Pyle's brother Walter.

== Life ==
Born in the Germantown section of Philadelphia on November 11, 1876, to Newcomb Butler and Kate Ashton Thompson, Ellen began her artistic studies at the Drexel Institute of Art, Science and Industry in 1895. In 1897, she began to study under the famous illustrator Howard Pyle, and in 1898 and 1899, she was one of his top students. She was given commissions for illustrations for periodicals and books, and she was invited to attend Howard Pyle's Brandywine School in Chadds Ford, Pennsylvania both years. Around this time, she met Howard's youngest brother, Walter. In 1900 or 1901, Ellen's study with Howard Pyle ended, but she continued to work from her parents' home, and she had a number of book and magazine illustrations published. In 1904, she and Walter married, and she moved to Wilmington, Delaware.

Walter and Ellen had four children between 1906 and 1914 and she suspended her art career to raise her family. in 1928 she wrote, “The absorbing task of raising four children put artwork in the background for a time. There has been a great deal of discussion as to whether a woman can keep on with her work and be a competent mother.”

In 1919, Walter died of Bright's Disease, and Ellen, then aged 42, returned to illustration art to support her family. She created magazine covers and book dust jacket art throughout the 1920s and 1930s, gaining in popularity each year. Two of her children attended art school and became successful artists. “I criticized their work, and they often pose for me, and at times it seems as if everyone in the house was either painting or being painted.” Pyle died on August 1, 1936, of heart disease, a few months short of her 60th birthday.

Ellen Pyle's youngest daughter, Caroline, married Nathaniel C. Wyeth, elder son of N. C. Wyeth. Musician Howard Wyeth was one of her many grandchildren.

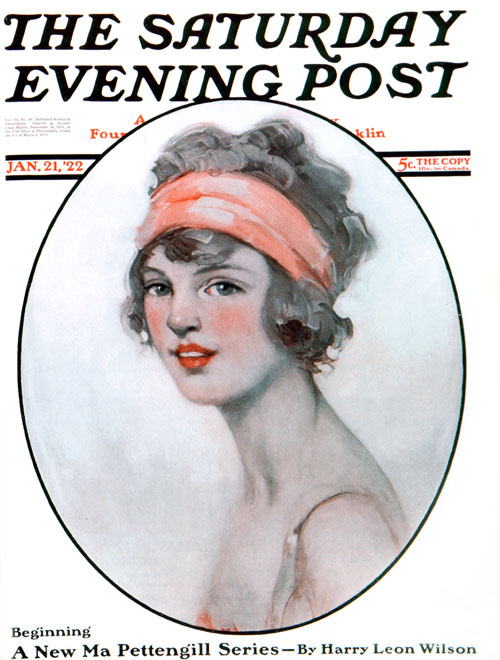
Cover of the Saturday Evening Post, January 21, 1922, entitled Woman with Headband by Ellen B.T. Pyle.

== Art ==
Pyle's covers for the Saturday Evening Post in the 1920s and 1930s often featured flappers, athletic young women, and rosy-cheeked children, sometimes with their grandmothers. Her own children modelled for 20 of these covers. Friends and neighbors also commonly served as models. She wrote “The girl I am most interested in painting is the unaffected natural American type, the girl that likes to coast and skate in winter, who often goes without her hat, and who gets a thrill out of tramping over country roads in the fall.”

Some of her most memorable covers were:

- Flapper - February 4, 1922.
- Girl Hockey Player - January 22, 1927.
- Sea in the Shell - August 6, 1927 - a toddler listens to a seashell.
- Target Practice - October 8, 1927 - a young woman practices archery.
- Radio Days - February 22, 1930 - a grandmother and child listen to an early radio.
- Waiting for the Bus - December 13, 1930 - a grandmother and grandson wait for a bus.
- Woman Tennis Player - August 30, 1932.
- Flower Children - May 5, 1934 - two children sell flowers in the rain for “5 cents a Bunsh”.

An original Saturday Evening Post cover by Ellen Pyle was appraised at $25,000-35,000 in 2006 on the Antiques Roadshow

Her first career retrospective, organized by one of her great-grandchildren, was displayed at the Delaware Art Museum in 2009.

== Sources ==
- Smith, KE and JK Schiller. 2009. Illustrating Her World: Ellen B. T. Pyle. Delaware Art Museum: Wilmington, DE
