= Delaware Avenue Historic District (Wilmington, Delaware) =

Historic district in Delaware, United States

- U.S. National Register of Historic Places
- U.S. Historic district
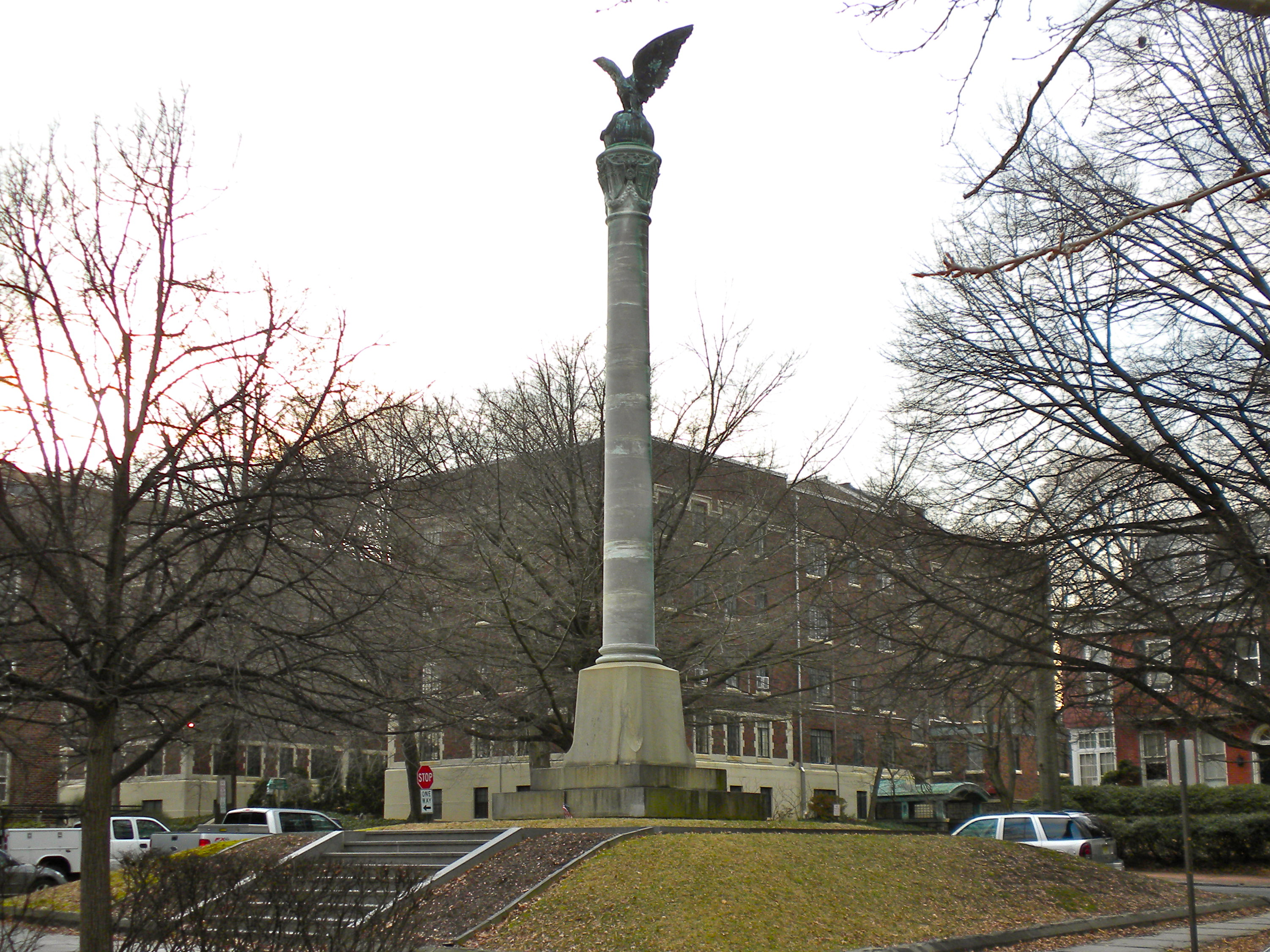
- Sailors and Soldiers Monument, January 2010

- Location within Delaware Location within the United States
- Location: Delaware Ave. from N. Harrison to N. Broom Sts. (both sides), roughly bounded by Shallcross Ave., Harrison St., Pennsylvania Ave., and Rodney St., Wilmington, Delaware
- Coordinates: 39°45′18″N 75°33′34″W
- Area: 14.4 acres (5.8 ha)
- Built: 1870-1930
- Architect: Multiple
- Architectural style: Colonial Revival, Queen Anne, Italianate, Late Victorian, Classical Revival, American Four Square
- NRHP reference No.: 76000576 (original); 87000034 (increase)

Significant dates
- Added to NRHP: September 13, 1976
- Boundary increase: May 12, 1987

Delaware Avenue Historic District is a national historic district located at Wilmington, New Castle County, Delaware. It encompasses 180 contributing buildings and 1 contributing structure developed in the late-19th and early-20th centuries. The district is primarily residential and includes a variety of Victorian-era mansions and large dwellings in a variety of popular architectural styles including Italianate, Queen Anne, Colonial Revival, Classical Revival, and American Four Square The houses are detached or semi-detached and are primarily three stories in height with extensive wings to the rear. The district also includes 20th century apartment complexes. Also located in the district is the St. Stephen's Lutheran Church and the Sailors and Soldiers Monument. The separately listed Howard Pyle Studios are also located in the district.

It was added to the National Register of Historic Places in 1976, with a boundary increase in 1987.

== Education ==
Residents are zoned to the Red Clay Consolidated School District, both in the original section and the expansion. Zoned schools include William C. Lewis Dual Language Elementary School (K-5), Skyline Middle School (6-8), and Alexis I. du Pont High School.
