= James E. Allen (artist) =

American printmaker and illustrator (1894–1964)

- Born: James Edmund Allen; February 23, 1894; Louisiana, Missouri, United States
- Died: September 9, 1964 (aged 70); Larchmont, New York, United States
- Education: School of the Art Institute of Chicago; Art Students League of New York; Grand Central School of Art
- Known for: Printmaker; Illustrator; Painter
- Movement: Social realism American realism

James Edmund Allen (February 23, 1894 – September 9, 1964) was an American illustrator, printmaker, and painter. His works include a significant body of lithographs and etchings showing steelworkers, pipe workers, and other aspects of American industrial life, carefully composed compositions depicting "the daily heroism of America's industrial workers." Allen was also a prolific illustrator who, working mostly in oil, contributed numerous illustrations to stories in popular magazines of the day. He has been misidentified in many references as James Edward Allen.

== Early life ==
When Allen was three his family moved to a rural area outside Anaconda, Montana. Known as "Edd" to his family and friends, he and his younger brother, Elmer "Lee" Allen (1896–1971), loved the rugged outdoor life in Montana and the values of persistence and self-reliance it instilled. They learned horse training from the Blackfoot Indians, earning the nickname "Horse Whisperers". It was also during this time that James began developing his skills as an artist, concentrating on outdoor scenes portraying men at work. This style, portraying the muscle of America, became the hallmark of his future success as an artist.

In 1913 he moved to Chicago to study painting at the Art Institute of Chicago. There he became a friend of future illustrator J. Allen St. John. By 1915 he was studio assistant to his art teacher, Alexis Jean Fournier. Soon after, he moved to New York where he took classes at the Art Students' League, the Grand Central School of Art, and the Hans Hoffman School.

== Career ==
James Allen began his over 30-year career as illustrator with the People's Popular Monthly in 1913. In 1916 James E. Allen moved to Interlaken, New Jersey, living among other artists in the well-known Interlaken Colony near Asbury Park, New York. He was soon selling freelance illustrations to magazines and book publishers in nearby Philadelphia and New York City. By the end of his career, his work appeared in some 20 popular magazines such as American Boy, Blue Book (magazine), Collier's, Cosmopolitan, Good Housekeeping, Ladies' Home Journal, Nash's and Pall Mall Magazine, The Red Cross Magazine, and Saturday Evening Post. As a staff artist for Doubleday, Page and Company, he illustrated a 17-volume edition of the works of Guy de Maupassant, and later works by Gopal Mukerji and Emma-Lindsay Squier. He also illustrated the popular Sinclair Dinosaur Book for the Sinclair Refining Company.

In 1917 James and Elmer joined the United States Armed Forces and served with the American Expeditionary Forces in Germany where James became a 2nd Lieutenant and flier. In 1919 he resumed his career as a freelance illustrator.

James married Grace Louise Parmele in Chicago on January 8, 1919. The newlyweds moved to Frasmere Avenue in Spring Lake, New Jersey, also near Asbury Park. From this location the artist commuted to New York City and Philadelphia to sell freelance illustrations to publishers in both cities. By 1924 his greater market was in NYC, so he rented an art studio at 939 Eighth Avenue, on West 56th Street. His studio was one block from the Art Students League, where he attended classes taught by Joseph Pennell.

In May 1925 Allen traveled to Paris and rented a studio from artist John Storrs, which he shared with Howard Cook. There he experimented with various artistic media, making lithographs and etchings for the first time. Allen systematically absorbed the teachings of his "graphic heroes" Kasimir Malevich and Paul Cezanne. He admired the work of the Cubists and George Rouault, but he continued to search for economy of line and careful orchestration of tone in his own work. His first etching, Dragon Court, from 1925, is a depiction of the Parisian Cour du Dragon courtyard.

Allen and Grace returned to New York City in November 1925 aboard the SS America, not, as asserted by some sources, due to the economic realities of the Great Depression some years later. He resumed work in commercial illustration and continued to hone his skills as a printmaker under Joseph Pennell and William Auerbach-Levy. During this period he also studied with Arshile Gorky and Harvey Dunn at the Grand Central School of Art as well as with sculptor Naum M. Los to improve his sense of 3-dimensional form.

While some sources claim a relationship with the Work Projects Administration (WPA), this appears not to be true. David W. Keihl writes "James E. Allen valued the worth of hard work and personal ingenuity for survival. He did not participate in the WPA programmes".

In 1932, Allen first entered his prints in juried exhibitions and his work began to receive widespread academic and critical acclaim. That year his "The Builders" received both a Shaw Prize from New York's Salmagundi Club and a Henry B. Shope Award from the Society of American Etchers, now known as the Society of American Graphic Artists (SAGA). A year later, "Brazilian Builders" took a Charles M. Lea Award at the Philadelphia Print Club Exhibition. Allen also began exhibiting his work in galleries during the 1930s, including at Kennedy and Company and the Grand Central Art Gallery. He later exhibited, became a member and acted as a juror for exhibitions at the Society of American Etchers.

In 1934 Allen illustrated the "Sinclair Dinosaur Book" as a keepsake for visitors to the Sinclair Oil Dinosaur exhibit at The Chicago World's Fair. It contained 7 full-colored illustrations from his paintings. It was followed by the "Sinclair Dinosaur Stamp Album" in 1935. Some 4 million albums were handed out at Sinclair Gas Stations as a promotional item. He took for inspiration the dinosaurs displayed at the "A Century of Progress" World's Fair, which had opened the previous year in Chicago, and the work of Charles R. Knight. Typical of his dedication, he undertook his own scientific studies under Br. Barnum Brown at the American Museum of Natural History to assure the accuracy of his subjects. In 1938 Allen produced a series of eight lithographs of dinosaurs for Sinclair Refining Company advertisements.

But it is for his images of industrial workers from the 1930s that Allen is best known. In scenes of steelworkers such as "The Builders", "The Connectors", "Skyriders" and "Up Above the World", he creates "a vivid and suggestive picture of the powerful rhythm of daily labour and of the fearless readiness of the workers to perform their allotted tasks". In 1937 he received a commission to create twelve lithographs for the United States Pipe and Foundry Company, showing laborers installing giant pipelines in varied settings.

In 1938 the Graphic Arts Division of the Smithsonian's Museum of American History presented a solo exhibition of his work, further elevating his stature as a master printmaker. As one reviewer remarked: "avoiding the present-day epidemic of social protest ... these are graphic depictions of men at work, healthy, satisfied to build for tomorrow, proud in their strength and manual skill". Allen turned from themes of industry to "more exciting" themes of war in the early 1940s, showing scenes of bombers, convoys, dirigibles, etc. but never strayed from his focus on the role people played. Scenes like "Parachutists", "Reserves", "Everybody's War", and "Stowing the Jumbo" focus on personal struggle and labor that was characteristic of his prints before his war experience.

== Later years ==
In 1943 Allen abandoned printmaking in order to study abstract painting with Hans Hofmann. In two series of paintings he experimented in a new dreamlike style depicting "arabesques of figures flatly painted on a flat background with stylized suggestions of mountains." In 1944 and 1945, Kindred, MacLean & Co. commissioned two new lithographs, "Caribou" and "Elk", as Christmas promotionals. In 1946 he became an art teacher of printmaking at the National Academy of Design in New York City. He retired from illustration in the 1950s but continued to exhibit his prints and paintings at fine art galleries. He later developed a degenerative brain disease, diagnosed as Huntington's chorea, and one of the consequences of his illness was that he destroyed many of the preparatory sketches for the prints.

James E. Allen died in Larchmont, New York, at the age of seventy on September 9, 1964.

== Works ==
James E. Allen produced numerous prints (lithographs and engravings), many commissioned as advertising art. A comprehensive exhibit in 1984 at the Mary Ryan Gallery in New York showed 91 of his prints. The catalog, and the corresponding "Ryan" numbering, has served as a catalog raisonné for his prints. A more comprehensive catalog of his works, including Allen's illustration art, is now available as part of an online exhibit about the artist at Stanford University. Significant collections of his prints can be found at the Smithsonian American Art Museum and the Metropolitan Museum of Art.

Allen was a prolific painter who prepared most of his illustrations in oil. A few paintings have shown up at auction and are known to be in private collections, but the fate of most his canvases are unknown. An example can be found at the Kelly Collection of American Illustration Art.

== Sources ==
- Bénézit, Emmanuel. The Benezit Dictionary of Artists. [Oxford] : Oxford University Press, 2011. <http://www.oxfordartonline.com/benezit>
- Castagno, John. Artists As Illustrators: An International Directory with Signatures and Monograms, 1800 – the Present. Metuchen, N.J. : Scarecrow Press, 1989.
- Falk, Peter H. Dictionary of Signatures & Monograms of American Artists: From the Colonial Period to the Mid 20th Century. Madison, Conn: Sound View Press, 1988.
- Falk, Peter H, Audrey M. Lewis, Georgia Kuchen, and Veronika Roessler. Who Was Who in American Art, 1564–1975: 400 Years of Artists in America. Madison, CT: Sound View Press, 1999.
- Fielding, Mantle, Glenn B. Opitz. Mantle Fielding's Dictionary of American Painters, Sculptors & Engravers. Poughkeepsie, NY: Apollo, 1986.
- Mallett, Daniel Trowbridge, b. 1862. Mallett's Index of Artists, International-biographical: Including Painters, Sculptors, Illustrators, Engravers And Etchers of the Past And the Present. New York: R. R. Bowker company, 1935.
- Saunders, David. "J. E. Allen." Field Guide To Wild American Pulp Artists, 2013, <https://www.pulpartists.com/Allen.html>
- Smith, Donald E. American Printmakers of the Twentieth Century: A Bibliography. Haworth, NJ: St. Johann Press, 2004.
- Williams, Lynn B. American Printmakers, 1880–1945: An Index to Reproductions and Biocritical Information. Metuchen, N.J: Scarecrow Press, 1993.
