= Frank E. Schoonover Studios =

- Schoonover, Frank E., Studios
- U.S. National Register of Historic Places
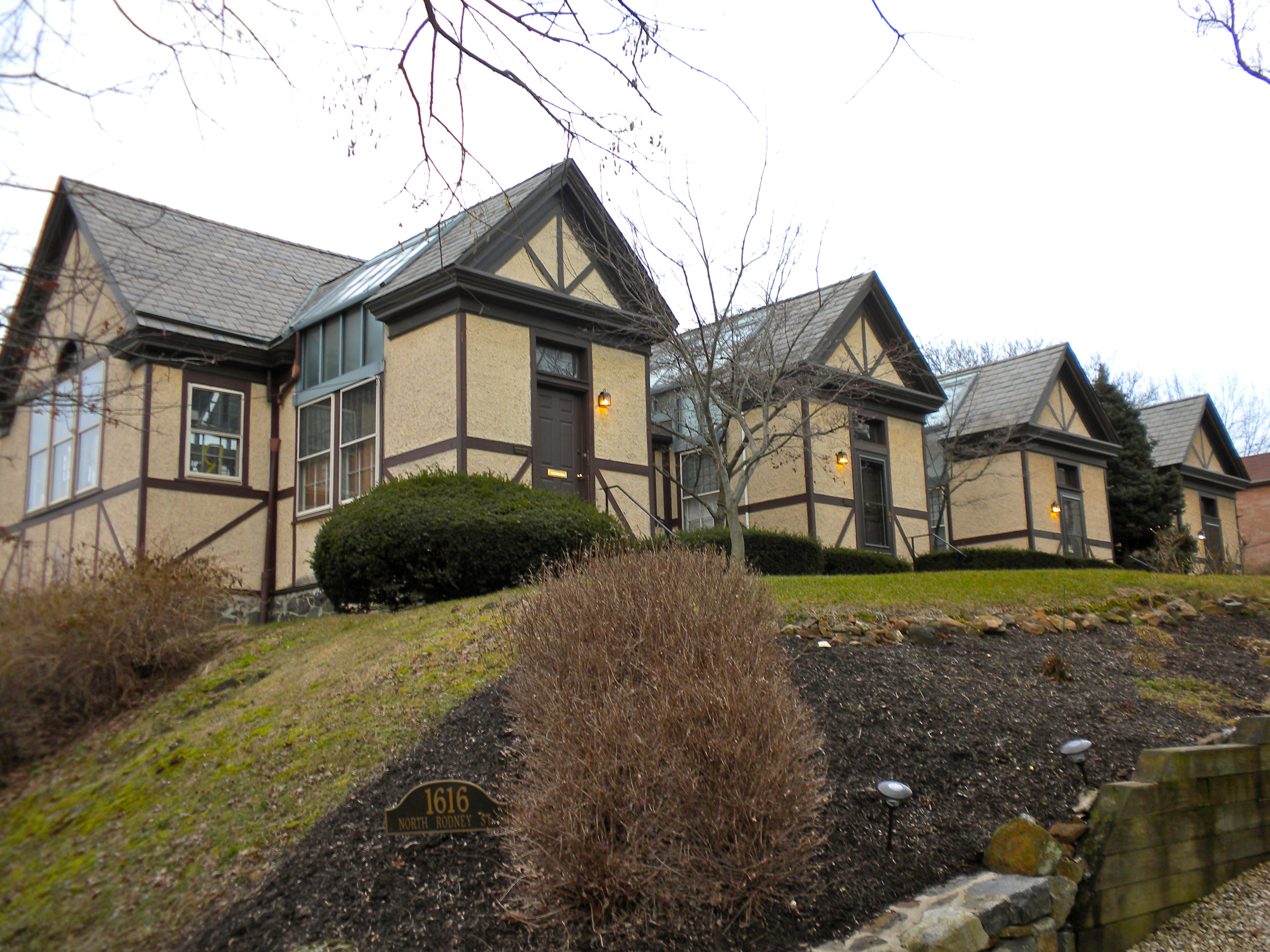

- Location within Delaware Location within the United States
- Location: 1616 Rodney St., Wilmington, Delaware
- Coordinates: 39°45′26″N 75°33′30″W
- Area: 0.5 acres (0.20 ha)
- Built: 1905
- Architect: Rice, Capt. E.L., Jr.
- Architectural style: Queen Anne
- NRHP reference No.: 79000636
- Added to NRHP: April 20, 1979

The Frank E. Schoonover Studios in Wilmington, Delaware comprise a historic building that was used by the students of illustrator Howard Pyle, including the original tenants Frank Schoonover, N.C. Wyeth, Harvey Dunn, and Clifford Ashley. Philanthropist and art collector Samuel Bancroft paid for the building which was designed by the prominent local architect Capt. E.L. Rice, Jr. and built in 1905 in a simplified Queen Anne or Shavian Manorial style. It was added to the National Register of Historic Places in 1979.

Schoonover remained in his studio, Number 1, until the end of his career, but the other original tenants moved out within ten years. Other artists moved in but Schoonover eventually became the sole owner of the property. After his death in 1972, a group of artists restored the building.

In 2006, the Delaware History Museum held a special exhibition about the Studios.

== See also ==
- Delaware Art Museum
- Howard Pyle Studios
