= Walter Hunt Everett =

American illustrator

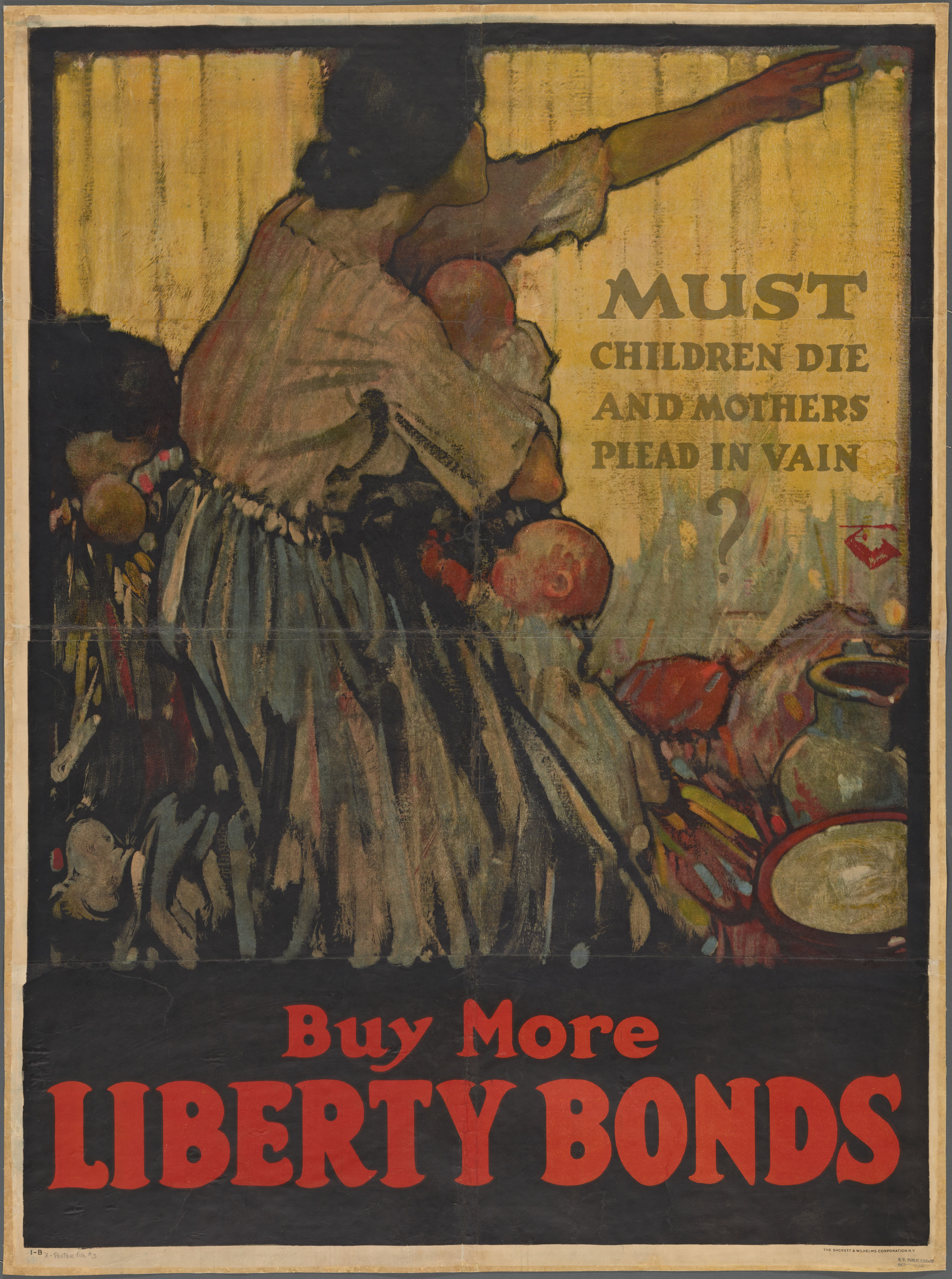
Walter H. Everett's poster for the Fourth Liberty Loan (1918)

Walter Hunt Everett (1880–1946) was an American artist, associated with the Brandywine School of art and the Golden Age of Illustration. Everett was a cover-artist and illustrator for books and national magazines such as Pictorial Review, The Saturday Evening Post, Colliers, Ladies’ Home Journal, and Scribner’s.

During his early career, Everett was a student of Howard Pyle (‘The Father of American Illustration’) at both the Drexel Institute and Brandywine School as well as a contemporary of N.C. Wyeth. Among the first wave of commercial illustrators in America, students taught by Pyle in the Brandywine School are credited with setting the standards for future American illustrators and often attributed key influences on such artists as Maxfield Parrish and Norman Rockwell. Staples of the Brandywine style included taking inspiration from U.S. culture and the artists' personal lives. Students of Pyle were encouraged to train hard, spiritually and artistically, to study first-hand the environments they painted and to utilize authentic props.

Later in his career, Everett helped to found the Philadelphia School of Industrial Art's Illustration Department and was an instructor to Norman Rockwell.

Little is known about Everett's final years, but it is known that he burned a large portion of his works that he considered personal projects. After his death his son, Oliver Everett, discovered a collection of 25-30 original oil paintings on canvas that had been rolled up in a barn on his property. These works remain in the Everett family and are understood to be the largest single collection of Walter H. Everett's work.
