= Olive Rush =

American painter

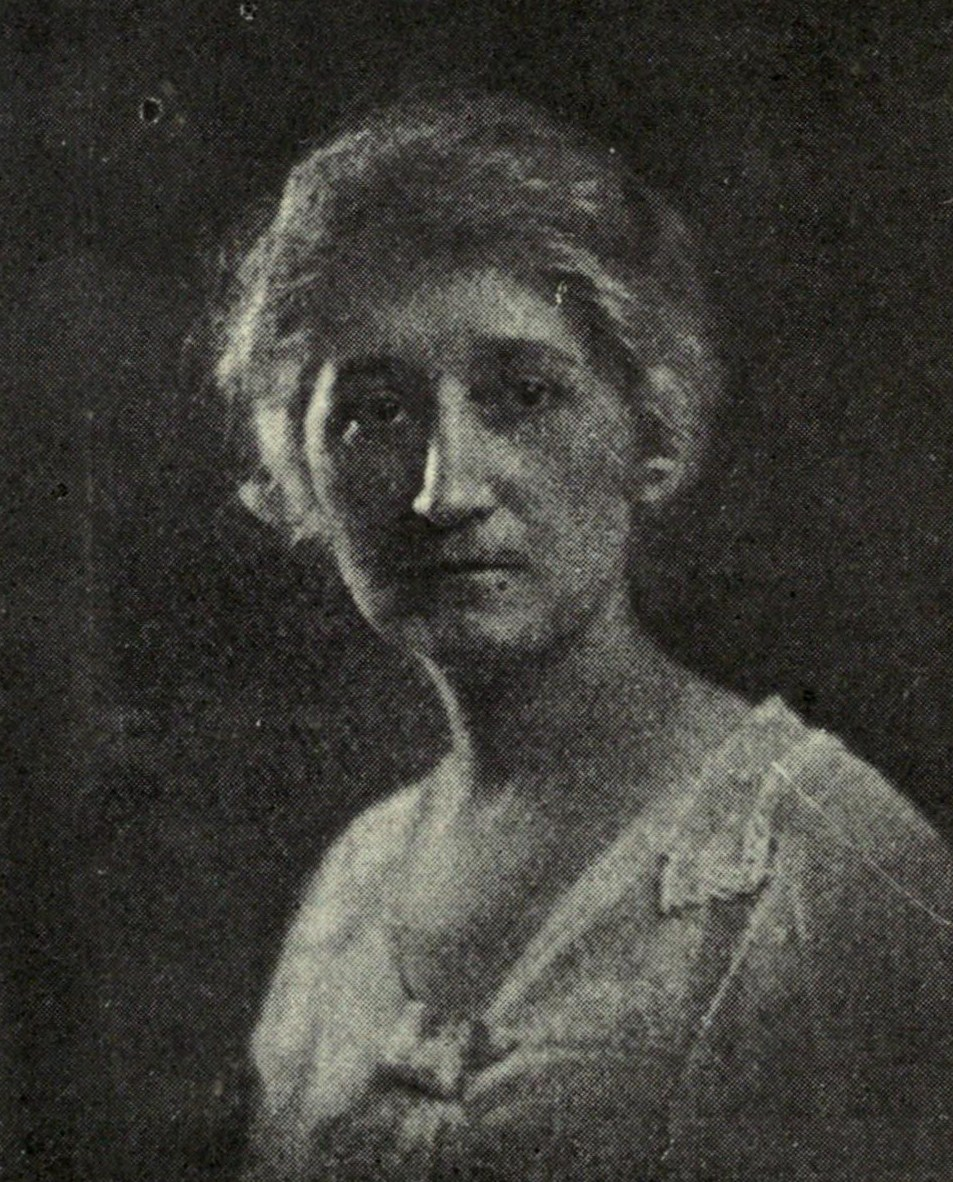
- Olive Rush, c. 1921
- Born: June 10, 1873; Fairmount, Indiana
- Died: August 20, 1966 (aged 93); Santa Fe, New Mexico
- Resting place: Park Cemetery, Fairmount, Indiana
- Education: Earlham College
- Known for: Painting

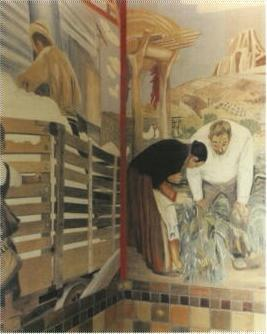
A portion of Olive Rush's May 1936 WPA mural at NMSU

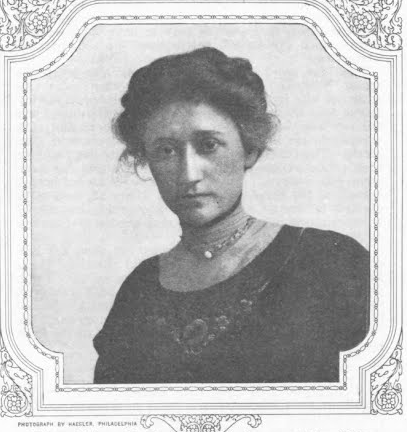
Olive Rush, from a 1912 publication

Olive Rush (June 10, 1873 near Fairmount, Indiana – August 20, 1966 in Santa Fe, New Mexico) was a painter, illustrator, muralist, and an important pioneer in Native American art education. Her paintings are held in a number of private collections and museums, including: the Brooklyn Museum of New York City, the Haan Mansion Museum of Indiana Art, the Indianapolis Museum of Art, Indiana and the Smithsonian American Art Museum.

== Early life ==
Rush was the fourth of Nixon and Louisa Rush's six children. The Rush family lived on a farm in Grant County, Indiana where they were members of the local Society of Friends. Olive kept diaries at the age of 13 in 1886, writing about her life, school lessons, and going sledding in Indiana winters. Part of the entries include working on a dialogue for class, going to lectures ("although it took some crying on my part"), and chores such as washing.

== Education ==
Olive Rush studied at Earlham College, the art school associated with the Corcoran Gallery of Art and at the Art Students League before becoming an illustrator in New York. She was well known for her portraits and paintings of children and women, many of which were featured in magazines such as Woman's Home Companion and St. Nicholas. In 1904 she moved to Wilmington, Delaware, to study with Howard Pyle, and she stayed until 1910. Upon Pyle's death in 1911, while on a trip to Italy, Rush was living in his studio along with Blanche Grant and Ethel Brown Leach. She spent the next year in Europe studying British and French painters, and finished her art education at the Boston Museum School in 1912. In 1913 Rush returned to Europe with her friend, the watercolorist Alice Schille, visiting Belgium and France. In 1947, Earlham College gave her an honorary Doctorate in Fine Arts.

== Career ==
In 1914 Rush, with her father, visited New Mexico and Arizona, and she had a one-person exhibition at the Palace of the Governors in Santa Fe. She made several visits to New Mexico over the next couple of years and moved permanently to Santa Fe in 1920. Despite the relative isolation of Santa Fe, Rush continued to contribute to national and international shows over the next thirty years, which activity culminated in a retrospective at the Museum of New Mexico Art Gallery in 1957.

Her former studio on Canyon Road in Santa Fe is now the Olive Rush Studio & Art Center, owned and operated as an artist's house museum. See https://www.oliverush.org for visiting days and public events.

Rush considered her major influences to be early Chinese art, Japanese art, and El Greco. She was also inspired by the colorful style of Hopi and other Puebloan artists of the 1930s and 1940s.

== Murals ==
Murals were produced from 1934 to 1943 in the United States through the Section of Painting and Sculpture, later called the Section of Fine Arts, of the Treasury Department. The murals were intended to boost the morale of the American people from the effects of the Depression by depicting uplifting subjects. Almost 850 artists were commissioned to paint 1371 murals, most of which were installed in post offices, libraries, and other public buildings. 162 of the artists were women. The murals were funded as a part of the cost of the construction with 1% of the cost set aside for artistic enhancements.

Olive Rush was commissioned by the Section of Fine Arts to complete painted murals for several public buildings in the American West. In Santa Fe, New Mexico she completed The Library Reaches the People, a fresco at the public library (now part of the New Mexico History Museum), as well as at the hotel La Fonda. In Pawhuska, Oklahoma she completed an oil on canvas mural, Osage Treaties for the post office. In Florence, Colorado she painted Antelope for the post office. Lastly, she completed two frescos, Cotton Industry and Farming and Natural History of Plant and Animal Life for the Foster Hall Biology Building at New Mexico State University. Also, her mural for the Maisel's Trading Post on Central in Albuquerque is still in place. She taught mural painting to students at the Santa Fe Indian School, which is now the Institute of American Indian Arts.

== Museum and gallery holdings ==
- Houston (MFA): The Huntress (c. 1938, watercolour)
- Indianapolis (MA): Woman at Loom (c. 1907, oil on academy board); On the Balcony (oil on canvas)
- Lincoln (Sheldon Memorial AG, University of Nebraska): Food Bearers (1923, oil on canvas)
- New York (Brooklyn Mus.): Deer Path (watercolour)
- Norman (Fred Jones Jr. MA, University of Oklahoma): The White Sands (with fox) (c. 1925, oil on panel)
- Roswell (Mus. and Art Center): Weird Land (c. 1934); The Apple from the Sea Returning (c. 1935, watercolour)
- Santa Fe (Mus. of New Mexico, MFA): collection of works, including After War - Frustration (oil); Indian Children at San Xavier (oil); Portrait of Mary Austin (c. 1933); Viaducts and Villages (c. 1950, watercolour)
- Washington DC (Phillips Collection): On the Mesa (c. 1925, oil on cardboard); Charros at Rodeo (1929, watercolour on board)
- Washington DC (Smithsonian American AM): Olive Rush papers, 1879–1967
- Wilmington (Delaware AM): Gazelle Grazing (oil); Interior of the Howard Pyle Studio (c. 1911, watercolour and pastel)
- Worcester (AM): Edge of the Forest (c. 1928, watercolour); Fallow Deer (c. 1928, watercolour over graphite)
- Santa Fe (Olive Rush Studio & Art Center)"Broken Pitcher" (oil); "Study for Moon Like a Flower in Heaven's High Bower" (watercolor); "Controversy in Heights (watercolor); "After the War - Hunger" and 24 other paintings

During Rush's lifetime, her paintings were acquired by numerous museums and many private collectors. One of her most famous paintings, Girl on Turquoise Horse, was purchased by Lou Hoover, wife of President Herbert Hoover. Earlham College has a gallery of her work. Some of her lesser known works are held by her closest living relatives, the Rush and Beasley family, in various parts of Indiana, the Carolinas and the West Coast, as well as Albuquerque and Santa Fe, New Mexico.
