= Harvey Dunn =

American painter (1884–1952)

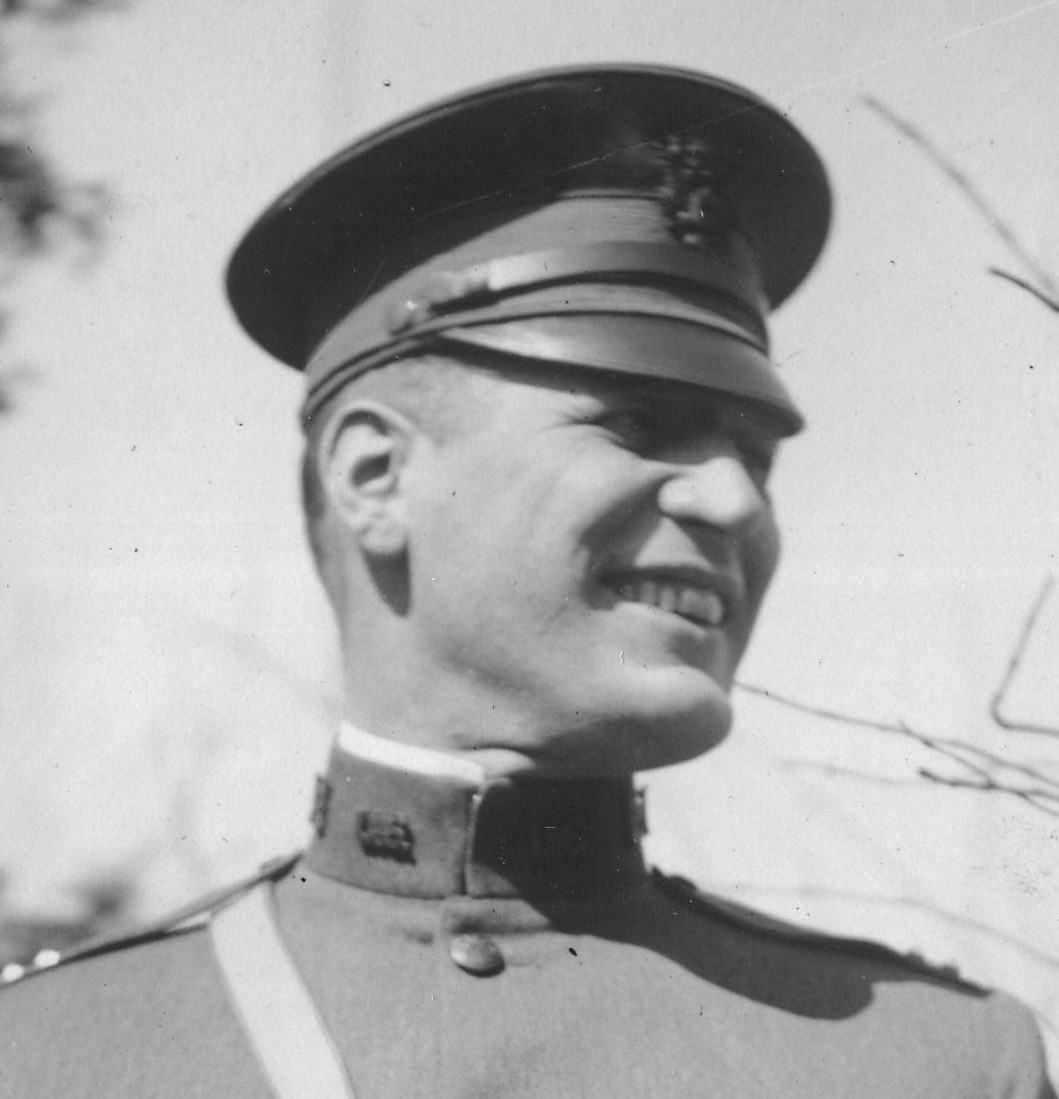
- Harvey Dunn in 1918
- Born: Harvey Thomas Dunn; March 8, 1884; Manchester, South Dakota, U.S.
- Died: October 29, 1952 (aged 68); Tenafly, New Jersey, U.S.
- Other name: J. Harvey Dunn
- Style: Brandywine School
- Spouse: Johanne (Krebs) Dunn
- Awards: Honorary Doctorate of Fine Arts degree from the South Dakota State College (1951)

Harvey Thomas Dunn NA, also known as J. Harvey Dunn (March 8, 1884 – October 29, 1952), was an American painter and teacher. During World War I, Dunn was an artist-correspondent with the American Expeditionary Forces in Europe. Most of Dunn's war sketches are housed at the Smithsonian Institution in the National Museum of American History in Washington, D.C. He is best known for his prairie-intimate masterpiece, The Prairie is My Garden (1950). In this painting, a mother and her two children are out gathering flowers from the quintessential prairie of the Great Plains.

== Early life ==
Dunn was born on a homestead farm near Manchester, South Dakota, in the county made famous by Laura Ingalls Wilder's descriptions of prairie life. His parents were Bersha and Thomas Dunn, a Canadian-American. Dunn had a younger brother Roy and an older sister Carolyn, who was also called Carrie. As a child, he attended a rural school.

Dunn attended the South Dakota Agricultural College (now South Dakota State University), in 1901 and 1902. He studied art under Ada Caldwell who encouraged Dunn to pursue his artistic studies in Wilmington, Delaware, under the instruction of Howard Pyle. Dunn was one of a small group of Pyle's students who were trend-setting illustrators, collectively known as the Brandywine School. There he also met William James Aylward and Ernest Peixotto, artists that would later accompany him in the United States Army American Expeditionary Force. Dunn also studied art in Chicago and New York.

== Career ==
=== Artist ===
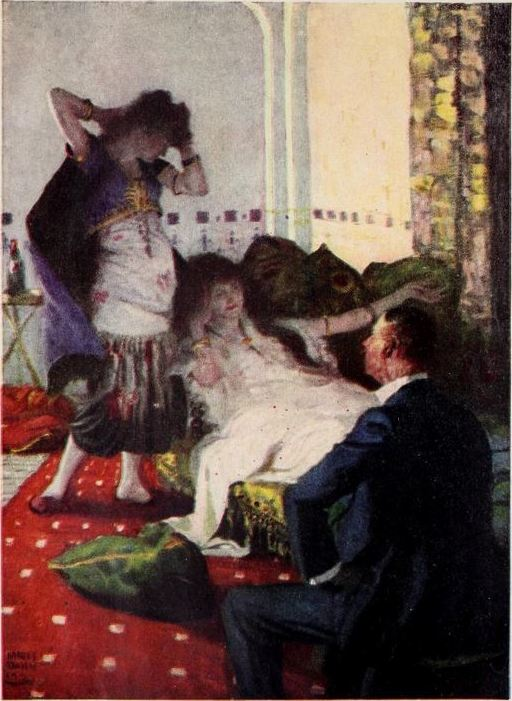
Illustration for a serialized novel in the June 1922 Harper's Magazine.

In 1906, after two years with Pyle, Dunn established his own studio in Wilmington and immediately began a successful career as an illustrator. He was a prodigious painter, able to produce (on one occasion) fifty-five completed paintings in eleven weeks for various clients. A contemporary described his style in these terms, “He literally attacked a canvas and sometimes I thought he would impale the painting with his brush.” In addition to his illustrations for books, Dunn's work by then was appearing regularly in such magazines as Collier's Weekly, Harper's Magazine, The Saturday Evening Post, and Scribner's.

In 1914, Dunn moved east and settled in Leonia, New Jersey, across the Hudson River from New York City and its publishing world. Inspired by Pyle's example, Dunn opened the Leonia School of Illustration in 1915 with artist Charles S. Chapman.

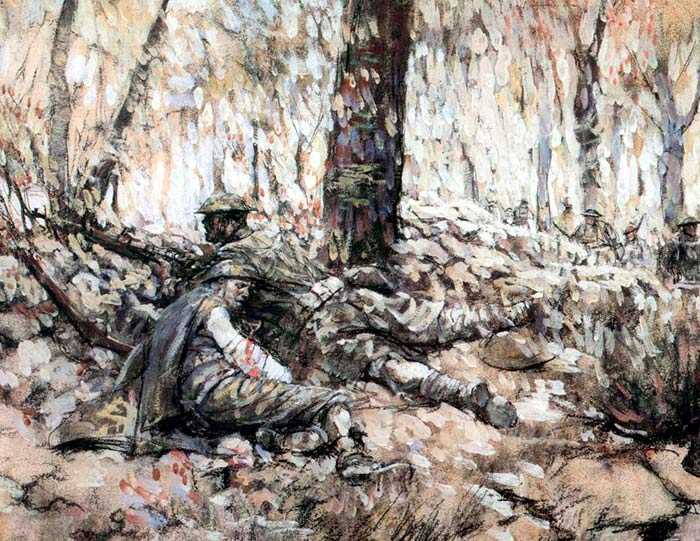
Photograph of the drawing Sunday Morning at Cunel, 1918, National Archives at College Park, Maryland

His experiences at the front as one of eight artist-correspondents with the American Expeditionary Force in Europe was a turning point for the artist. After the war, Dunn created works for The American Legion Monthly magazine and other national magazines. The majority of Dunn's war sketches are now housed at the Smithsonian Institution in the National Museum of American History in Washington, D.C.

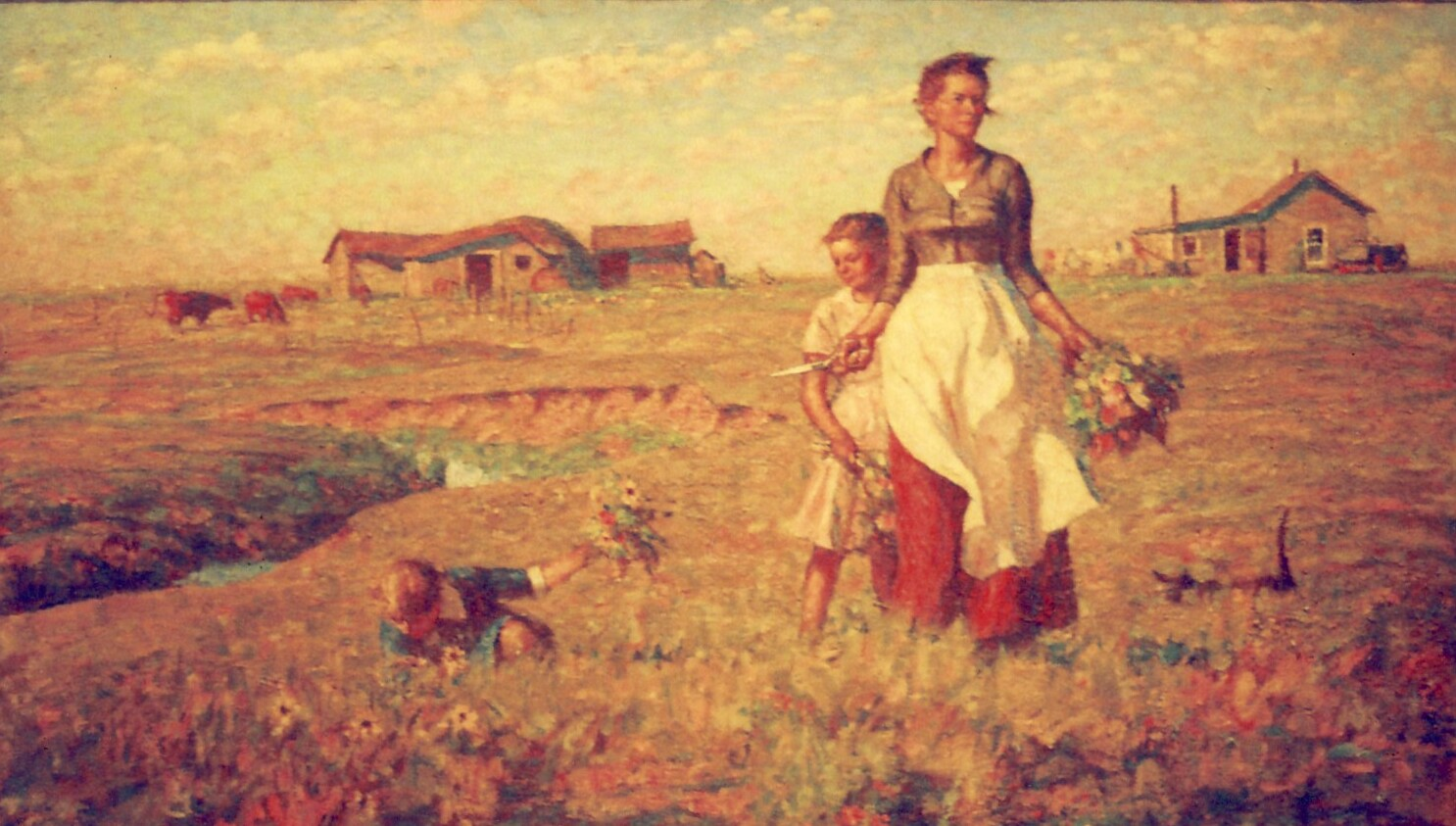
The Prairie is My Garden 1950, South Dakota State University

Dunn created a body of work of pioneer prairie scenes. The South Dakota Art Museum in Brookings, South Dakota, houses approximately 140 of Dunn's best works. Most of the works are on loan by people from DeSmet and Manchester, South Dakota, or were gifts of the artist and his family. His "often seen" painting Dakota Woman, from his series of strong pioneer women, is housed at the Dakota Discovery Museum in Mitchell, South Dakota. The Chuckwagon is a 1915 Dunn painting owned by the Denver Art Museum. The Smithsonian Institution notes it is a "quiet scene depicting a small group of cowboys seated on the ground beside a chuckwagon, their backs turned toward the viewer, their horses standing nearby, and a pond in the background."

=== Educator ===
Dunn became an influential teacher. The majority of Dunn's students were either graduate level painters or professional illustrators. Dunn was not interested in teaching painting techniques. His approach was philosophically–oriented. He spoke about spirit, emotions, and discourse at length. He discussed his philosophy of life and art, offered group criticism, and strode from easel to easel discussing each student's work in turn.

Later in life Dunn remarked: "The most fruitful and worthwhile thing I have ever done has been to teach." Dunn's most inspired teaching was probably achieved at the Grand Central School of Art, which was established by the Grand Central Art Galleries and located on the top floor of Grand Central Terminal in New York City. His comments were captured by a student during a five-hour class session and were published in 1934 in a slim volume titled An Evening in the Classroom.

Dunn was a demanding teacher and at times a harsh critic. He believed in preparing his students for the harsh realities and intense competition of the commercial world. Talent was not enough. As he once said, "If you ever amount to anything at all, it will be because you are true to that deep desire or ideal which made you seek artistic expression in pictures." His students included Dean Cornwell, James E. Allen, Harry Beckhoff, John Clymer, Mac Conner, Dan Content, Mario Cooper, Wilmot Emerton Heitland, Walt S. Louderback, Henry Clarence Pitz, Arthur Sarnoff, Mead Schaeffer, Harold Von Schmidt, Frank Street, and Saul Tepper.

=== Art organizations ===
In 1945, Dunn was named a member of the National Academy of Design. He was the president of the Society of Illustrators in 1948 and 1949. Dunn received an honorary Doctorate of Fine Arts degree from the South Dakota State College in 1951. He donated 37 paintings to the college.

== Personal life and death ==
Dunn married Johanne Louise Krebs, the daughter of Harvey Johannes Krebs, on March 12, 1908. N. C. Wyeth was Dunn's best man. The Dunns had a son Robert and a daughter Louise, who was married to John R. Rutherford.

Dunn died on October 29, 1952, at his home in Tenafly, New Jersey at the age of 68 from cancer. Johanne died on October 2, 1978, in Princeton, New Jersey. His name is memorialized by Harvey Dunn Elementary School, located in the eastern part of Sioux Falls, South Dakota.

== See also ==
- Arthur Roy Mitchell, friend and student
