= Frank Schoonover =

American illustrator (1877–1972)

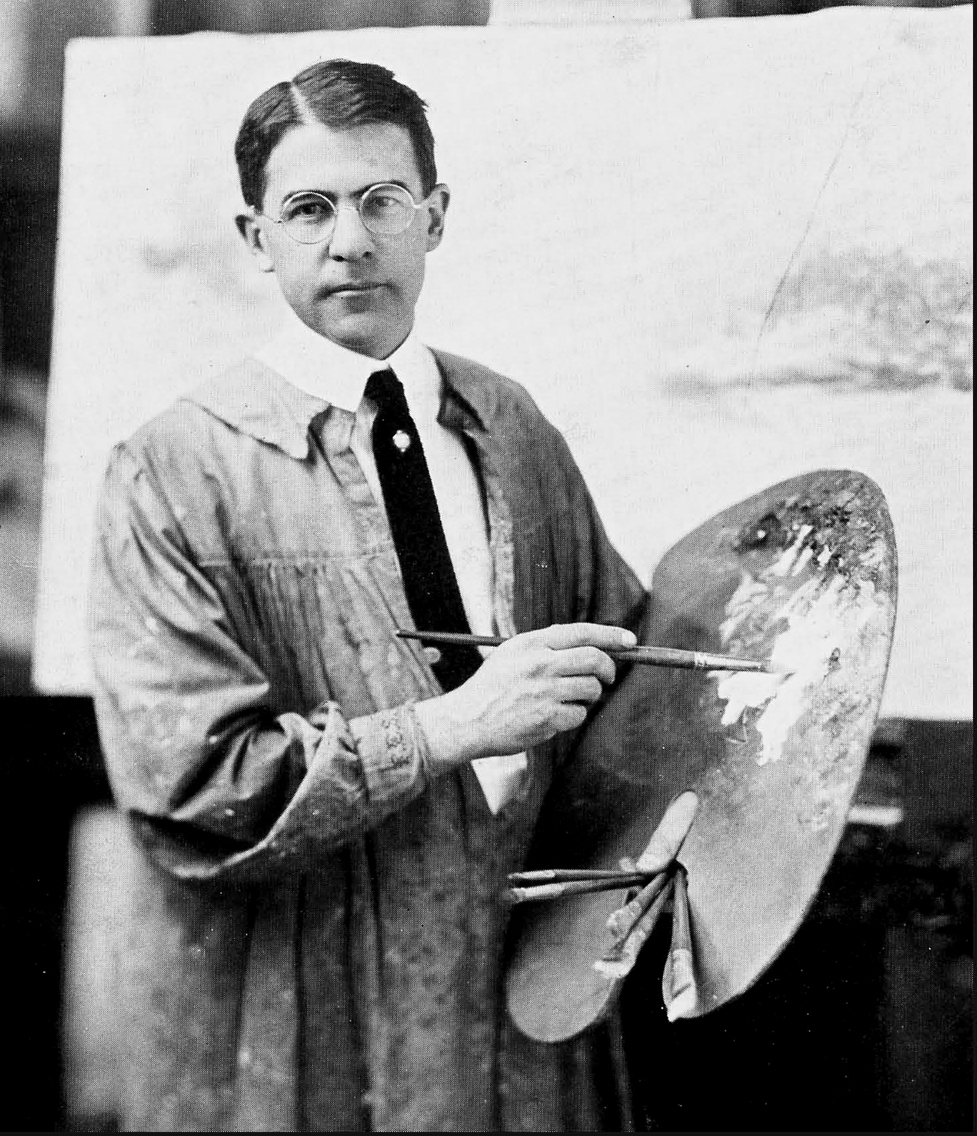
- Born: Frank Earle Schoonover; August 19, 1877; Oxford, New Jersey, U.S.
- Died: September 1, 1972 (aged 95); Wilmington, Delaware, U.S.
- Known for: Illustrator
- Style: Brandywine School

Frank Earle Schoonover (August 19, 1877 – September 1, 1972) was an American illustrator. A member of the Brandywine School, he was a contributing illustrator to magazines and did more than 5,000 paintings.

== Early life ==
Schoonover was born on August 19, 1877, in Oxford, New Jersey. He studied under Howard Pyle at the Drexel Institute in Philadelphia.

== Career ==
Schoonover became part of what would be known as the Brandywine School when he opted to study art rather than ministry. A prolific contributor to books and magazines during the early twentieth century, the so-called "Golden Age of Illustration", he illustrated stories as diverse as Clarence Mulford's Hopalong Cassidy stories and Edgar Rice Burroughs's A Princess of Mars. In 1918 and 1919, he produced a series of paintings along with Gayle Porter Hoskins illustrating the American forces in World War I for a series of souvenir prints published in the Ladies Home Journal. Over the course of his career, he made more than 5,000 paintings, many of which were influenced by his travels and the people he met.

Schoonover helped to organize what is now the Delaware Art Museum and was chairman of the fundraising committee charged with acquiring works by Howard Pyle. In his later years he restored paintings including some by Pyle and turned to easel paintings of the Brandywine and Delaware landscapes. He also gave art lessons, established a small art school in his studio, designed stained glass windows, and dabbled in science fiction art (illustrating Edgar Rice Burroughs' A Princess of Mars), he was known locally as the "Dean of Delaware Artists".

=== Alvin York painting ===
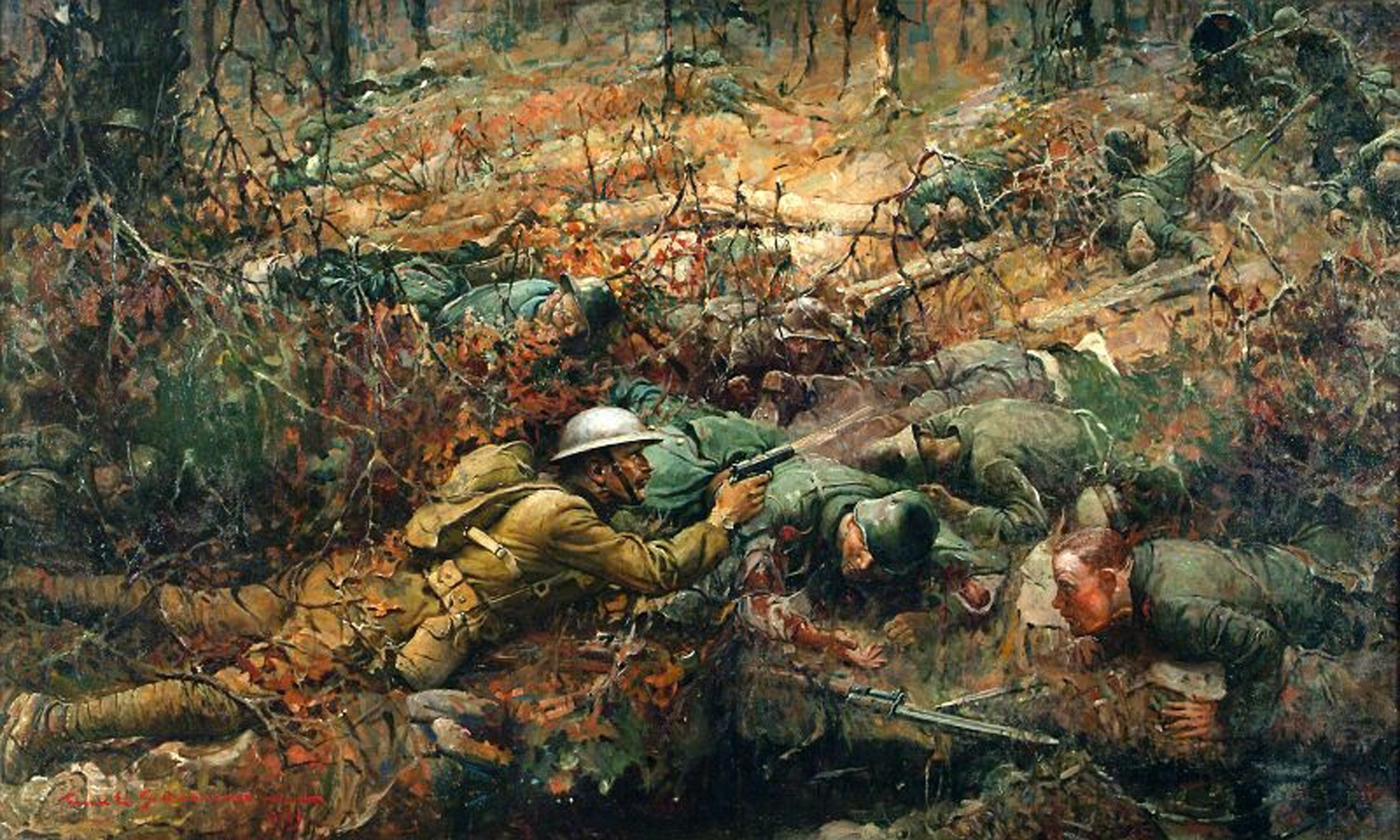
Sergeant Alvin C. York (1919)

Schoonover's name received national attention in 2011 when his painting of World War I hero Alvin York was returned to York's home state of Tennessee. Businessman and philanthropist Allan Jones of Cleveland, Tennessee, purchased the painting on Veteran's Day from the Blakeslee Gallery in Wellington, Florida.

Jones said, "When I learned that Mr. Blakeslee would consider selling the painting to the right buyer, I felt it was essential to bring this piece back to its rightful home in Tennessee and have the painting here on Veterans Day 11-11-11".

== Death and legacy ==
Schoonover died on September 1, 1972, aged 95, in Wilmington, Delaware. The Delaware Art Museum and the Hagley Library maintain an archive of his work and a number of his paintings are held at the Delaware Art Museum.

Schoonover's studio in Wilmington is listed on the National Register of Historic Places.

== Gallery ==
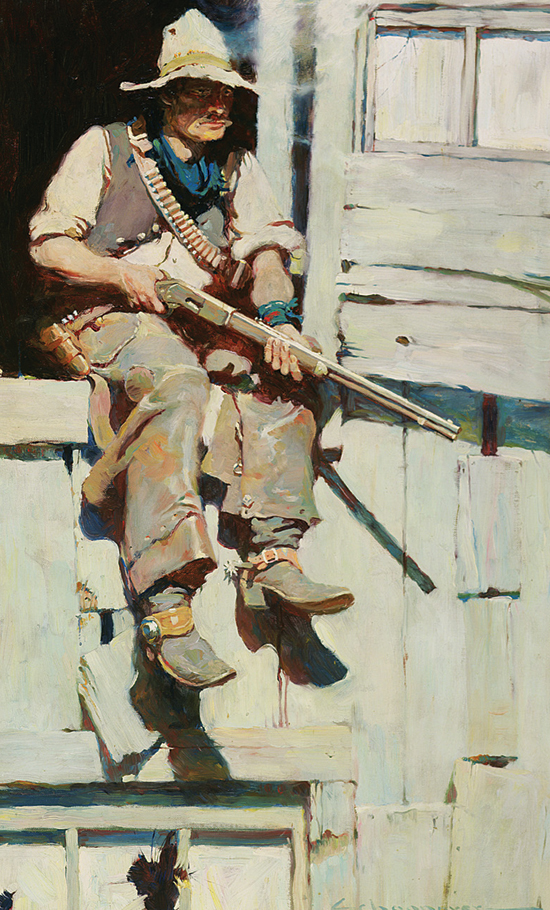
Hopalong Takes Command, 1905. Oil on canvas

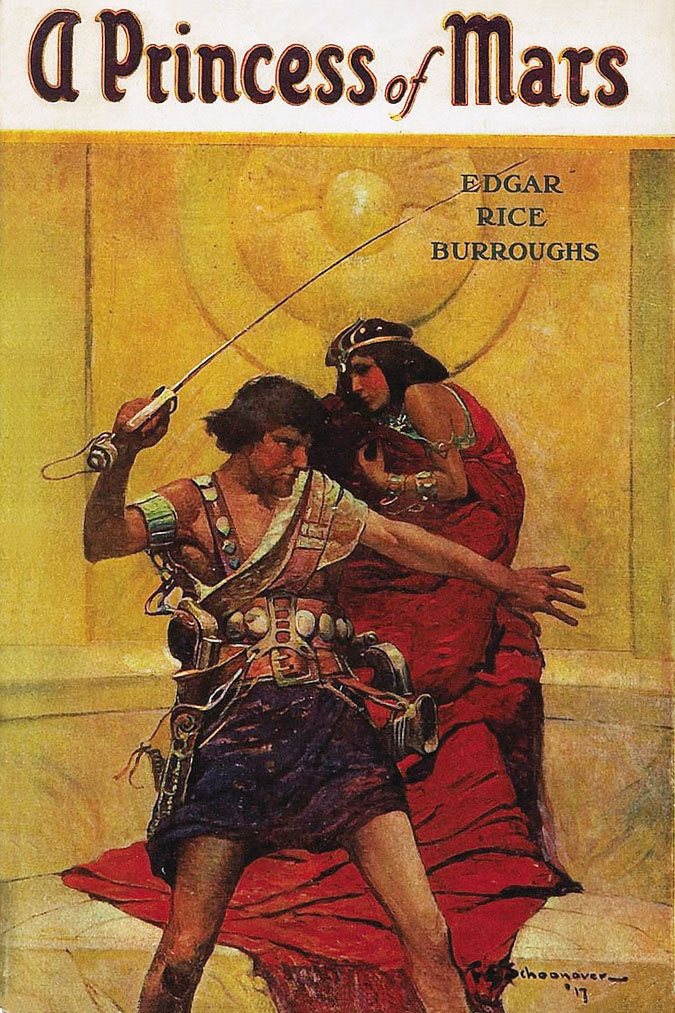
Cover illustration of Edgar Rice Burroughs's A Princess of Mars, 1917

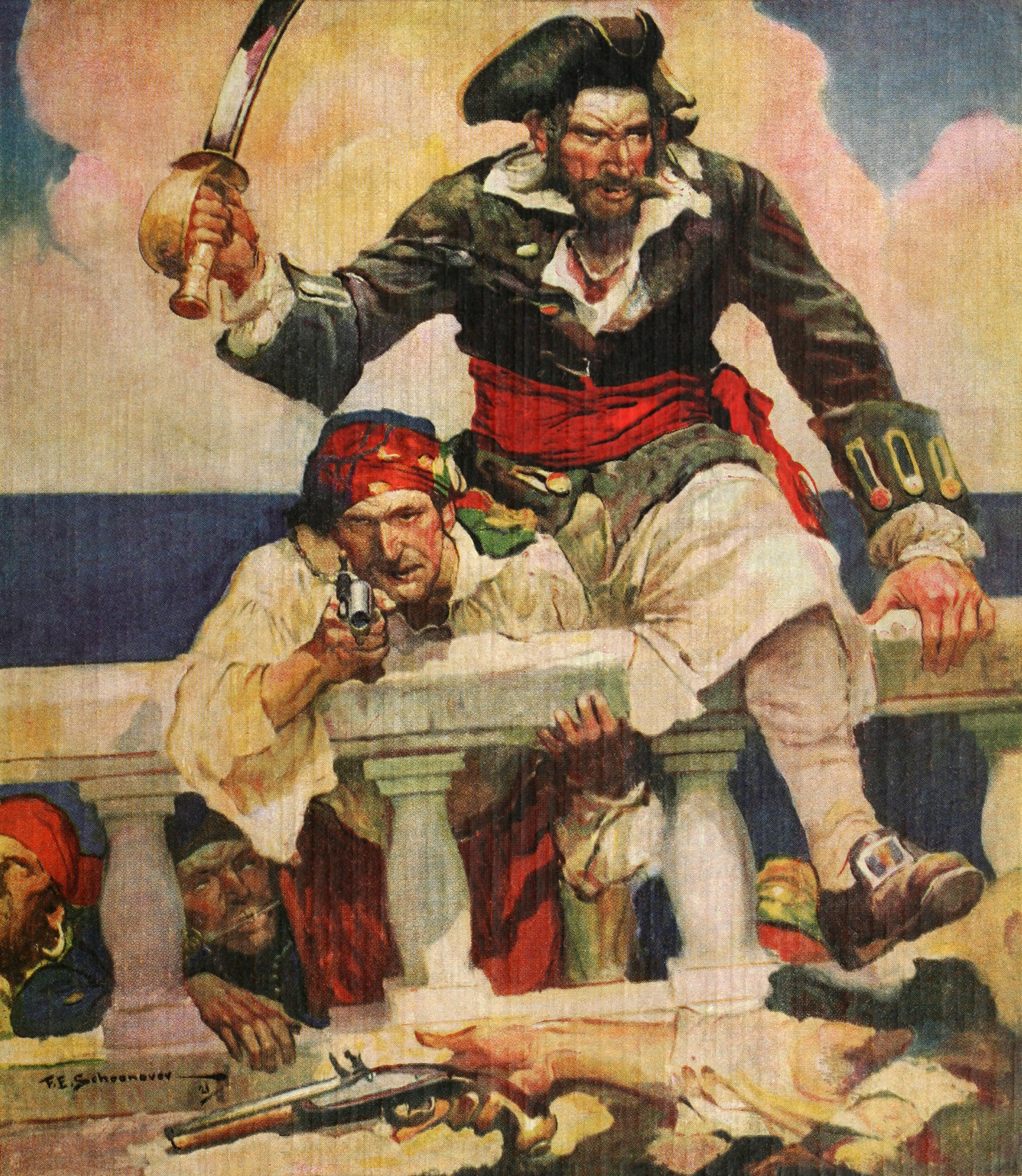
Cover of Blackbeard, Buccaneer, 1922

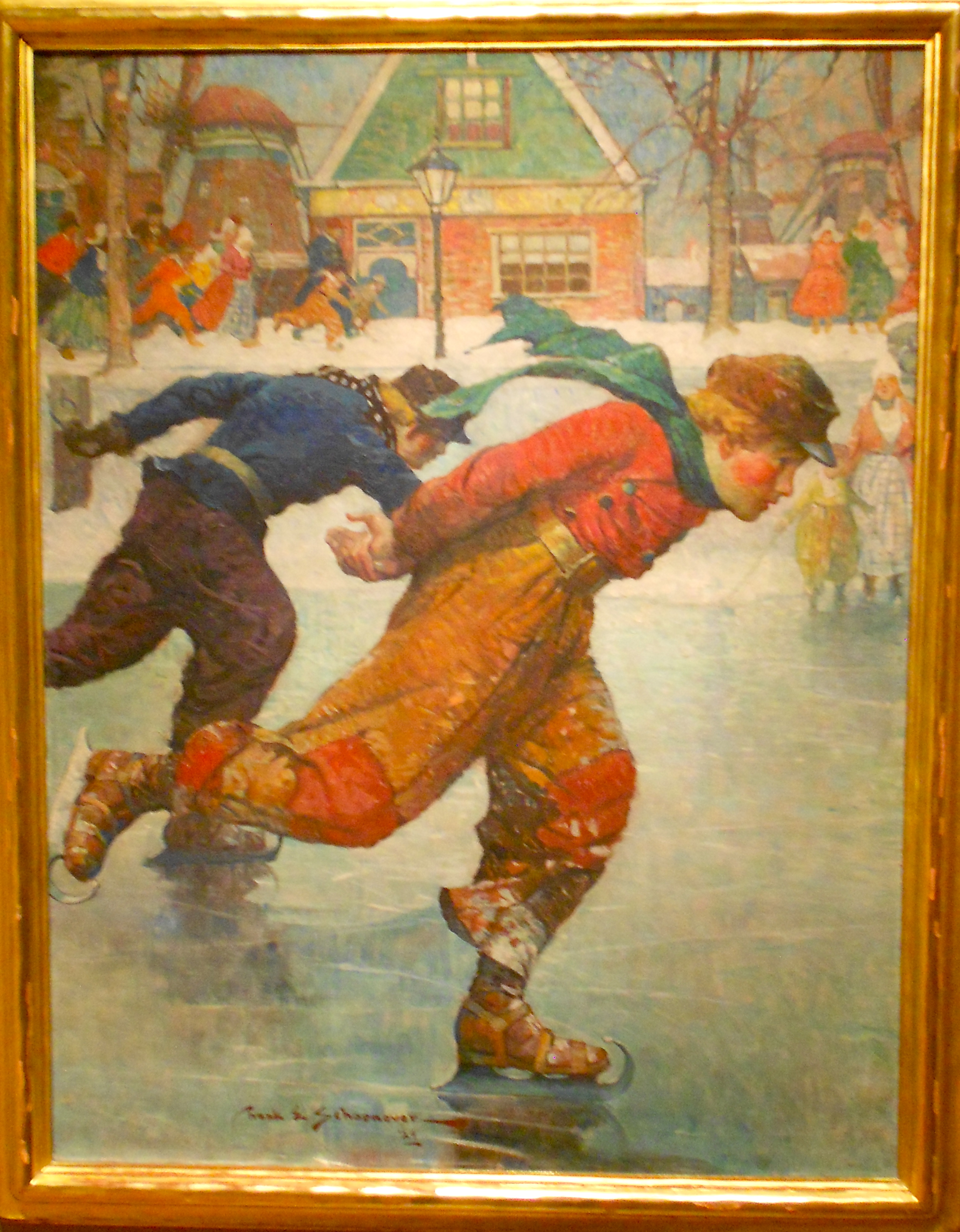
Hans Brinker

== Sources ==
- Laurence S Cutler; Judy Goffman Cutler; National Museum of American Illustration. Maxfield Parrish and the American Imagists. Edison, NJ: Wellfleet Press, 2004. ISBN 0-7858-1817-0; ISBN 978-0-7858-1817-5
- Harrington, Peter, "Images of the Great War," American History, Vol. XXXI, No. 5, Nov-Dec. 1996, pp. 30–36, 64
- Harrington, Peter, "The Great War Paintings of Frank E. Schoonover," Military Heritage, No. 1, August 1999, pp. 66–69.
