= Sloan =

Sloan may refer to:

== Organizations ==
- MIT Sloan School of Management, at the Massachusetts Institute of Technology, US
- Sloan Valve Company, a manufacturer of plumbing systems
- Alfred P. Sloan Foundation, a philanthropic organization

== Places ==
=== United States ===
- Sloan Canyon National Conservation Area, a site protected by the Bureau of Land Management
- Sloan, Indiana, an extinct town in Warren County
- Sloan, Iowa, a city in Woodbury County
- Sloan, Nevada, an unincorporated community in Clark County
- Sloan, New York, a village in Erie County
- Sloan, Texas, an unincorporated community in San Saba County
- Sloan Creek (disambiguation)
- Sloan Lake (Minnesota), a lake in Minnesota
- Sloan Peak, a mountain in Washington state
- Sloan Lake (Colorado), a lake
- Sloan Site, a Paleo-Indian Dalton cemetery in Arkansas

=== Elsewhere ===
- Mount Sloan, a mountain in British Columbia, Canada

== Science ==
- Sloan Digital Sky Survey, a major astronomical survey
  - Sloan Great Wall, a galactic filament discovered by the Sloan Digital Sky Survey

== Other uses ==
- Sloan (surname)
- Sloan (band), a Canadian rock band
- Sloan Fellows, a mid-career master's degree program in general management
- Sloan Research Fellowship, a research grant to young scientists and scholars

== See also ==
- Sloane (disambiguation)
- Slone (disambiguation)
- Justice Sloan (disambiguation)
