= Sloan (surname) =

Sloan is a Scottish and Irish surname. Notable people with the surname include:

- A. Scott Sloan (1820–1895), American lawyer
- Alan Macfarlane Sloan (1925–1948), British soldier
- Alfred P. Sloan (1875–1966), the long-time president and chairman of General Motors
- Bridget Sloan (born 1992), American artistic gymnast, 2008 Olympic Silver medalist and NCAA Champion
- Cle Shaheed Sloan (born 1963), American actor, activist and technical advisor
- Cliff Sloan, American lawyer and academic
- Derek Sloan (born 1984), Canadian politician
- Dulcé Sloan, American comedian, actress, and writer
- Ed Sloan (born 1973), American musician, member of the band Crossfade
- Helen Farr Sloan (1911–2005), artist, educator, and patron of the arts
- Hugh W. Sloan, Jr. (born 1940), American political aide, treasurer of Richard Nixon's 1972 campaign committee
- Harry E. Sloan (born 1950), American SPAC founder; former chairman of MGM and SBS Broadcasting
- Ian Sloan (field hockey)
- Ian Sloan (born 1938), Australian mathematician
- Ithamar Sloan (1822–1898), American lawyer
- Jerry Sloan (1942–2020), American basketball player and coach, most famous for his long tenure as coach of the Utah Jazz
- Jessica Sloan (born 1982), Canadian paralympic swimmer
- Jill S. Barnholtz-Sloan, American biostatistician and data scientist
- John French Sloan (1871–1951), American painter
- Judith Sloan (born 1954), Australian economist and business journalist
- Kim Sloan, Canadian art historian
- Melanie Sloan (born 1965), executive director of Citizens for Responsibility and Ethics in Washington
- Norm Sloan (1926–2003), American basketball coach
- P. F. Sloan (1945–2015), American songwriter and musician
- Paddy Sloan (1921–1993), Ireland international footballer and coach
- Richard Elihu Sloan (1857–1933), American politician, Governor of Arizona Territory (1909–1912)
- Sasha Alex Sloan (born 1995), American singer-songwriter
- Steve Sloan (1944–2024), American football coach
- Stewart Sloan, Scottish-born Hong Kong author
- Timothy J. Sloan (born 1960/61), American banker, CEO of Wells Fargo
- Tod Sloan (disambiguation), multiple people
- Tommy Sloan (1925–2010), Scottish footballer
- Victor Sloan (born 1945), Irish visual artist
- William Gibson Sloan (1838–1914), Scottish evangelist to the Faroe Islands

== Fictional characters ==
- Sloane Peterson, a character in the 1986 film Ferris Bueller's Day Off
- Inspector C. D. "Seedy" Sloan, a character in the Sloan and Crosby novels
- Luther Sloan, a character in Star Trek
- Mark Sloan (Grey's Anatomy), a character in the TV series Grey's Anatomy
- Dr. Mark Sloan, the protagonist of the TV series Diagnosis: Murder
- Matron Margaret "Maggie" Sloan, a character in the TV series A Country Practice
- Police Detective/Lieutenant Steve Sloan, son of Mark Sloan in the TV series Diagnosis: Murder
- Walker Sloan, an antagonist in the video game Spider-Man: Edge of Time

== See also ==
- Sloane (surname)
- Sloan (disambiguation)
