= Cape Girardeau Township, Cape Girardeau County, Missouri =

Inactive township in the US state of Missouri

Cape Girardeau Township
- Township
- Coordinates: 37°18′46″N 089°32′25″W
- Country: United States
- State: Missouri
- County: Cape Girardeau

Area
  - Total: 70.5 sq mi (182.5 km^{2})
  - Land: 67.08 sq mi (173.73 km^{2})
  - Water: 3.39 sq mi (8.77 km^{2}) 4.81%
- Elevation: 390 ft (119 m)

Population (2000)
  - Total: 37,778
  - Density: 563/sq mi (217.5/km^{2})
- FIPS code: 29-11260
- GNIS feature ID: 0766397

Cape Girardeau Township is one of ten townships in Cape Girardeau County, Missouri, USA. As of the 2000 census, its population was 37,778.

== History ==
Cape Girardeau Township was founded in 1807. The township took its name from the city of Cape Girardeau.

== Geography ==
Cape Girardeau Township covers an area of 70.46 square miles (182.5 km^{2}) and contains one incorporated settlement, Cape Girardeau. It contains fifteen cemeteries: County Memorial Park, Davis, Fairmon, Hitt, Hitt, Hitt, Lorimier, McGuire, Mount Auburn, Nunn, Old Hanover, Saint Marys, Salem, Shady Grove and Suedekum.

The streams of Cape La Croix Creek, Flora Creek, Juden Creek, Ramsey Branch, Randol Creek, Ranney Creek, Scism Creek and Sloan Creek run through this township.

== Transportation ==
Cape Girardeau Township contains two airports or landing strips: Saint Francis Hospital Heliport and Southeast Missouri Hospital Heliport.
