= Sloane (surname) =

Sloane is a surname. It is a variant to the Gaelic name Sloan. Notable people with the surname include:

== Academics ==
- Bonnie Sloane (born 1944), American cancer researcher
- Hans Sloane (1660–1753), Irish physician and collector
- Neil Sloane (born 1939), British-American mathematician
- Thomas Gibson Sloane (1858–1932), Australian entomologist
- William Milligan Sloane (1850–1928), American historian

== Artists ==
- Mary Annie Sloane (1867–1961), British artist
- Patricia Hermine Sloane (1934–2001), American artist
- Eric Sloane (1905–1985), American artist

== Authors and editors ==
- Anna Bogenholm Sloane (1867–1940), Swedish-American author
- Emily Vanderbilt Sloane (1874–1970), American author and socialite
- T. O'Conor Sloane (1851–1940), editor of Scientific American
- T. O'Conor Sloane III (1912–2003), American editor
- William Milligan Sloane III (1906–1974), American publisher and author

== Businesspeople ==
- Henry T. Sloane (1845–1937), American businessman
- Howard Sloane (born 1950), American philanthropist
- Hugh Sloane (born 1956), British businessman
- Marshall M. Sloane (1926–2019), American businessman
- William Douglas Sloane (1844–1915), American businessman

== Composers ==
- Alfred Baldwin Sloane (1872–1925), American songwriter
- Asteryth Sloane (born 2000), British composer

== Performers ==
- Barry Sloane (born 1981), English actor
- Doreen Sloane (1934–1990), British actress
- Everett Sloane (1909–1965), American actor
- Lindsay Sloane (born 1977), American actress
- Olive Sloane (1895–1963), British actress
- Sidney Sloane (born 1967), stage name of British actor and presenter Gary Gibson

== Politicians ==
- Charles A. Sloane (1850–1912), American farmer and politician
- Hans Sloane (MP) (1739–1927), British politician
- Harvey I. Sloane (born 1936), American physician and politician
- Jonathan Sloane (1785–1854), American politician
- Kellie Sloane, Australian journalist and politician
- Logan Sloane (1918–1980), New Zealand politician
- Ted Sloane (1903–1984), American politician

== Scriptwriters ==
- Allan Sloane (1914–2001), American screenwriter
- Francesca Sloane, American screenwriter
- Michael Sloane (born 1959), American screenwriter
- Paul Sloane (1893–1963), American screenwriter and director
- Peggy Sloane (1943–2009), American screenwriter

== Singers ==
- Carol Sloane (1937–2023), American jazz singer
- Sally Sloane (1894–1982), Australian singer and musician

== Sportspeople ==
- Cedric Sloane (1915–1992), Australian skier
- David Sloane (born 1985), American hockey player
- Jimmy Sloane (1866–1947), Scottish footballer
- Pat Sloane (born 1980), Irish hurler
- Peter Sloane (born 1948), New Zealand rugby union player
- Roberto Sloane (born 1925), Mexican Olympic sailor
- Rory Sloane (born 1990), Australian footballer
- Shae Sloane (born 1992), Australian footballer
- Susan Sloane (born 1970), American tennis player
- James "Tod" Sloane (1874–1933), American jockey

== Others ==
- Eric Sloane, pen name of American illustrator Everard Jean Hinrichs
- George Benedict Sloane (1898–1958), American philatelist
- Isabel Dodge Sloane (1896–1962), American horse breeder
- Niall Sloane (born 1980), Irish clergyman
- Nick Sloane (born 1961), a marine salvage expert, especially on Costa Concordia in September 2013
- Rick Sloane (born 1961), American film director
- Steven Sloane (born 1958), Israeli-American conductor
- T. O'Conor Sloane Jr. (1879–1963), American photographer
- William A. Sloane (1854–1930), American jurist

== Fictional characters ==
- Lone Sloane, science fictional character created by Philippe Druilet
- Terry Sloane, fictional character better known as the first Mister Terrific

== See also ==
- Sloan (surname)
- Sloane (disambiguation)
- W. & J. Sloane, chain of furniture stores
- Ursula Bloom, British writer whose pen names included "Sara Sloane"
- John Sloane (disambiguation)
- Martin Sloane, a 2001 novel
- Michael Sloane (disambiguation)
