= John Sloan (disambiguation) =

John Sloan (1871–1951) was an American painter and etcher.

John Sloan may also refer to:

== Business ==
- John Sloan (businessman) (c. 1904–1988), American businessman
- John Sloan Jr. (c. 1936–1991), American banking executive

== Film and TV ==
- John Sloan (actor), American actor, in 2014 webseries Farmed and Dangerous
- John R. Sloan (1912–2001), British film producer
- John Peter Sloan (1969–2020), English-born Italian actor, comedian and writer

== Other people ==
- John Sloan, early settler at Sloan Lake, U.S.
- John Sloan (medium) (fl. 1920s), Scottish spiritualist
- Kee Sloan (John McKee Sloan, born 1955), American bishop

== See also ==
- John Sloane (disambiguation)
- Jonathan Sloane (1785–1854), U.S. Representative from Ohio
