= Slone =

Slone is a surname. Notable people with the surname include:

- Carl Slone (c. 1937–2020), American basketball coach
- Cian Slone (born 2002), American football player
- Philip Slone (1907–2003), U.S. soccer player
- Ricca Slone, Canadian-born American politician
- Richard T. Slone (born 1974), English painter
- Tara Slone (born 1973), Canadian rock vocalist, actor and TV personality
- Verna Mae Slone (1914–2009), American writer
- Doctor Slone, a fictional character from the video game Fortnite

== See also ==
- Slone Glacier, Antarctica
- Słone (disambiguation), various places in Poland
- Sloan (disambiguation)
- Sloane (disambiguation)
