= Sloan Lake =

Sloan Lake may refer to:

- Sloan Lake (Colorado)
- Sloan Lake (Minnesota)
