= Sloane =

Sloane may refer to:

== People ==
- Sloane (surname)
  - Hans Sloane (1660–1753), Irish physician, naturalist, and collector
- Sloane (given name)

== Places ==
- Sloane, New South Wales, Australia
- Sloane Square, a square in London
- Sloane Street, London, which terminates at Sloane Square
- Sloane Square tube station, a London Underground station near Sloane Square

== Arts and entertainment ==
=== Film and television ===
- Entertaining Mr Sloane, a 1964 play by Joe Orton
  - Entertaining Mr Sloane (film), the 1970 film version of the play by Joe Orton
- Sloane (film), a 1984 action movie starring Robert Resnik
- Mr. Sloane, a 2014 British television series
- Miss Sloane, a 2016 American political thriller starring Jessica Chastain

=== Fictional characters ===
- Arvin Sloane, a character in the American TV series Alias
- Lily Sloane, a character in Star Trek
- Lone Sloane, a character in the sci-fi comics of Druillet
- Sloane Peterson, Ferris Bueller's girlfriend in the movie Ferris Bueller's Day Off

== Other uses ==
- Sloane Ranger or Sloane, a stereotypical upper-middle or upper-class British person

== See also ==
- Urania sloanus or Sloane's urania, a species of moth
- Sloan (disambiguation)
- Slone (disambiguation)
