= Sloane (given name) =

- Gender: Unisex
- Language: English

Origin
- Meaning: Transferred use of Irish surname Sloane

Sloane or Sloan is a given name, a transferred use of the Irish surname Ó Sluaghadháin, meaning "descendant of Sluaghadhán". Sluaghadhán is an Irish diminutive form of the Irish name Sluaghadh, which means expedition or raid. The name has associations with the Sloane Rangers, a British subculture referring to the tastes and preferences of the stereotypical British upper middle class woman who lived at Sloane Square in West London.

== Usage ==
The name has been among the top 1,000 names for newborn girls in the United States since 2009 and among the top 200 since 2018. It has been among the top 100 names for newborn girls in Canada since 2017. The name is also in use for boys, though it has never ranked among the 1,000 most popular names given to boys in the United States.

== Women ==
- Sloane Blakely (born 2002), American gymnast
- Sloane Crosley (born 1979), American writer
- Sloane Frost, American libertarian
- Sloane Leong (born 1990), American cartoonist, artist and writer
- Sloan MacKenzie (born 2002), Canadian canoeist
- Sloan Siegrist (born 1980), American-Guamanian athlete
- Sloan Simpson (1916–1996), American fashion consultant, television and radio personality, fashion model, and actress
- Sloane Stephens (born 1991), American professional tennis player
- Sloane U'Ren, British-American art director
- Sloan Wainwright (born 1957), American musician

== Men ==
- Sloane Citron (born 1956), American publisher
- Sloan Doak (1886–1965), American horse rider
- Sloan DuRoss (born 1976), American rower
- Sloane Farrington (1923–1997), Bahamian competitive sailor and Olympic medalist
- Sloane Gordon (1871–1926), American political writer
- Sloan D. Gibson (born 1952/1953), American politician
- Sloan Nibley (1908–1990), American screenwriter
- Sloan Privat (born 1989), French professional footballer
- Sloan Struble (born 1999), American singer, songwriter, and producer
- Sloan Thomas (born 1981), American football player
- Sloan Wilson (1920–2003), American writer

== Fictional characters ==
- Sloan McQuewick, a character in Entourage
- Sloane Peterson, a character in the 1986 film Ferris Bueller's Day Off
- Sloan Riley, a character in the television series Grey's Anatomy
- Sloan Sabbith, a character on the American television series The Newsroom
- Sloan Cameron, a character from the video game Overwatch 2
- Slone, a character from the video game Titanfall 2

== See also ==
- Sloane Jacobs, ring name of American professional wrestler and taekwondo practitioner Amelia Herr (born 2003)
