= David Lund =

American painter (1925–2023)

- Born: Nathan David Lifschitz; October 16, 1925; New York City, New York, U.S.
- Died: November 6, 2023 (aged 98)
- Occupation: Artist

Academic work
- Discipline: Art
- Institutions: Fashion Institute of Technology; Cooper Union; New York University

David Lund (born Nathan David Lifschitz, October 16, 1925 – November 6, 2023) was an American artist who was associated with the abstract expressionist painters of the New York School. His landscape oils done in the 1950s are exemplary of the bold combination of form, color and texture for which this group is celebrated. Lund taught at Cooper Union, Parsons, New York University, Fashion Institute of Technology, the Metropolitan Museum, the 92nd Street Y, the National Academy School of Fine Arts, and Columbia University.

== Biography ==
Lund was born as Nathan David Lifschitz in New York City on October 16, 1925. Some of his later exhibitions included the Turtle Gallery, Maine; HHAR Gallery, New York; Wingspread Gallery, Maine; Allport Associates Gallery, San Francisco; Bixby Hall, Washington University in St. Louis; Sehwig Gallery, St. Louis; numerous shows at the Grace Borgenicht Gallery; Maine State Museum; Colby College, Maine; Worcester Art Museum; Butler Institute of American Art; Mid-America Arts Alliance; Pennsylvania Academy of Fine Art; numerous shows at the National Academy Museum; New York Studio School; and the Toledo Museum of Art. His work is included in the collections of the Corcoran Gallery of Art; McNay Art Institute, San Antonio, Texas; Delaware Art Museum; Johnson Museum, Cornell University; Fort Worth Art Center; and the Whitney Museum of American Art.

Lund was the recipient of two Fulbright Fellowships, Rome; the Hassam Purchase Award, American Academy of Arts and Letters; and the Benjamin Altman Prize, National Academy He died on November 6, 2023, at the age of 98.

== Photo gallery ==
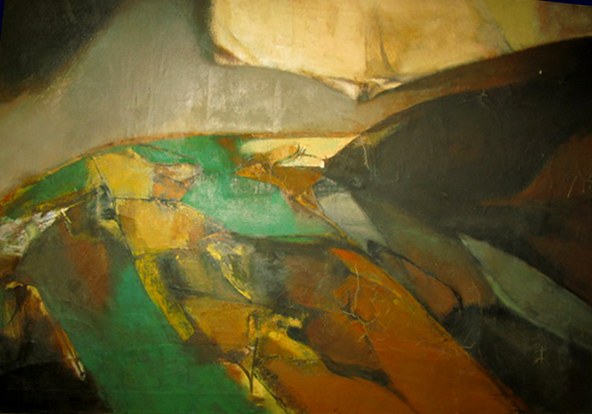
"Spain 1955"
