= Judge Sloan =

Judge Sloan may refer to:

- Richard Elihu Sloan (1857–1933), judge of the United States District Court for the District of Arizona
- William Boyd Sloan (1895–1970), judge of the United States District Court for the Northern District of Georgia

== See also ==
- Justice Sloan (disambiguation)
