= Delaware Art Museum =

Art museum in Delaware, USA

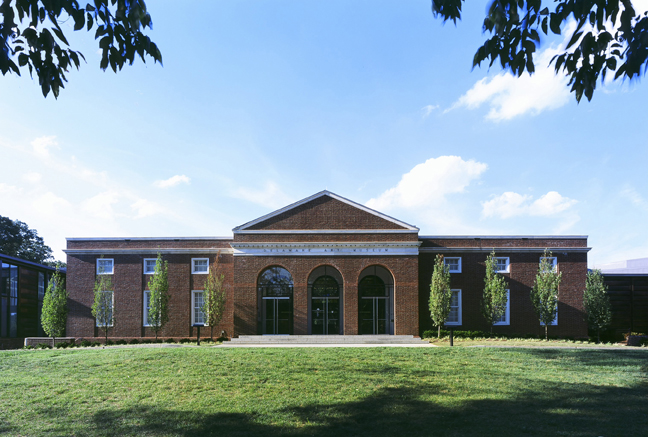
- Exterior view
- Interactive fullscreen map
- Established: 1912
- Location: 2301 Kentmere Parkway, Wilmington, Delaware 19806, USA 302.571.9590
- Coordinates: 39°45′55″N 75°33′53″W
- Type: Art museum
- Director: Molly Giordano
- Curator: Heather Campbell Coyle
- Public transit access: DART First State bus: 10
- Website: www.delart.org

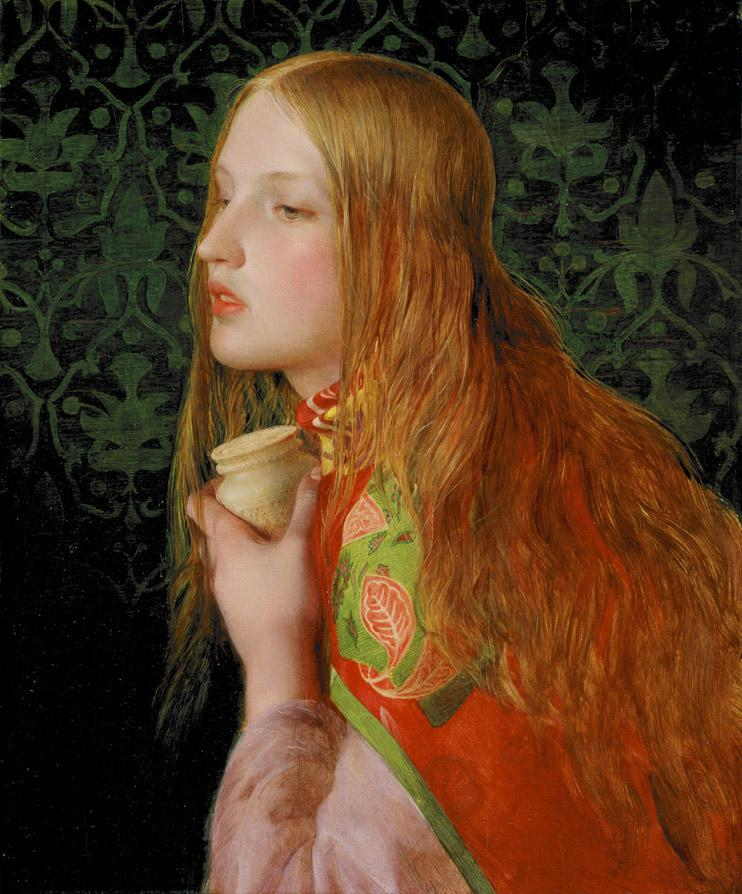
Mary Magdalene by Frederick Sandys, c. 1858–1860

The Delaware Art Museum is an art museum located on the Kentmere Parkway in Wilmington, Delaware, which holds a collection of more than 12,000 objects. The museum was founded in 1912 as the Wilmington Society of the Fine Arts in honor of the artist Howard Pyle. The collection focuses on American art and illustration from the 19th to the 21st century, and on the English Pre-Raphaelite Brotherhood movement of the mid-19th century.

The museum building was expanded and renovated in 2005 and includes a 9-acre (36,000 m^{2}) Sculpture Park, the Helen Farr Sloan Library and Archives, studio art classes, a children's learning area, as well as a cafe and museum store.

== History ==
The museum was founded in 1912 after Howard Pyle's death as the Wilmington Society of the Fine Arts (WSFA), with over 100 paintings, drawings, and prints purchased from Pyle's widow Anne. Pyle was the best-known American illustrator of his day; he died unexpectedly in 1911 while on a trip to Italy.

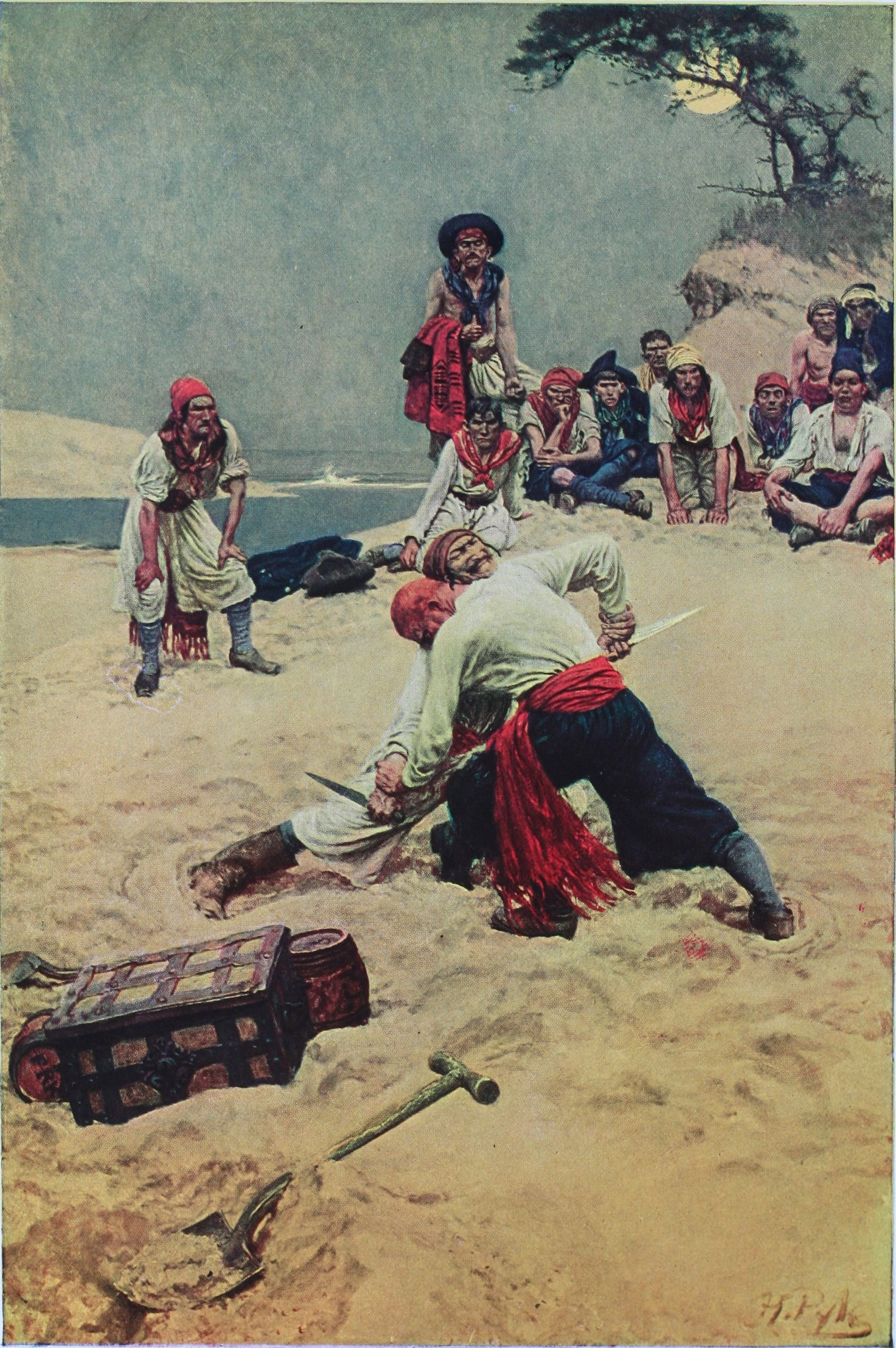
Who shall be captain? a 1911 painting by Howard Pyle at the museum

Pyle left behind many students and patrons in his home town of Wilmington who wished to honor his memory through the museum, including Frank Schoonover, Stanley Arthurs, and Louisa du Pont Copeland. The museum's charter stated its purpose "to promote the knowledge and enjoyment of and cultivation in the fine arts in the State of Delaware."

From 1912 to 1922, the WSFA did not have a permanent home. It held annual exhibitions at the Hotel duPont of work by Pyle, as well as juried exhibitions of his pupils and other Delaware artists. The Pyle Collection continued to grow due to the largess of Willard S. Morse, who gave over 100 Pyle pen and ink drawings to the WSFA between 1915 and 1919. In 1922, the WSFA rented three rooms in the New Library Building on the corner of 10th and Market Streets in downtown Wilmington.

In 2005, the DAM took out a $24.8 million loan in the form of tax-exempt bonds (to be repaid by 2037) in order to finance an ambitious $32.5 million doubling in size of its building. During the 2008 financial crisis, its endowment dropped from $33 million to $21 million. In response, the museum sold $30 million worth of art from its collection in order to repay its loans and increase its endowment, a move that brought sanctions from the Association of Art Museum Directors.

== Bancroft donation ==
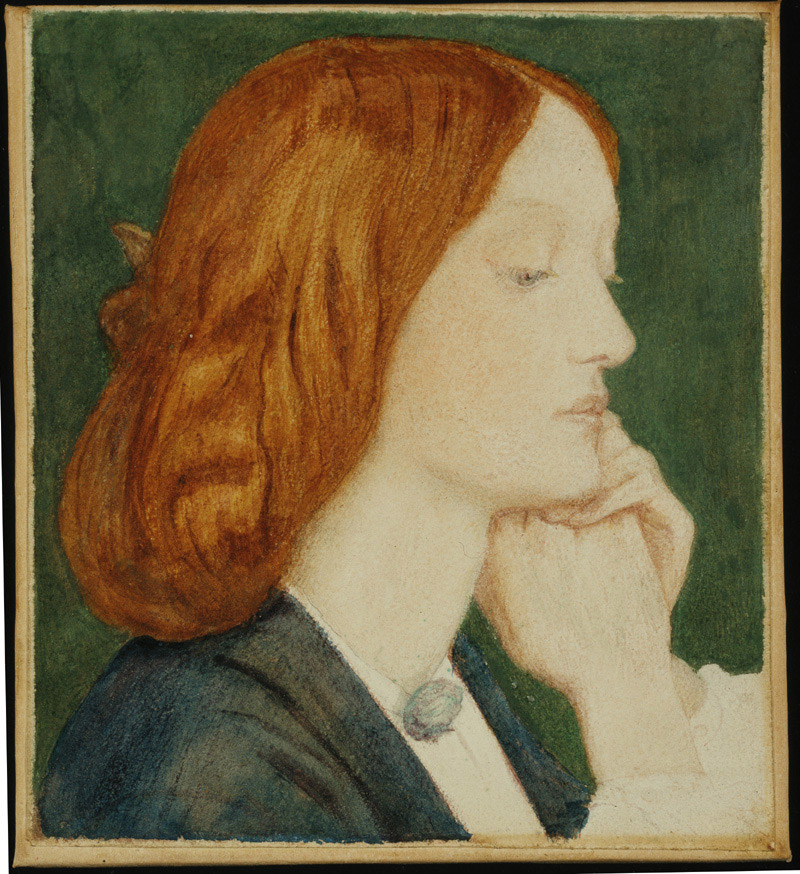
Portrait of Elizabeth Siddal by Pre-Raphaelite Dante Gabriel Rossetti, c. 1854

In 1931, the estate of Samuel Bancroft contacted the WSFA with an offer to donate a collection of Pre-Raphaelite works, along with 11 acres of land to house a museum for the collection. Bancroft acquired the collection beginning in the 1890s and it is the "largest and most important collection of British Pre-Raphaelite art and manuscript materials in the United States." Despite the hardships of the Great Depression, the WSFA raised $350,000 for the new building which opened in 1938. At the same time, the name was changed to Delaware Art Center. The new building was designed by architects Victorine & Samuel Homsey and associate architect G. Morris Whiteside II.

== Expansion ==
The WSFA moved into the Delaware Art Center in June 1938, with the Wilmington Academy of Fine Arts running educational programs on the ground floor. The onset of World War II resulted in strict gas rationing, which drastically reduced the attendance to the museum. The Wilmington Academy of Fine Arts disbanded in 1943 and turned its assets over to the Delaware Art Center, forming the basis of its education department, which grew to more than 500 students by 1954.

The rapid growth of educational programs after World War II required the Delaware Art Center to expand by 1956. Studios and training facilities were included in the expansion, thanks to a $300,000 donation by H. Fletcher Brown. A further renovation was completed in 1970, adding air conditioning and humidity control to the building. In 1972, the Delaware Art Center was awarded accreditation by the American Alliance of Museums. Shortly thereafter, the Delaware Art Center was renamed the Delaware Art Museum to "reflect the growing strength of its collections, programs, and constituency."

A further expansion was completed in 1987 which effectively doubled the size of the museum. However, the rapid growth of attendance, programming, and outreach required a further expansion in 2005. During the expansion, the museum hosted programming at what is now the Chase Center on the Riverfront.

== Collections ==
The Delaware Art Museum's collections are predominantly drawn from late 19th- and early 20th-century American illustration, as well as works from the Pre-Raphaelite Brotherhood. The basis of the museum's collections are the works of Howard Pyle and his pupils N.C. Wyeth, Frank Schoonover, and Stanley Arthurs. Helen Farr Sloan was the wife of artist John French Sloan, and she began donations in 1961 that eventually totalled 5,000 objects.

Since the 1970s, the museum has added works by modern artists such as Jacob Lawrence, Louise Nevelson, Robert Motherwell, George Segal, and Jim Dine. The permanent collections at the museum include the following:

=== Pre-Raphaelite Collection ===
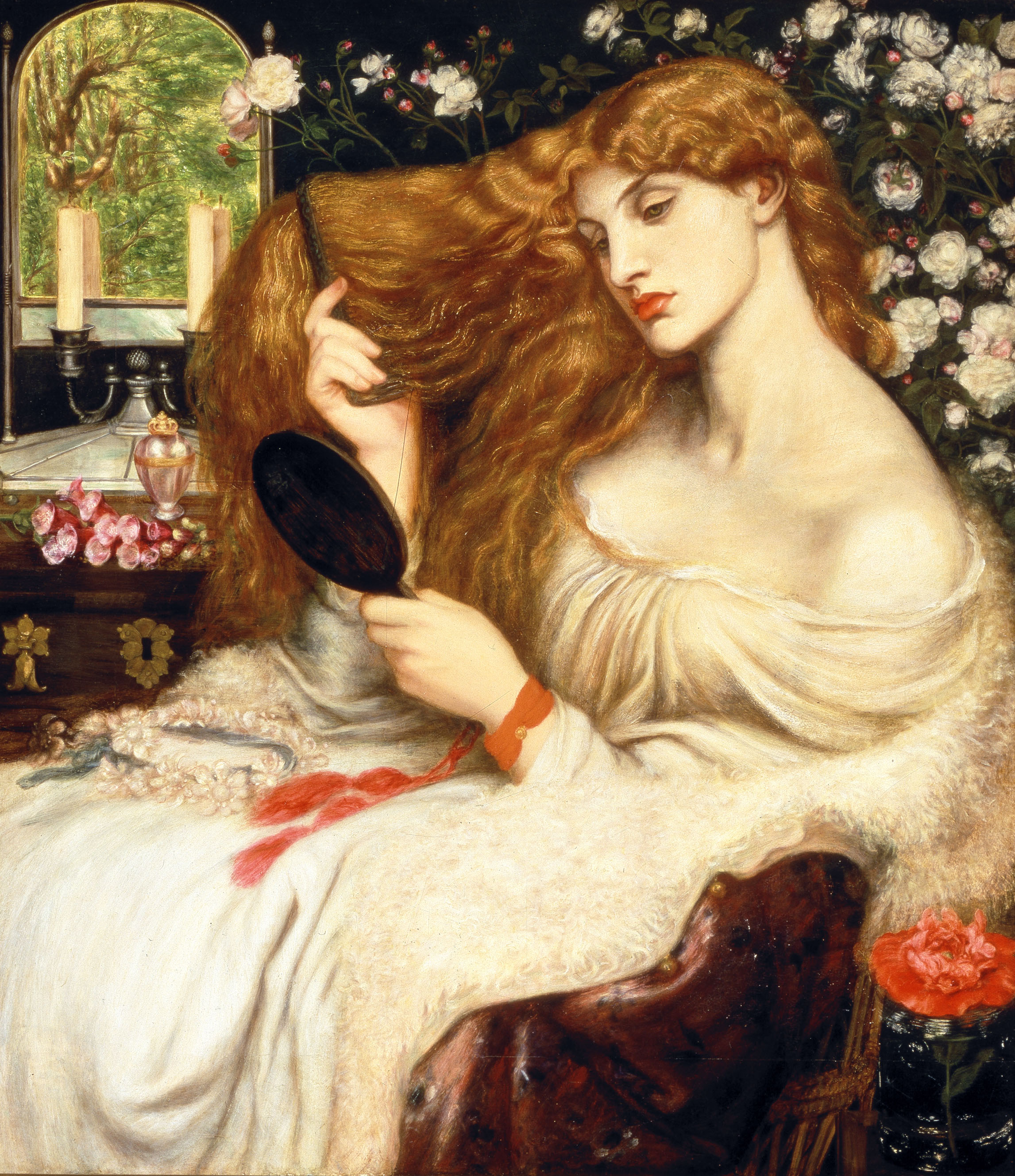
Lady Lilith, completed 1873, by Dante Gabriel Rossetti

- The Samuel and Mary R. Bancroft Pre-Raphaelite Collection, including works by:
  - Ford Madox Brown
  - Edward Burne-Jones
  - Julia Margaret Cameron
  - Walter Crane
  - Kate Greenaway
  - William Holman Hunt
  - John Everett Millais
  - Albert Joseph Moore
  - William Morris
  - Dante Gabriel Rossetti
  - Frederick Sandys
  - Elizabeth Siddal
  - Simeon Solomon
  - Marie Spartali Stillman
  - George Frederic Watts

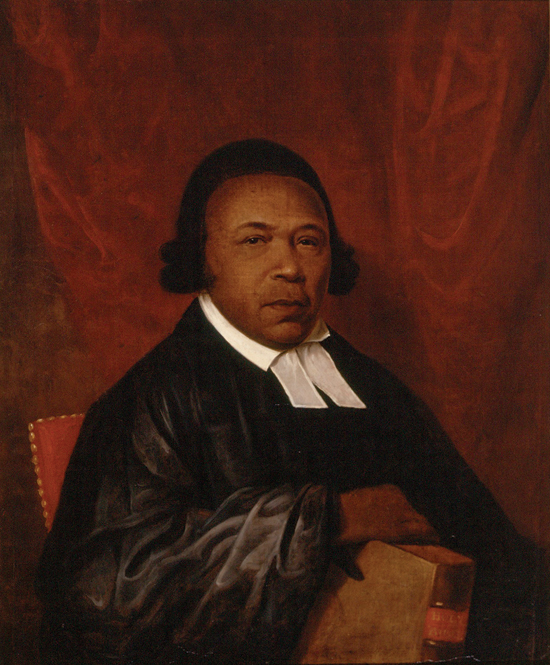
Portrait of Absalom Jones, 1810, by Raphaelle Peale

=== 19th Century American art ===
- American Art of the 19th Century, including works by:
  - Jefferson David Chalfant
  - Frederic Edwin Church
  - Thomas Dewing
  - Winslow Homer
  - George Inness
  - Raphaelle Peale
  - Severin Roesen
  - Augustus Saint-Gaudens
  - John Henry Twachtman

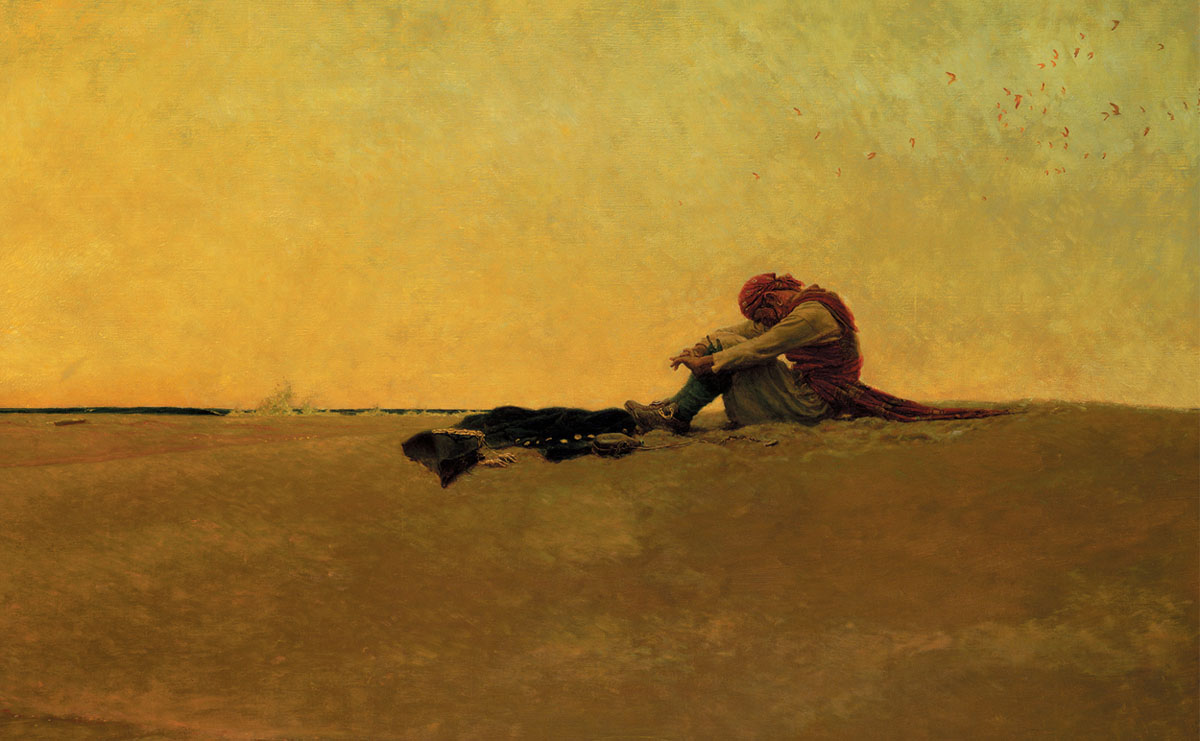
Marooned, 1909, by Howard Pyle

=== American illustration ===
==== Howard Pyle and his students ====
- From the "Golden Age of Illustration":
  - Howard Pyle
  - Frank Schoonover
  - N.C. Wyeth

==== Other American illustration ====
- Including works by:
  - Charles Dana Gibson
  - Elizabeth Shippen Green
  - John Held, Jr.
  - J. C. Leyendecker
  - Thomas Nast
  - Coles Phillips

=== American art of the early 20th Century ===
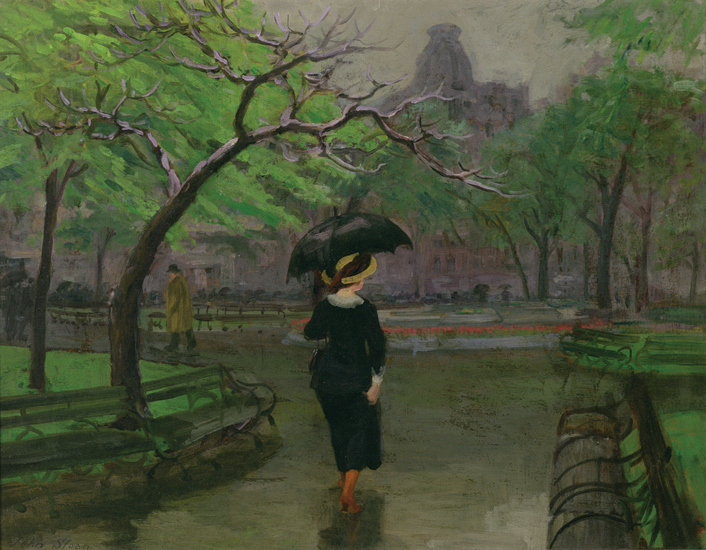
Spring Rain, 1912, by John Sloan

- Ashcan School (The Eight), including works by:
  - John Sloan
  - Robert Henri
  - George Luks
- Other artists, including works by:
  - Charles E. Burchfield
  - Lydia Field Emmet
  - John D. Graham
  - Marsden Hartley
  - Edward Hopper
  - Jacob Lawrence
  - Paul Manship
  - Reginald Marsh
  - William Zorach

=== Post-World War II American art ===
- Including works by:
  - Deborah Butterfield
  - Grace Hartigan
  - Al Held
  - Robert Indiana
  - Edward L. Loper, Sr.
  - David Lund
  - Louise Nevelson
  - Mark Tobey
  - Andrew Wyeth

== Helen Farr Sloan Library ==
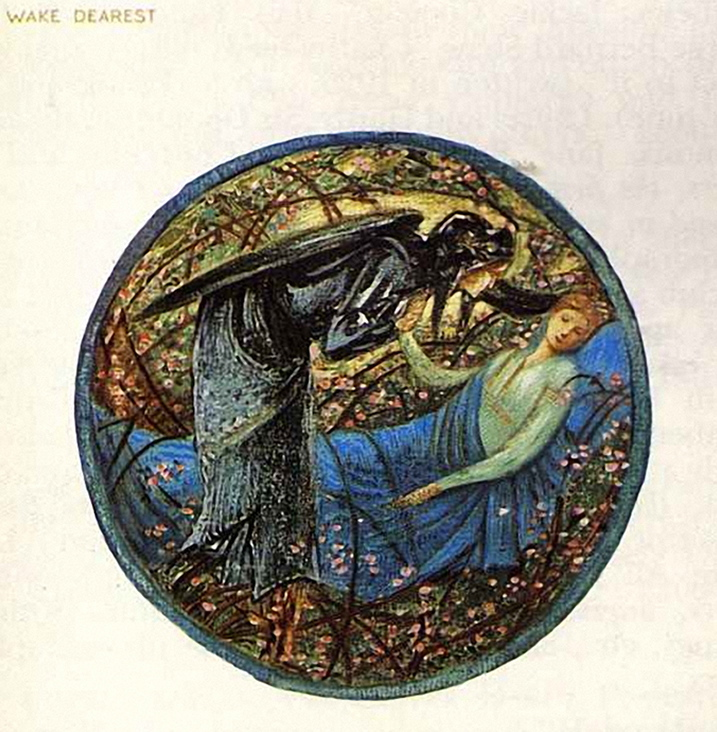
"Wake Dearest" from The Flower Book by Edward Burne-Jones

Two separate libraries opened in the new Delaware Art Center building in 1938: one centered on the collection of Howard Pyle, and the other on Samuel Bancroft, Jr.'s collections of Victorian books and works on Pre-Raphaelite painting. In 1978, Helen Farr Sloan donated the collections of her husband, the John Sloan Manuscript and Library Collection. A consolidated library opened in 1985 in the new Pamela and Lammot du Pont Copeland wing and was named in honor of Mrs. Sloan. It contains over 30,000 volumes and 1,000 boxes of personal papers, photographs and other material related to John Sloan, Samuel Bancroft, Jr. and Howard Pyle and his students. In 2009, the museum received the M.G. Sawyer Collection of Decorative Bindings, which contains over 2,000 volumes. In 2012, the library acquired a copy of The Flower Book by Edward Burne-Jones.

== Copeland Sculpture Garden ==
External videos
- Three Rectangles Horizontal Jointed Gyratory III
- Kinetic sculpture at the Delaware Art Museum (1:03), Delaware Art Museum

The nine acre sculpture garden behind the museum includes nine large sculptures and an old reservoir converted into a labyrinth.

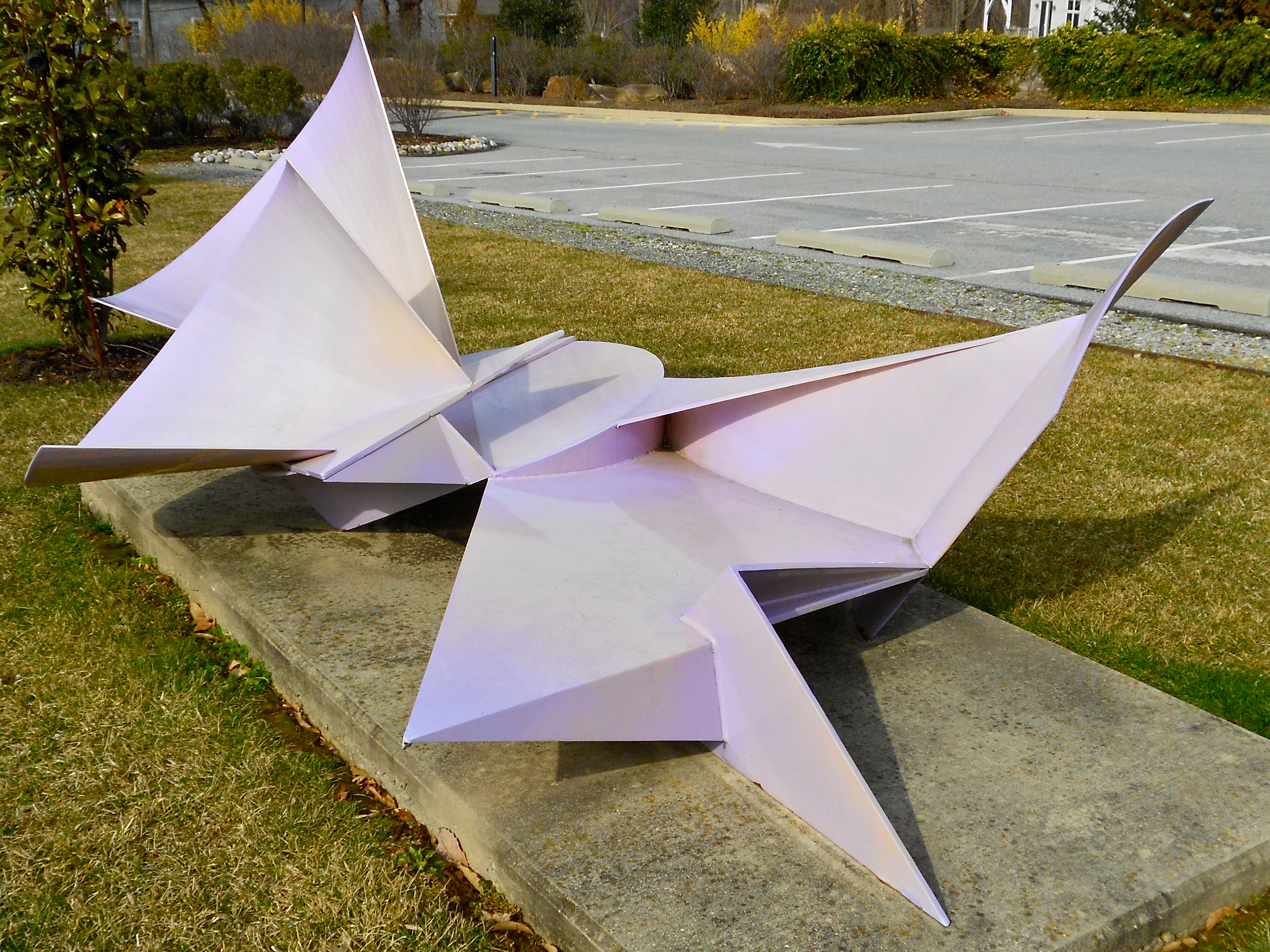
Wild Iris, 1974, by Isaac Witkin

Highlights include the 13-foot-tall bronze Crying Giant by Tom Otterness and Three Rectangles Horizontal Jointed Gyratory III by George Rickey, which moves in the wind. Joe Moss is represented by a sound sculpture which modifies and distorts nearby sounds.

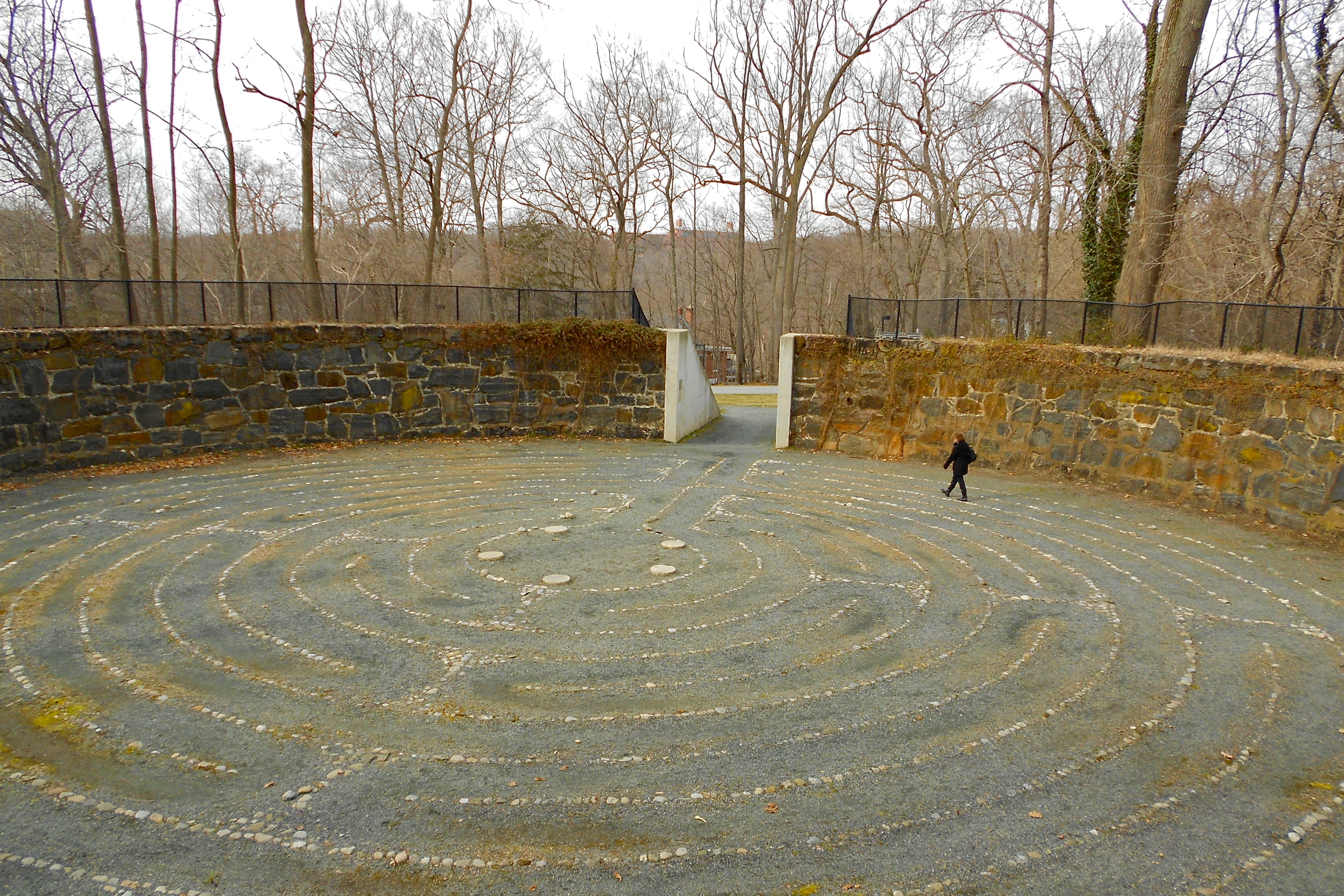
Labyrinth

== Exhibitions ==
The museum presents about ten special exhibitions each year with topics ranging from nationally known modern artists to historical Delaware folk art. Since 2009 the exhibitions have included the works of Leonard Baskin, Delaware photographer Fred Comegys, Harold Eugene Edgerton, James Gurney, May Morris, Maxfield Parrish, Ellen Bernard Thompson Pyle, Frank Schoonover, and John Sloan, as well as works from the collection of the Royal Holloway, University of London, and African American Art from the American Folk Art Museum.

Exhibitions have also included the works of Mary Page Evans, Howard Pyle, Katharine Pyle, and Katharine Richardson Wireman, as well as The Flower Book by Edward Burne-Jones.

== Studio art education ==
The museum offers about 100 programs each year, ranging from 8-week classes to 1-day workshops, as well as open studios. Special classes are offered to adults, teenagers, and children in areas including drawing, painting, photography, jewelry making, and ceramics.

== See also ==
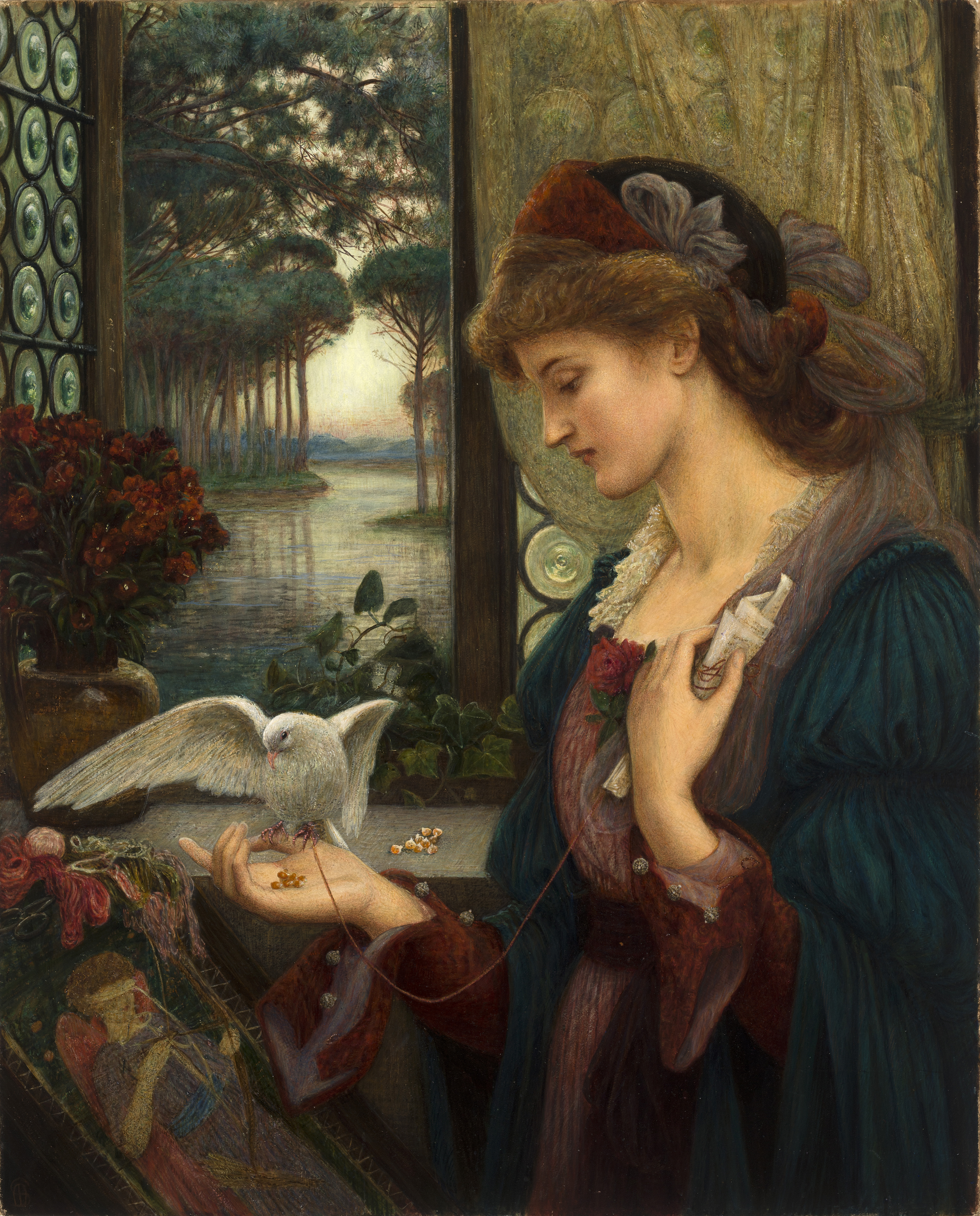
Love's Messenger, 1885, by Marie Spartali Stillman

- List of museums in Delaware
- Delaware Center for the Contemporary Arts
- Paul R. Jones Collection of African American Art

=== Artworks ===
- The Waterfall, John Everett Millais, 1853
- Mary Magdalene, Frederick Sandys, 1858–1860
- Lady Lilith, Dante Gabriel Rossetti, 1866–1868
- Veronica Veronese, Dante Gabriel Rossetti, 1872
- Mnemosyne, Dante Gabriel Rossetti, 1875/6–1881
- Found, Dante Gabriel Rossetti, 1882
- Love's Messenger, Marie Spartali Stillman, 1885
