= The Flower Book (Edward Burne-Jones) =

Series of watercolour paintings

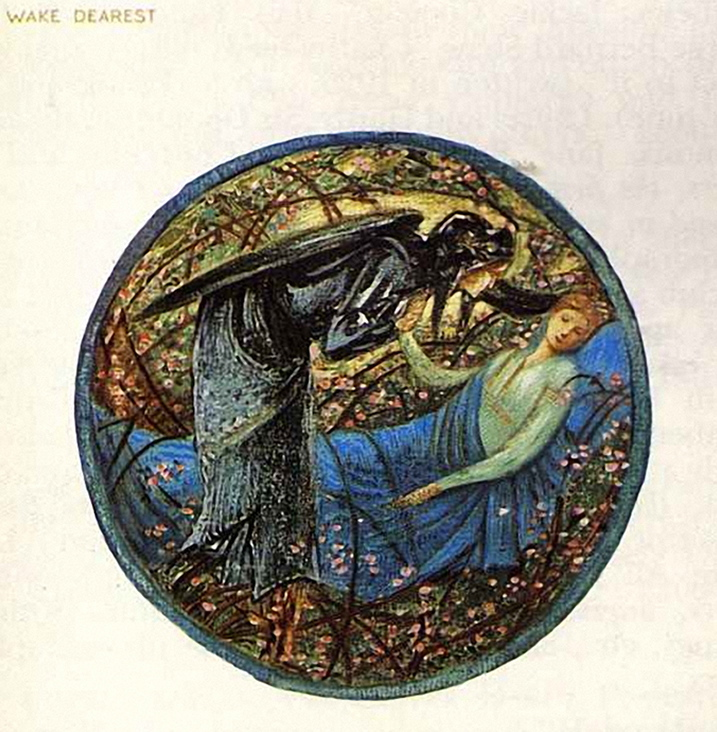
Wake Dearest, from the printed facsimiles

The Flower Book by the English artist Edward Burne-Jones (1833–1898) is a series of 38 round watercolours, each about six inches (15 centimetres) across, painted from 1882 to 1898. The paintings do not depict flowers; rather, they were inspired by the flowers' names. Burne-Jones called them "a series of illustrations to the Names of Flowers". "Not a single flower itself appears", according to his wife Georgiana. They were painted for his private pleasure, many while he was resting at his summer home in Rottingdean, and were described by his wife as the "most soothing piece of work that he ever did". In 1905 Georgiana, by then a widow, published a limited edition of high-quality colour facsimiles.

== Themes and technique ==
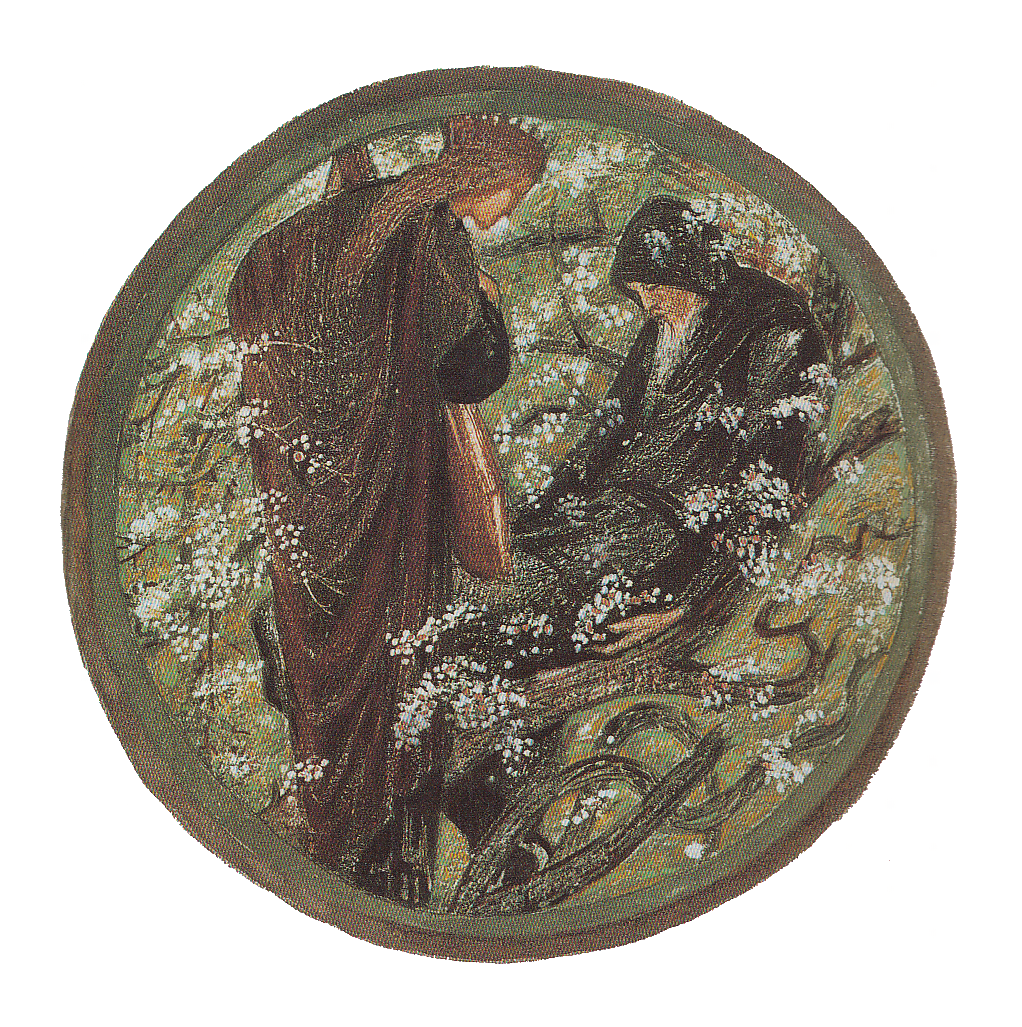
Witches' Tree, from the printed facsimiles

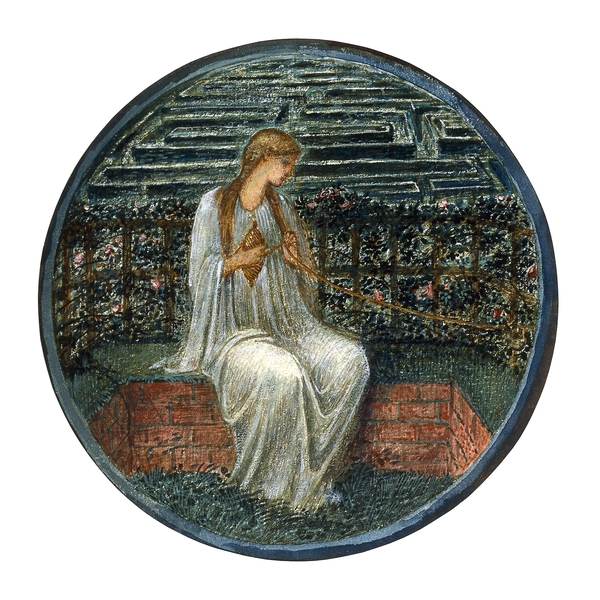
Love in a Tangle, from the watercolour in the British Museum

Worked in watercolours, bodycolour (or gouache), and gold paint, the paintings reflect the landscape around Rottingdean and include favourite themes from Burne-Jones's work: Witches' Tree (no. xv) revisits the subject of The Beguiling of Merlin and Meadow Sweet (no. xxxv) features the central figures from The Last Sleep of Arthur in Avalon.

Burne-Jones collected folknames of flowers from many sources, but the greatest number were provided by Eleanor Leighton, Lady Leighton Warren, who shared her "knowledge of the names and legends belonging to flowers". In a letter to her, he wrote:

Pray send me as many names as ever you can, for alack it is not one in ten that I can use. Of course I could make pictures to all, but I want the name and the picture to be one soul together, and indissoluble, as if they could not exist apart; so many lovely names and nothing to be done with them.

In a later letter, he added, "You see how I want to deal with them: it is not enough to illustrate them—that is such poor work: I want to add to them or wring their secret from them."

== Publication ==
On his death, Burne-Jones left the album of flower paintings to his wife Georgiana, and she published a facsimile edition of 300 copies in 1905 in co-operation with the Fine Art Society in London. It was printed by Henri Piazza, who hand-stencilled watercolour over collotypes using the pochoir technique to produce brilliant colours. These copies of the "Book" were sold in both bound and unbound form, with the unbound copies contained in a clamshell box.

Copies of The Flower Book are in the collections of the Birmingham Museums and Art Gallery and the Delaware Art Museum. The art publisher Taschen reprinted the book in 1994 in a modern format without using the pochoir technique.

The British Museum bought the original album of paintings from Georgiana Burne-Jones in 1909.

=== Prints ===
For the complete set of prints see The Flower Book by Edward Burne-Jones on Wikimedia Commons.

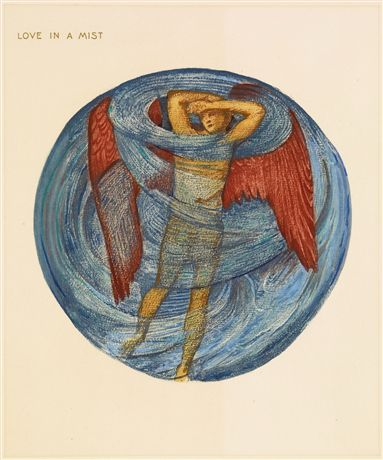
No. i
Love in a Mist
Nigella damascena

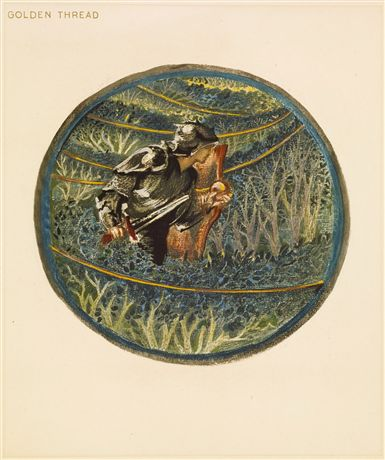
No. ii
Golden Thread
Coptis trifolia groenlandica

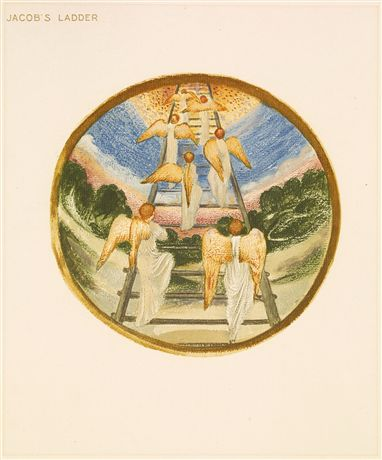
No. iii
Jacob's Ladder
Polemonium caeruleum

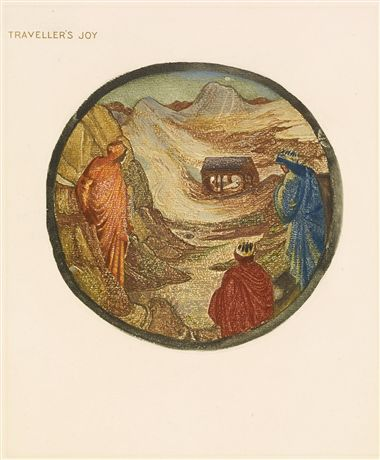
No. iv
Traveller's Joy
Clematis vitalba

== See also ==
- List of paintings by Edward Burne-Jones

== Notes ==
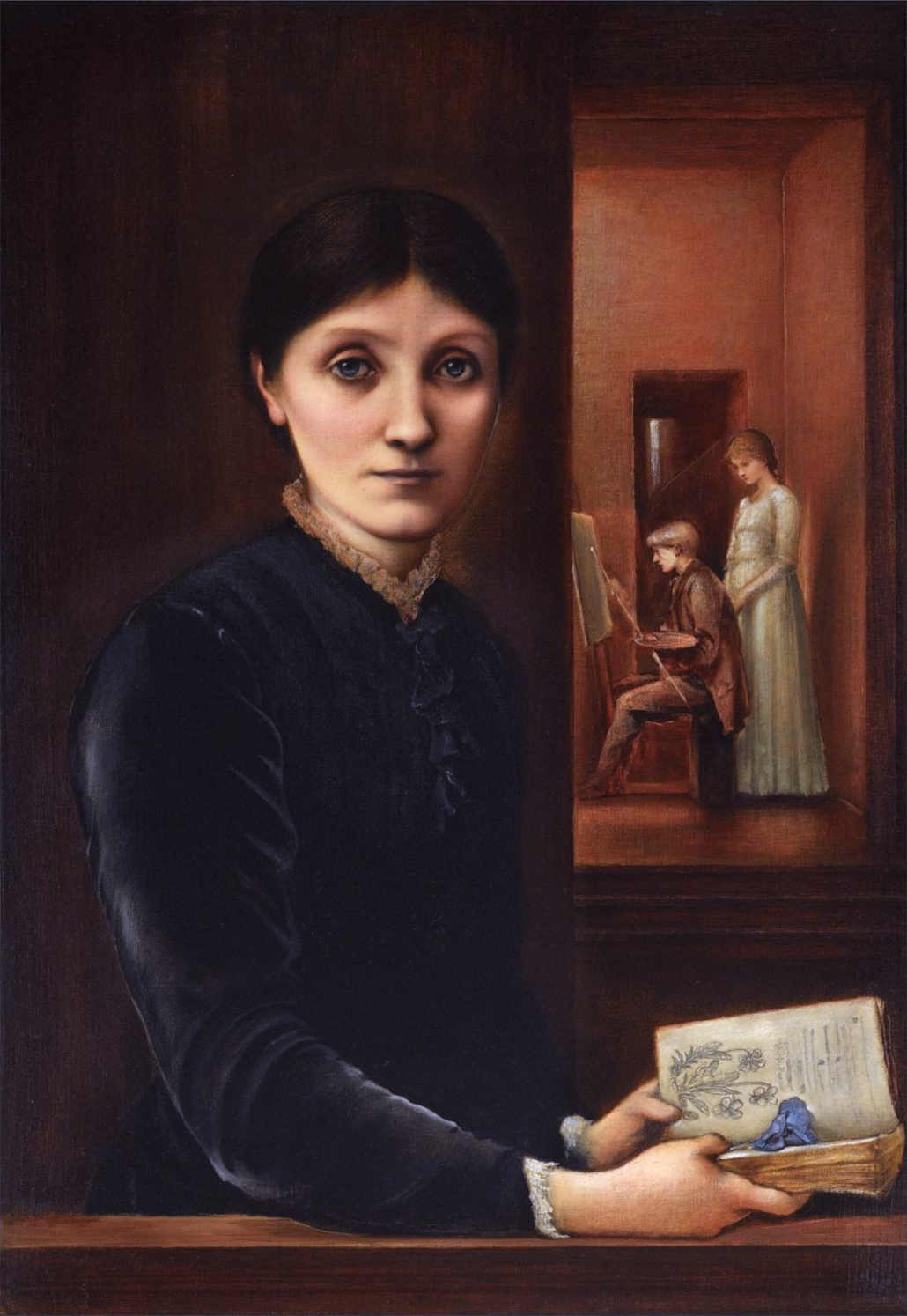
Portrait of Georgiana Burne-Jones by Edward Burne-Jones, 1883, showing her holding a different book of flowers.
