= John Sloane =

John Sloane may refer to:

- John Sloane (Ohio politician) (1779–1856), U.S. representative and Treasurer of the United States
- John Eyre Sloane (1886–1970), American industrialist
- John L. Sloane (1847–1897), mayor of Missoula, Montana.

== See also ==
- Jonathan Sloane (1785–1854), U.S. Representative from Ohio
- John Sloan (disambiguation)
