= Catherine Aird =

English novelist (1930–2024)

Catherine Aird MBE
- Born: Kinn Hamilton McIntosh; 20 June 1930; Huddersfield, Yorkshire, England
- Died: 21 December 2024 (aged 94); Sturry, Kent, England
- Occupations: Novelist; short story writer
- Writing career
- Genres: Murder mystery; detective story; crime fiction

Kinn Hamilton McIntosh MBE (20 June 1930 – 21 December 2024), known professionally as Catherine Aird, was an English novelist. She was the author of more than twenty crime fiction novels and several collections of short stories. Her witty, literate, and deftly plotted novels straddle the "cozy", "traditional" and "police procedural" genres and are somewhat similar in flavour to those of Martha Grimes, Caroline Graham, M. C. Beaton, Margaret Yorke, and Pauline Bell. Aird was inducted into the prestigious Detection Club in 1981, and is a recipient of the 2015 Cartier Diamond Dagger award.

== Life and career ==
Aird was born in Huddersfield, West Riding of Yorkshire in England, the daughter of Dr and Mrs R.A.C. McIntosh. She attended the Waverley School and Greenhead High School, both in Huddersfield. As a young adult, she was bedridden due to a serious illness. Upon recovery, she gave up her plans to study medicine at Edinburgh University, instead working as practice manager and dispenser for her father's medical practice in Sturry, near Canterbury, Kent, giving her a familiarity with drugs and poison she put to use in her crime fiction.

Her first novel, The Religious Body, was published in 1966. Aird was best known for her successful Chronicles of Calleshire, a series of crime novels set in the fictional county of Calleshire, England, and featuring Detective Inspector C.D. Sloan of the Berebury CID, and his assistant, Detective Constable Crosby. She also wrote and edited a series of village histories, and was an editor and contributing author on works regarding other writers and the art of writing.

Aird served as chair of the Crime Writers' Association from 1990 through 1991. She was awarded the CWA Golden Handcuffs award for lifetime achievement and the Diamond Dagger for an outstanding lifetime's contribution to the genre, in 2015.

In the 1988 Birthday Honours, she was appointed a Member of the Order of the British Empire (MBE) for services to the Girl Guides Association, for which she served as chairman of the Guides’ U.K. Finance Committee, and then assistant treasurer of the World Association of Girl Guides and Girl Scouts. She was awarded an honorary MA from the University of Kent in 1985. She lived since the war in Sturry, a village in East Kent, where she took an active interest in local affairs, serving on the Parish Council for several years.

== Death ==
Aird died at her home in Sturry on 21 December 2024 at the age of 94. She was buried in Sturry Cemetery.

== Bibliography ==
=== Novels ===
- The Religious Body (1966) ISBN 978-1601870124
- A Most Contagious Game (1967) ISBN 978-1601870025
- Henrietta Who (1968) ISBN 978-9997502155
- The Complete Steel (1969) [The Stately Home Murder] ISBN 9780006132929
- A Late Phoenix (1970) ISBN 978-0002314589
- His Burial Too (1973) ISBN 978-1601870384
- Slight Mourning (1975) ISBN 978-1601870513
- Parting Breath (1977) ISBN 978-0002316163
- Some Die Eloquent (1979) ISBN 978-1982632915
- Passing Strange (1980) ISBN 978-0002316583
- Last Respects (1982) ISBN 978-0385182560
- Harm's Way (1984) ISBN 978-0385195423
- A Dead Liberty (1986) ISBN 978-0385235549
- The Body Politic (1990) ISBN 978-0385417808
- A Going Concern (1993) ISBN 978-0312114237
- After Effects (1996) ISBN 978-0312142704
- Stiff News (1998) ISBN 9780333736524
- Little Knell (2001) ISBN 978-0312269838
- Amendment of Life (2002) ISBN 978-0333907634
- A Hole in One (2005) ISBN 978-0749082925
- Losing Ground (2007) ISBN 9780749080501
- Past Tense (2010) ISBN 978-0312672911
- Dead Heading (2014) ISBN 978-0749014575
- Learning Curve (2016) ISBN 978-0749020194
- Inheritance Tracks (2019) ISBN 978-0749024260
- Constable Country (2023) ISBN 978-0749030759

=== Collections ===
- The Catherine Aird Collection (1993) ISBN 978-0330326452
- The Second Catherine Aird Collection (1994) ISBN 978-0330338400
- The Third Catherine Aird Collection (1997) ISBN 978-0330352413
- Injury Time (short stories, 1994) ISBN 978-0333625897
- Chapter and Hearse (short stories, 2003) ISBN 978-0312290849
- Last Writes (short stories, 2014) ISBN 978-0749016272

=== Short stories ===
- "Grave Import" (1996) ISBN 0727851322
- "Like To Die" (1997)
- "Handsel Monday" in Past Poisons (1998) ISBN 0747275017
- "The Man Who Rowed for the Shore" (1998) ISBN 0195086031
- "Gold Frankincense and Murder" (2000)
- "Cold Comfort" (2001) ISBN 0747266174

=== Non-fiction ===
- The Oxford Companion to Crime and Mystery Writing (1999) ISBN 0195072391
- Mystery Voices: Interviews with British Crime Writers (1991) ISBN 0893702781
- Howdunit: A Masterclass in Crime Writing by Members of the Detection Club (2020) ISBN 978-0008380137

== See also ==
- Sloan and Crosby
