= Mary Magdalene (Sandys) =

Painting by Frederick Sandys

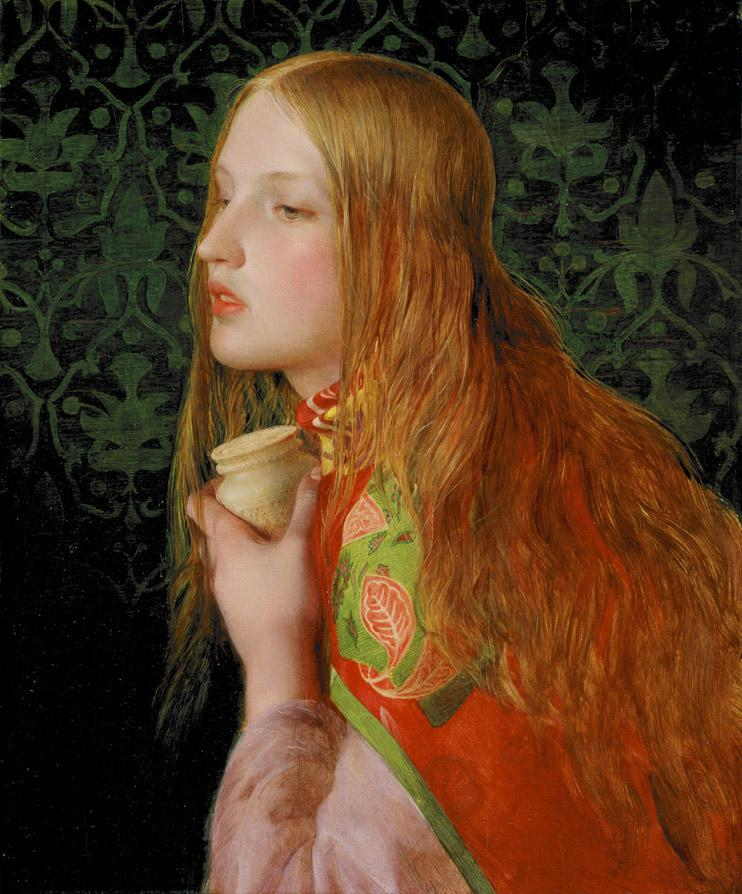
- Artist: Frederick Sandys
- Year: ca. 1858–1860
- Type: Oil on panel
- Dimensions: 33.5 cm × 28 cm (13 1/4 in × 11 in)
- Location: Delaware Art Museum; Wilmington, Delaware

Mary Magdalene is a Pre-Raphaelite oil-on-panel painting by the British artist Frederick Sandys, executed in 1858–1860. Mary Magdalene was the only figure from the Bible that Sandys ever painted. Having sharp features reminiscent of Lizzie Siddal (though the model is unknown), Mary is depicted in front of a patterned forest-green damask. She holds an alabaster ointment cup, a traditional attribute which associates her with the unnamed sinful woman who anointed Jesus' feet in Luke 7:37. Like other Pre-Raphaelite painters, Frederick Sandys gave Magdalene a sensual look.

Dante Rossetti accused Sandys of plagiarism, because of the resemblance to his Mary Magdalene Leaving the House of Feasting, but when Rossetti came to paint Magdalene some twenty years later, it was his painting that resembled Sandys.

Mary Magdalene was acquired in 1894 by Samuel Bancroft, the most important American collector of Pre-Raphaelite art, whose family donated his collection to the Delaware Art Museum in 1935. Bancroft had bought the painting from Charles Fairfax Murray, an artist in the Pre-Raphaelite circle.

It has been exhibited as part of a touring exhibition of the Bancroft Collection, at the Saint Louis Art Museum, San Diego Museum of Art, the Frick Art & Historical Center in Pittsburgh, Nottingham Castle, and other locations. It was once featured in an oversize advertisement in the San Antonio International Airport.

== See also ==
- List of Pre-Raphaelite paintings
