= Sloan Creek =

Sloan Creek may refer to:

- Sloan Creek (Missouri), a stream in Cape Girardeau County
- Sloan Creek (Washington), a tributary of the North Fork Sauk River
