= Sloan Site =

- Location in Arkansas
- 36°06′57″N 90°52′28″W
- Type: Cemetery
- Cultures: Dalton
- Location: Greene County, Arkansas, US
- Region: Northeast Arkansas

History
- Built: 12,480 BCE
- Abandoned: 11,300 BCE

Site notes
- Owner: The Archaeological Conservancy
- Management: Arkansas Archeological Survey
- Public access: No
- Responsible body: State

The Sloan Site is an archaeological site near Crowley’s Ridge in Arkansas which is recognized for being among the oldest documented cemeteries in the New World.

== Location ==
The cemetery site is located on a late Ice Age sand dune in Greene County, Arkansas between Crowley's Ridge and the Ozarks. The exact location is not available to prevent degradation of the site from visitors due to past vandalism.

== Discovery ==
The excavation site measured 12 meters by 12 meters and contained Paleo-Indian Dalton graves with bone fragments and artifacts. The bone fragments date between 12,480 and 11,300 years ago. Mary Ann Sloan, a student at nearby Arkansas State University in Jonesboro, Arkansas first recorded the site in June 1968 for an archeology course. Frank Sloan reported the information to Dr. Dan Morse, the station archaeologist for the Arkansas Archeological Survey base at ASU in 1974, after he discovered locals were scavenging and selling artefacts from the site. The site was excavated by Dr. Morse in March 1974 despite adverse weather conditions, and field results were published in 1997.
