= Ramsey Branch =

Stream in the American state of Missouri

Coordinates: 37°14′52″N 89°33′12″W

Ramsey Branch is a stream in Cape Girardeau County, Missouri, in the United States. It is a tributary to the Castor River.

Ramsey Branch was named for Andrew Ramsay, an early settler.

== See also ==
- List of rivers of Missouri
