= Słone =

Słone (meaning "salty") may refer to the following places in Poland:

- Słone, Lower Silesian Voivodeship (south-west Poland)
- Słone, Kuyavian-Pomeranian Voivodeship (north-central Poland)
- Słone, Lubusz Voivodeship (west Poland)
- Słone (Kudowa-Zdrój), Silesia
