= Anna Bogenholm Sloane =

American artist

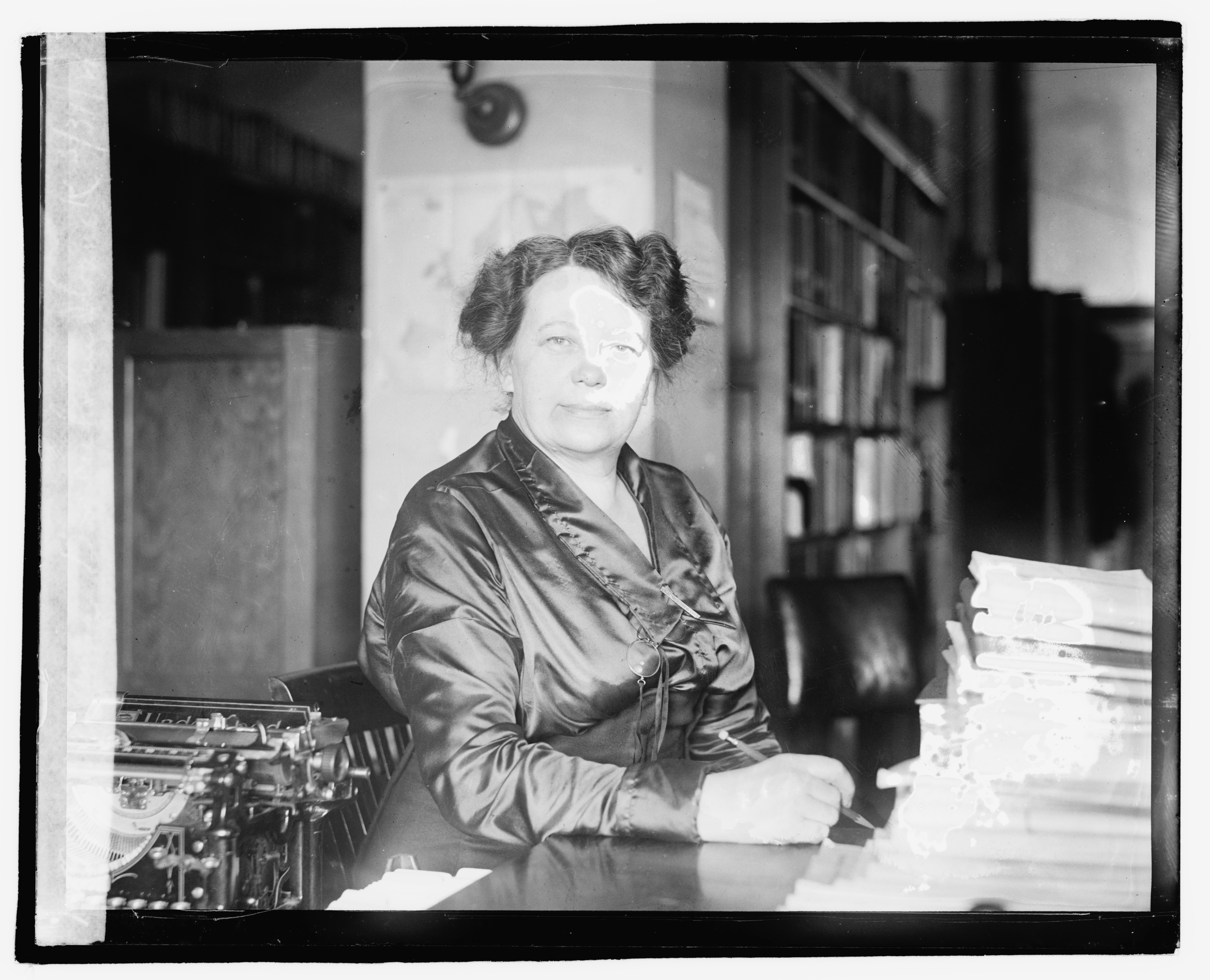
- Born: April 15, 1867; Råggärd
- Died: February 1, 1940 (aged 72); Manhattan
- Occupation: Artist

Anna Bogenholm Sloane (April 15, 1867 – February 1, 1940) was a Swedish-American handicrafts artist, educational author, mystic, and Nazi sympathizer.

Anna Bogenholm Sloane was born on April 15, 1867 in Råggärd, Sweden. She attended the Technical College of Kristinehamn and Nass Teachers' College. In 1894, she moved to the United States and began a handicrafts school in Chicago.

In 1899, she married Mersene E. Sloan.^1 When Mersene Sloan secured a job at the US Census Bureau, they moved to Washington, D.C., where she began another handicrafts school. They had two children, Roy Herbert (b. 1907) and Norma. She would later write that he was "a tyrant of mind if ever one lived, a religious fanatic who counted his will as paramount to the simplest desires of all others" and at one point he attempted to bring their children to China. They divorced in 1919.

Sloane published newspaper and magazine articles on a number of educational and vocational topics and wrote several books for children. She earned a bachelor's degree from George Washington University in 1921, and then a master's degree. Her thesis was International exchange of goods and cooperative associations of Europe as markets for United States exports. She would later study for a PhD at Columbia University. She worked for the US government in a variety of capacities as a researcher, including taking a trip to Scandinavia in 1923 to research immigration issues.

In 1927, she spent two years in India and became a devotee of Sri Aurobindo Ghose. Her interest in Eastern religions, theosophy, and mysticism increased to the point that she was making outlandish claims about history and eternal life. Meanwhile, Mersene Sloan published a series of incendiary books opposed to theosophy and Eastern religions, including The Indian Menace (1929), where he wrote: "When American women by such delusion come under continued influence of a swami, they are easy victims to whatever suggestions may be proposed."

Her son Roy Sloane began committing petty crimes and was imprisoned for car theft as a teenager. A promising engineering student who took classes at the Carnegie Institute of Technology and Columbia University, he kept committing crimes. He made headlines by representing himself in court and getting convictions overturned, but between trips to court attempted an escape from Sing Sing prison. A few months after his release he was arrested for a robbery, and while out on bail for that crime, he was gunned down in front of a New York City speakeasy called the Mad Dot Boat Club in 1931.

In the late 1930s, Sloane was in communication with the Deutscher Fichte-Bund, offering advice on public figures in America who might be sympathetic to Nazism and planning a biography of Hitler. Her connection to the Bund was investigated by the House Un-American Activities Committee in 1939. That same year, adding 10 years to her age, she claimed she had mastered the "ancient aryan formula for rebuilding the body" which enabled her to grow a new set of teeth. She also claimed to have secured funding to publish an antisemitic newspaper, the National Patriot, which never appeared.

== Bibliography ==
- Our Little Lapp Cousins (1927)
- Strange Tales from Many Lands
- Stories About Animal Pets (1927)
- Stories from the Industrial World

== Notes ==
^{1} She seems to have consistently spelled Sloane with an 'e' while he published his later books under the name Sloan with no 'e'.
