= Sloane Gordon =

American journalist

Sloane Gordon (March 1, 1871 – May 7, 1926) was an American political writer. Gordon was born in Dayton, Ohio, and began his newspaper career in Middletown, Ohio. He worked a number of years for the Cincinnati Enquirer, and later moved to Washington, D.C. and then New York. During World War I he was stationed as a correspondent in the Russian Empire. He died in the Ozarks in Missouri on May 7, 1926, while on assignment. His New York Times obituary described him as a "widely known writer on politics."
