= Mount Sloan =

Mountain in British Columbia, Canada

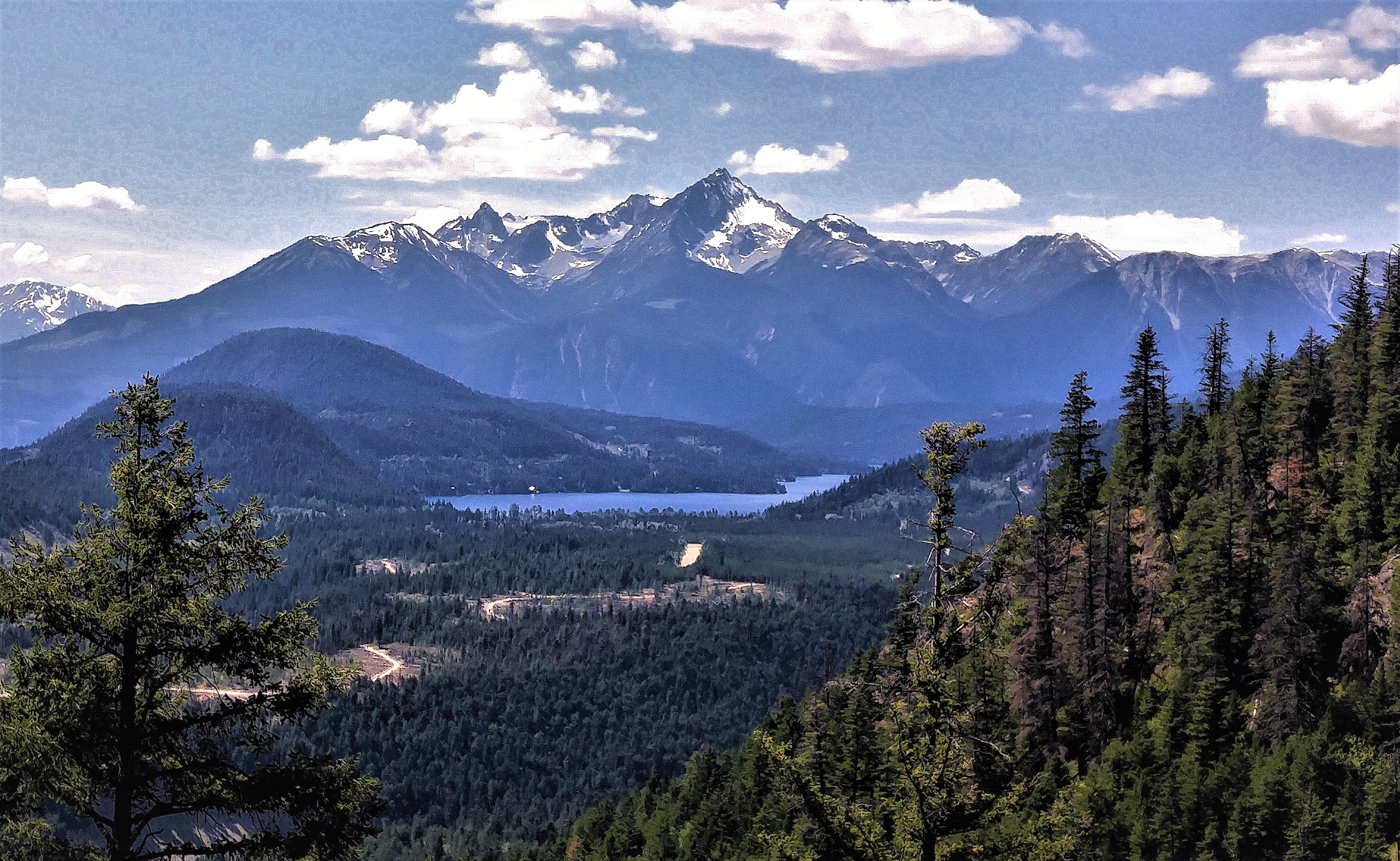
- Northeast aspect

Highest point
- Elevation: 2,720 m (8,924 ft)
- Prominence: 500 m (1,640 ft)
- Parent peak: Mount Vayu (2,794 m)
- Isolation: 11.75 km (7.30 mi)
- Listing: Mountains of British Columbia
- Coordinates: 50°46′55″N 122°58′18″W

Geography
- Location within British Columbia Location within Canada
- Interactive map of Mount Sloan
- Country: Canada
- Province: British Columbia
- District: Lillooet Land District
- Parent range: Thiassi Range; Coast Mountains
- Topo map: NTS 92J15 Bralorne

Climbing
- Easiest route: Scrambling (class 3)

Mount Sloan is a 2,720-metre (8,924-foot) mountain summit located in British Columbia, Canada.

== Description ==
Mount Sloan is the sixth-highest peak in the Thiassi Range which is a subrange of the Coast Mountains. The remote mountain is situated 50 km (31 mi) north of Pemberton and 11 km (7 mi) west of the historic gold-mining community of Bralorne. Precipitation runoff from the peak drains north to Downton Lake which is a reservoir of the Bridge River. Mount Sloan is more notable for its steep rise above local terrain than for its absolute elevation as topographic relief is significant with the summit rising over 1,960 meters (6,430 ft) above Downton Lake in 5 km (3.1 mi). Mount Penrose rises to the north on the opposite side of the lake.

== Etymology ==
The mountain was presumably named after David Sloan who was a mining engineer and managing director at the Pioneer Mine just east of Bralorne. He died on August 4, 1935, from injuries received in a floatplane crash at Alta Lake on July 30, 1935. The crash also took the lives of the pilot, William R. McCluskey, Reginald Walter Brock and his wife Mildred. The mountain's toponym was officially adopted September 6, 1951, by the Geographical Names Board of Canada.

== Climate ==
Based on the Köppen climate classification, Mount Sloan is located in a subarctic climate zone of western North America. Most weather fronts originate in the Pacific Ocean, and travel east toward the Coast Mountains where they are forced upward by the range (Orographic lift), causing them to drop their moisture in the form of rain or snowfall. As a result, the Coast Mountains experience high precipitation, especially during the winter months in the form of snowfall. Winter temperatures can drop below −20 °C with wind chill factors below −30 °C.

== See also ==
- Geography of British Columbia
