= Michael Sloane (disambiguation) =

Michael Sloane is an actor and writer.

Michael Sloane may also refer to:

- Michael Sloane, character in Frankenstein (2004 film)
- Mick Sloane, character in ReGenesis
