= Sloan and Crosby =

The Calleshire Chronicles, also known as the Sloan and Crosby canon, is a series of 24 crime novels by the English author Catherine Aird. The first, The Religious Body (ISBN 0-7451-5709-2), appeared in 1966 and the most recent, Constable Country (ISBN 9780749030759), in 2023.

The Sloan & Crosby series is not to be missed by lovers of a good mystery. The mysteries have a wonderful comic touch, intricate plotting and literate charm.

Christopher Dennis Sloan, known to his colleagues as "Seedy", is a long-suffering detective inspector. Happily married, he grows roses in his (limited) spare time. In each novel he is helped by the hapless Detective Constable William Crosby, a fast-driving but slow-thinking young man avoided by his colleagues: only Sloan's wife Margaret has ever been known to say a good word about him. In each novel Sloan is put under pressure by his immediate superior, the choleric Superintendent Leeyes. The laboured conversations between the two men summarise the plot at regular intervals. The only other three characters who appear regularly are: Dr Dabbe, the lugubrious pathologist; Dyson, the caption-loving police photographer; and traffic division head Inspector "Happy" Harpe, so named because he claims he has never had anything to smile about.

The books, set in a county easily identifiable as Kent, often turn on ecclesiastical matters and show Aird's deep knowledge of canon law.
