= Helen Farr Sloan =

American painter

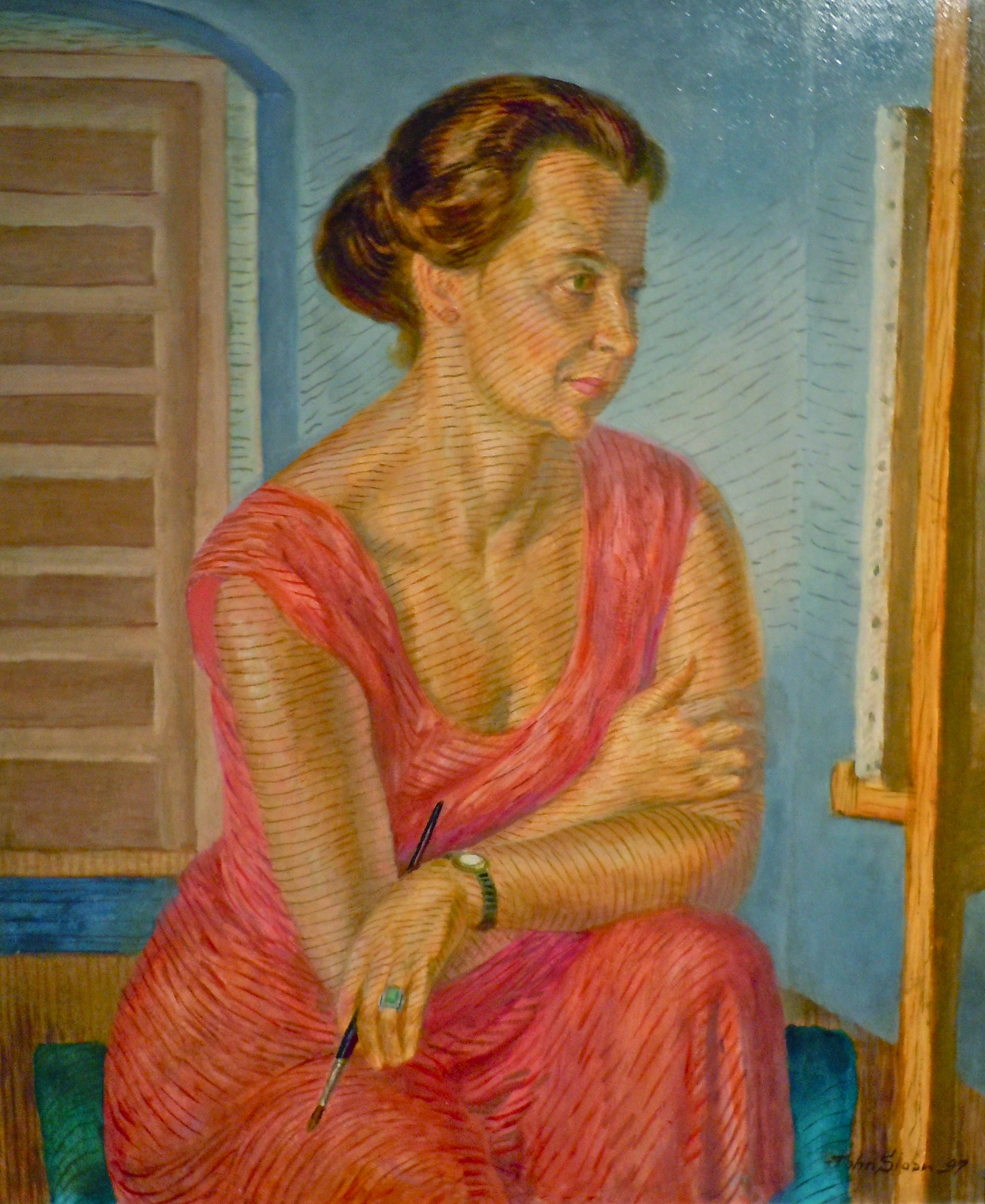
- Helen at the Easel, 1947 by John Sloan
- Born: Helen Farr; February 24, 1911; New York City, New York
- Died: December 13, 2005 (aged 94); Wilmington, Delaware
- Education: John Sloan
- Alma mater: Art Students League of New York
- Known for: Painting, philanthropy
- Style: Realistic, expressionistic
- Spouse: John Sloan

Helen Farr Sloan (24 February 1911 – 13 December 2005) was a patron of the arts, educator, accomplished artist, and the second wife of artist John Sloan.

For over fifty years, Helen Farr Sloan quietly created a remarkable profile as an American philanthropist. Following the 1951 death of her husband, John Sloan, one of the most famous American artists of the twentieth century, Helen organized the artist’s estate and turned it into a philanthropic instrument to serve local, regional, national, and international arts constituencies. She was particularly known for her support for women entering the fields of art history and museum studies.

== Biography ==
Farr was born in New York City. She was the daughter of Dr. Charles Farr, a New York surgeon, and Helen Woodhull Farr. She graduated high school from the prestigious Brearley School for girls in 1929. Her parents wanted her to attend Bryn Mawr College, but she knew that her interests lay in the arts and a less structured future. She took anatomy classes at Cornell University Medical College and studied weaving, pottery, metalwork, wood carving and jewelry making at the Craft Students League. At sixteen, Helen Farr enrolled in the Art Students League of New York, where she met and studied with John Sloan (1871–1951), who became her lifelong friend and mentor. In the 1930s Helen spent several summers in New Mexico with the Sloans, where she was an active member of the Santa Fe art colony. In 1944, while Helen Farr was workings as head of the art department at the Nightingale-Bamford School in New York City, Sloan's first wife, Dolly, died, leaving him a widower at age 74. Later that year, Helen's former teacher, called her and invited her to join him in Santa Fe. Farr arrived in Santa Fe in the summer of 1945. They spent the summer collaborating on a book project and just before Farr was set to return to New York Sloan proposed and they were married by a justice of the peace.

While her marriage to Sloan lasted only seven years, from 1945 to his death in 1951, Helen Farr Sloan’s devotion to art was a lifelong commitment. After Sloan’s death, she helped to organize his well-received posthumous retrospective at the Whitney Museum of American Art and returned to her teaching career and to painting. She also spent her remaining years supporting research about her husband and American art history and working overseeing the distribution of his estate. The contents of his studio and his wide-ranging library became a treasure trove for philanthropic giving. The recipients of her largesse include the University of Delaware, Sewell C. Biggs Museum in Dover, Delaware, Smithsonian Institution, the National Gallery of Art, Boston Film and Video Foundation, Colorado Springs Fine Arts Center, Katonah Museum of Art in New York and the New-York Historical Society. Helen Farr Sloan’s own works are held in private and public collections, including the Philadelphia Museum of Art, the Asheville Art Museum, the Delaware Art Museum, The British Museum, and the National Museum of Women in the Arts in Washington, D.C.

Beginning in 1961, and continuing throughout her life, Helen Farr Sloan nurtured a special relationship with the Delaware Art Museum. Because of Helen Farr Sloan’s gifts and scholarship, the Delaware Art Museum received more than 5,000 works including the preeminent collection of the work of John Sloan with virtually every aspect of his career represented. This has made the Delaware Art Museum the leading repository for the study of John Sloan, who was noted for his realistic images of turn-of-the-century New York City. In the early 1960s, she also taught art part-time at Regis High School in Manhattan.

Helen Farr Sloan joined The Howard Pyle Studio Group as a member and rented an art studio from the group where she lived on the second floor during her time in Wilmington, Delaware. While staying in Wilmington she developed a close friendship with members of The Studio Group who held two exhibitions of Helen Farr Sloan's work. The first exhibition was held May 1,2, and 3, 1992. The second Howard Pyle Studio Group exhibition of Farr's work was held in April of 1998. Catalogs with pictures were produced for both exhibitions.

In 1999 Teleduction produced a film titled Helen Farr Sloan: An Artistic Vision as part of an initiative to document the lives and careers of notable artists. The initiative was supported by the Delaware Art Museum as a teaching tool in their galleries. The videos were then distributed to public broadcasting stations, schools, and museums free of charge. The film premiered on February 23, 2000 at the Delaware Art Museum.

Helen Farr Sloan died at the age of 94 in Wilmington, Delaware.
