= Cape La Croix Creek =

River in Missouri, United States

Cape La Croix Creek is a stream in Cape Girardeau County in the U.S. state of Missouri. It is a tributary of the Mississippi River.

The stream headwaters arise at 37°24′19″N 89°34′27″W and it flows south passing through the eastern and southern portions of Cape Girardeau to its confluence with the Mississippi River at 37°16′30″N 89°31′39″W.

In 1699, Fathers Montigny, Davion and St. Cosme, French missionaries, erected a cross where this stream entered the Mississippi and prayed that this might be the beginning of Christianity among the Indians. The stream has ever since been known as Cape La Croix Creek. Cape La Croix is a rock island in the Mississippi River where the cross was erected.

== See also ==
- List of rivers of Missouri
