= Flora Creek =

Stream in Cape Girardeau County, Missouri, U.S.

Coordinates: 37.3403279°N 89.4767584°W

Flora Creek is a stream in Cape Girardeau County in the U.S. state of Missouri.

Flora Creek most likely was named after a pioneer citizen.

== See also ==
- List of rivers of Missouri
