= Tod Sloan =

Tod Sloan is the name of:

- Tod Sloan (jockey) (1874–1933), American thoroughbred horse racing jockey
- Tod Sloan (baseball) (1890–1956), American baseball player for the St. Louis Browns
- Tod Sloan (ice hockey) (1927–2017), Canadian ice hockey forward
