= Justice Sloan =

Justice Sloan may refer to:

- D. Lindley Sloan (1874–1962), chief judge of the Maryland Court of Appeals
- Edward Ray Sloan (1883–1964), associate justice of the Kansas Supreme Court
- Gordon Sloan (1911–2006), associate justice of the Oregon Supreme Court
- Richard Elihu Sloan (1857–1933), associate justice of the Arizona Territorial Supreme Court

== See also ==
- Judge Sloan (disambiguation)
- William A. Sloane, associate justice of the California Supreme Court
