= John Sloan =

American painter (1871–1951)

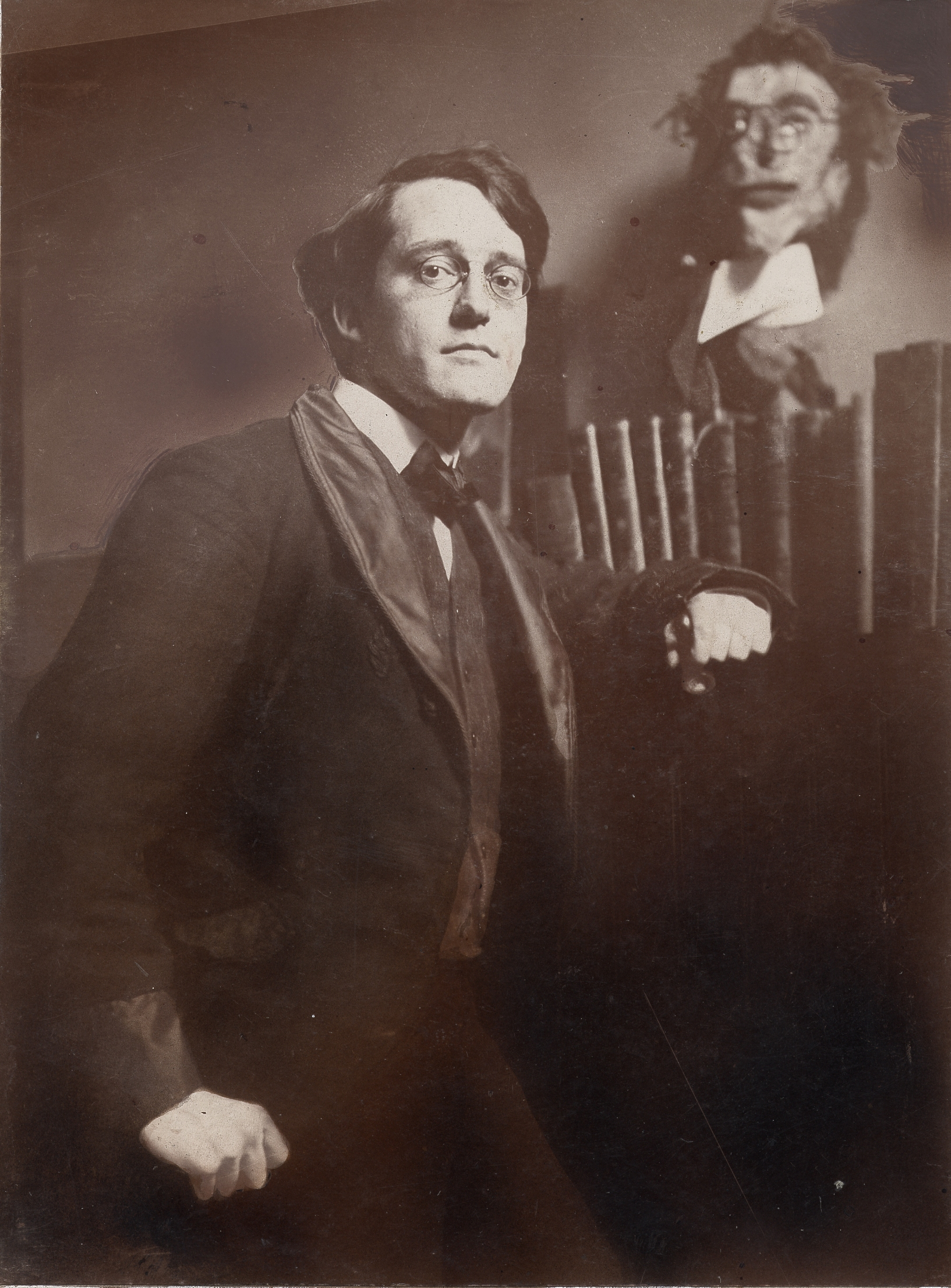
- Sloan in 1891
- Born: John French Sloan; August 2, 1871; Lock Haven, Pennsylvania, U.S.
- Died: September 7, 1951 (aged 80); Hanover, New Hampshire, U.S.
- Education: Pennsylvania Academy of the Fine Arts
- Known for: Painting, Etching
- Notable work: McSorley's Bar, (1912), Sixth Avenue Elevated at Third Street, (1928), Wake of the Ferry, (1907), and Hairdresser's Window, (1907)
- Movement: Ashcan School
- Awards: Gold Medal (1950)

John French Sloan (August 2, 1871 – September 7, 1951) was an American painter and etcher. He is considered to be one of the founders of the Ashcan school of American art. He was also a member of the group known as The Eight. He is best known for his urban genre scenes and ability to capture the essence of neighborhood life in New York City, often observed through his Chelsea studio window. Sloan has been called the premier artist of the Ashcan School, and also a realist painter who embraced the principles of Socialism, though he himself disassociated his art from his politics.

== Biography ==
John Sloan was born in Lock Haven, Pennsylvania, on August 2, 1871, to James Dixon Sloan, a man with artistic leanings who made an unsteady income in a succession of jobs, and Henrietta Ireland Sloan, a schoolteacher from an affluent family. Sloan grew up in Philadelphia, Pennsylvania, where he lived and worked until 1904, when he moved to New York City. He and his two sisters (Elizabeth and Marianna) were encouraged to draw and paint from an early age. In the fall of 1884 he enrolled at the prestigious Central High School in Philadelphia, where his classmates included William Glackens and Albert C. Barnes.

In the spring of 1888, his father experienced a mental breakdown that left him unable to work, and Sloan became responsible, at the age of sixteen, for the support of his parents and sisters. He dropped out of school in order to work full-time as an assistant cashier at Porter and Coates, a bookstore and seller of fine prints. His duties were light, allowing him many hours to read the books and examine the works in the store's print department. It was there that Sloan created his earliest surviving works, among which are pen-and-ink copies after Dürer and Rembrandt. He also began making etchings, which were sold in the store for a modest sum. In 1890, the offer of a higher salary persuaded Sloan to leave his position to work for A. Edward Newton, a former clerk for Porter and Coates who had opened his own stationery store. At Newton's, Sloan designed greeting cards and calendars and continued to work on his etchings. In that same year he also attended a night drawing class at the Spring Garden Institute, which provided him his first formal art training.

He soon left Newton's business in quest of greater freedom as a freelance commercial artist in 1891, but this venture produced little income. In 1892, he began working as an illustrator in the art department of The Philadelphia Inquirer. Later that same year, Sloan began taking evening classes at the Pennsylvania Academy of the Fine Arts under the guidance of the realist Thomas Anshutz. Among his fellow students was his old schoolmate William Glackens.

In 1892, Sloan met Robert Henri, a talented painter and charismatic advocate of artistic independence who became his mentor and closest friend. Henri encouraged Sloan in his graphic work and eventually convinced him to turn to painting. They shared a common artistic outlook and in the coming years promoted a new form of realism, known as the "Ashcan school" of American art. In 1893, Sloan and Henri founded the short-lived Charcoal Club together, whose members would also include Glackens, George Luks, and Everett Shinn.

Towards the end of 1895, Sloan decided to leave The Philadelphia Inquirer to work in the art department of The Philadelphia Press. His schedule was now less rigid, allowing him more time to paint. Henri offered encouragement and often sent Sloan reproductions of European artists, such as Manet, Hals, Goya and Velázquez.

In 1898, the socially awkward Sloan was introduced to Anna Maria (Dolly) Wall (born July 28, 1876), and the two fell immediately in love. In entering into a relationship with her, Sloan accepted the challenges posed by her alcoholism and her sexual history, which included prostitution; although Dolly worked in a department store by day, Sloan had, in fact, met her in a brothel. They were married on August 5, 1901, providing Sloan with an affectionate partner who believed in him absolutely, but whose lapses and mental instability led to frequent crises. A particularly close friend in their New York years, who helped the couple to weather many of these crises, was the artist John Butler Yeats, the elderly father of poet William Butler Yeats.

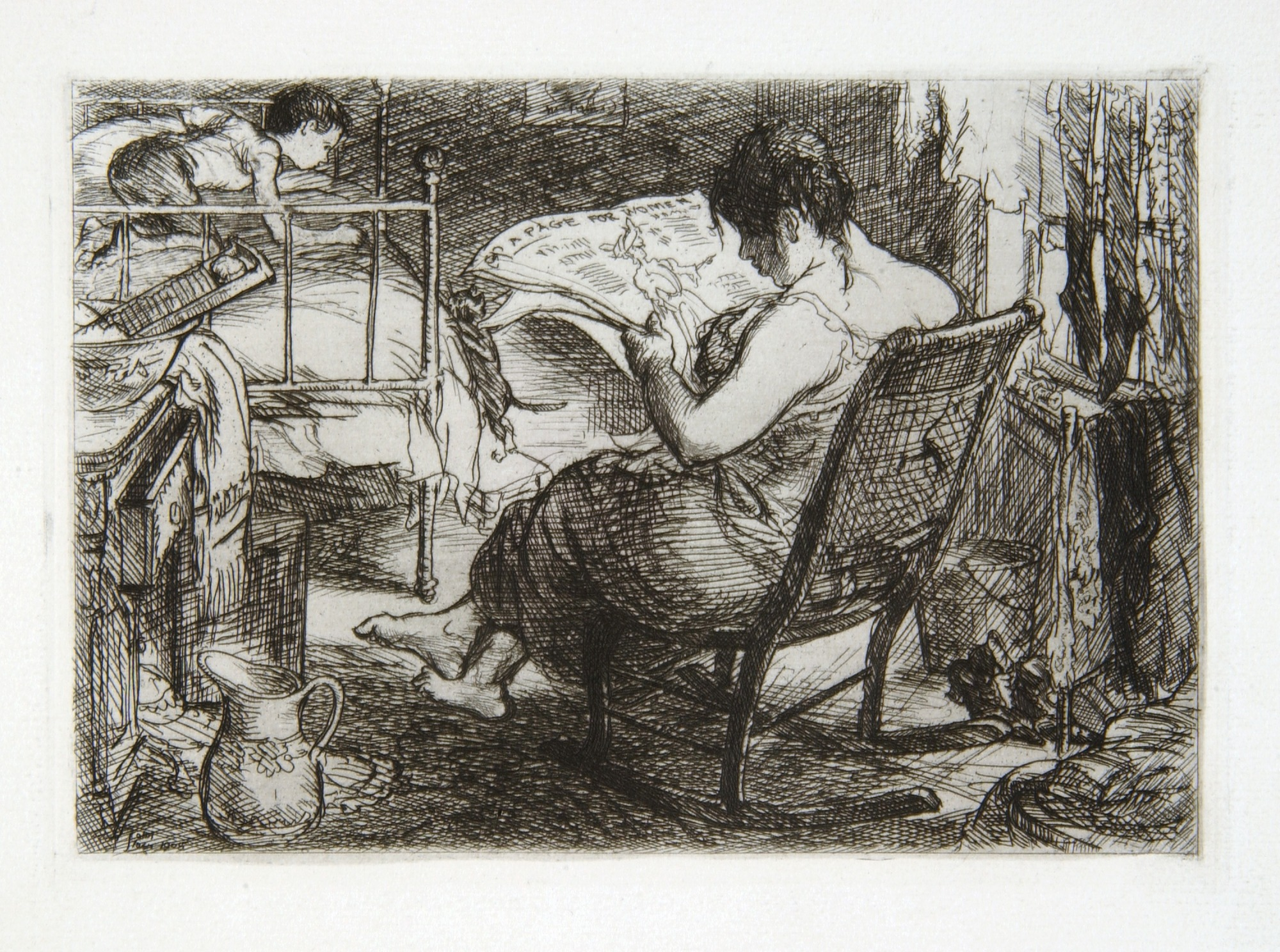
The Women's Page, from the series New York City Life, etching on paper, 1905

By 1903, Sloan had produced almost sixty oil paintings but had yet to establish a name for himself in the art world. In April 1904, he and Dolly moved to New York City and found quarters in Greenwich Village where he painted some of his best-known works, including McSorley's Bar, Sixth Avenue Elevated at Third Street, and Wake of the Ferry. He became increasingly prolific, but he sold little, and he continued to rely on his earnings as a freelancer for The Philadelphia Press, for which he continued to draw weekly puzzles until 1910. By 1905, he was supplementing this income by drawing illustrations for books (including Wilkie Collins' The Moonstone) and for such journals as Collier's Weekly, Good Housekeeping, Harper's Weekly, The Saturday Evening Post, and Scribner's. Sloan participated in the landmark 1908 exhibition at the Macbeth Galleries of a group that included four other artists from the Philadelphia Charcoal Club (Henri, Glackens, Luks and Shinn) as well as three artists who worked in a less realistic, more impressionistic style, Maurice Prendergast, Ernest Lawson, and Arthur B. Davies. The group was afterward collectively known as "The Eight." The Macbeth Galleries exhibition was intended as a rebuke to the restrictive exhibition practices of the powerful, conservative National Academy of Design. Sloan organized a touring exhibition of the paintings from that show that traveled to several cities from Newark to Chicago and elicited considerable discussion in the press about less academic approaches to art and new definitions of acceptable subject matter.

A doctor who was consulted in an effort to help Dolly overcome her drinking problem suggested a scheme to Sloan: he was to start a diary in which he would include his fondest thoughts of her, with the expectation that she would surreptitiously read it and be freed of her disabling fear that Sloan would leave her. Spanning the period from 1906 to early 1913, the diary soon grew beyond its initial purpose, and its publication in 1965 supplied researchers with a detailed chronicle of Sloan's activities and interests and a portrait of the pre-war art world.

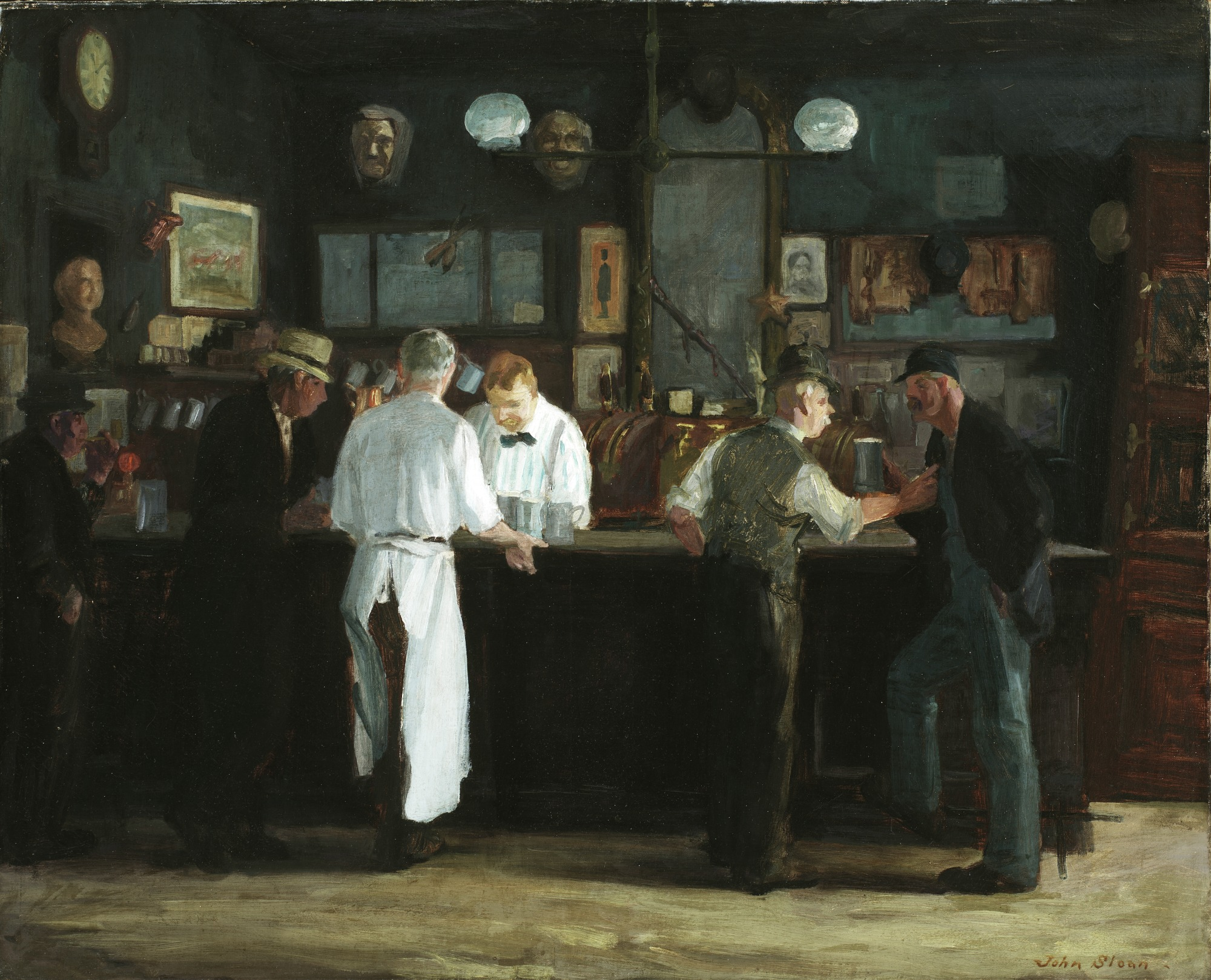
John French Sloan, McSorley's Bar, painted in 1912 after becoming regular at McSorley's, Detroit Institute of Arts

Sloan's growing discontent with what he called "the Plutocracy's government" led him to join the Socialist Party in 1910. Dolly Sloan also became active in Socialist projects at this time. John Sloan became the art editor of The Masses with the December 1912 issue and contributed powerful anti-war and anti-capitalist drawings to other socialist publications as well, such as the Call and Coming Nation. As Sloan was never entirely comfortable with propaganda, his work for these magazines did not always contain overt political content. His belief that "The Masses" was becoming too doctrinaire led to a dispute with fellow editors Max Eastman and Floyd Dell, causing him to resign his position with that journal in 1916. He was never an ally of the Communist Party in the United States, although he remained hopeful that the Soviet Union would succeed in creating an egalitarian society. Throughout his life, he identified with left-wing political causes and expressed vehement disapproval of the inequities of the American economic system. A pacifist, he also opposed the American entry into World War I.

In 1913, Sloan painted a two-hundred-foot backdrop for the Paterson Strike Pageant, a controversial work of performance art and radical politics organized by activist John Reed and philanthropist Mabel Dodge. The play, a benefit staged for the striking silk mill workers of Paterson, New Jersey, took place in Madison Square Garden and incorporated over 1,000 participants. Sloan has been called "the premier artist of the Ashcan School who painted the inexhaustible energy and life of New York City during the first decades of the twentieth century".

Also in 1913, Sloan participated in the legendary Armory Show. He served as a member of the organizing committee and also exhibited two paintings and five etchings. In that same year, the important collector Albert C. Barnes purchased one of Sloan's paintings; this was only the fourth sale of a painting for Sloan (although it has often erroneously been counted as his first). For Sloan, exposure to the European modernist works on view in the Armory Show initiated a gradual move away from the realist urban themes he had been painting for the previous ten years. In 1914–15, during summers spent in Gloucester, Massachusetts, he painted landscapes en plein air in a new, more fluid and colorful style influenced by Van Gogh and the Fauves.

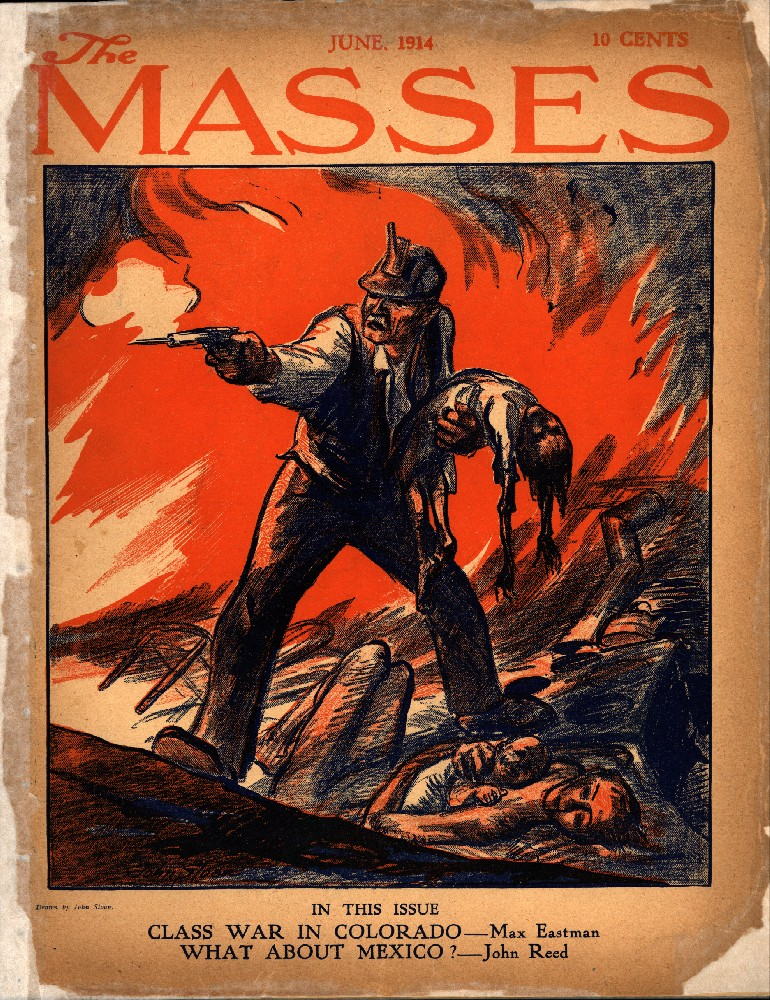
June 1914 cover of The Masses depicting the Ludlow Massacre

Beginning in 1914, Sloan taught at the Art Students League, where for the next eighteen years he became a charismatic if eccentric teacher. Sloan also taught briefly at the George Luks Art School. His students respected him for his practical knowledge and integrity, but feared his caustic tongue; as a well-known painter who had nonetheless sold very few paintings, he advised his students, "I have nothing to teach you that will help you to make a living." He disdained careerism among artists and urged his pupils to find joy in the creative process alone.

The summer of 1918 was the last he spent in Gloucester. For the next thirty years, he spent four months each summer in Santa Fe, New Mexico, where the desert landscape inspired a new concentration on the rendering of form. Still, the majority of his works were completed in New York. As a result of his time in the Southwest, he and Dolly developed a strong interest in Native American arts and ceremonies and, back in New York, became advocates of Indian artists. In 1922 he organized an exhibition of work by Native American artists at the Society of Independent Artists in New York. He also championed the work of Diego Rivera, whom he called "the one artist on this continent who is in the class of the old masters." The Society of Independent Artists, which Sloan had co-founded in 1916, gave Rivera and José Clemente Orozco their first showing in the United States in 1920.

In 1943, Dolly Sloan died of coronary heart disease. The next year, Sloan married Helen Farr, a former student forty years his junior with whom he had been romantically involved for a time in the 1930s. On September 7, 1951, Sloan died of cancer while vacationing in Hanover, New Hampshire. The following January the Whitney Museum of American Art presented a well-received retrospective of his career. Helen Farr Sloan, who became a noted philanthropist in her later years, oversaw the distribution of his unsold works to major museums throughout the country.

== Career ==
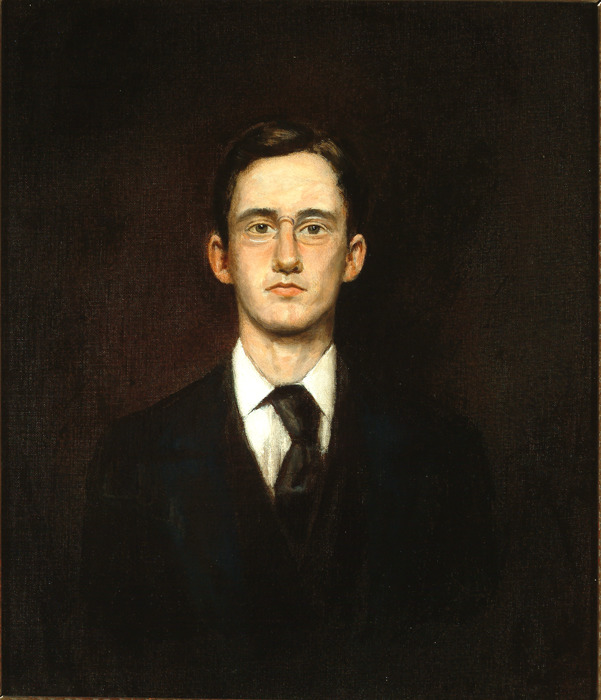
Self-portrait, 1890, oil on window shade, 14 x 11 7/8 inches, Delaware Art Museum, Gift of Helen Farr Sloan, 1970. A young man teaching himself to oil paint from a book, Sloan painted on whatever was available—in this case a window shade—and from the only model available, himself.

=== Training ===
Sloan's training consisted of his study and reproduction of works by painters such as Rembrandt, a few classes at various institutions, mentorship by Robert Henri, and his work experience as an etcher and draughtsman. The high school that Sloan attended had a good art department, but it is not known whether he gained any training there. Sloan worked several jobs in draughtsmanship, etching, and commercial artwork before he attended the Pennsylvania Academy of the Fine Arts, where he studied briefly under Thomas Anshutz. The experience Sloan gathered from his various press jobs provided him with a certain amount of knowledge and allowed room for him to explore and expand in his free time. Henri's mentorship was significant in Sloan's training because he encouraged him to paint more, and introduced him to the work of various artists, whose techniques, composition, and style Sloan studied. He sought additional guidance from Ruskin's The Elements of Drawing and John Collier's A Manual of Oil Painting. Sloan believed his study and mentorship at the Pennsylvania Academy of the Fine Arts, as well as his early Philadelphia experiences, to be his "college education."

=== Early influences ===
At a young age, Sloan had been exposed to numerous books and reproductions through his uncle, Alexander Priestley, who held an extensive collection in his library. One major influence that he discovered was John Leech, an English caricaturist. When Sloan entered his position at The Philadelphia Press his newspaper drawings reflected the style of Leech, Charles Keene and George du Maurier. But by 1894 he had begun attracting attention with decorative illustrations in a new style related to the poster movement; these works combine the influences of European artists of the late nineteenth and early twentieth century, including Walter Crane, and reveal Sloan's study of Botticelli and Japanese prints.

Sloan's early paintings may have been influenced by Thomas Eakins as a result of his time studying under Anshutz. In 1893, Sloan and Glackens became regulars at a weekly "open house" at Henri's studio, where he encouraged the young men to read Whitman and Emerson and led discussions of such books as George Moore's Modern Painting and William Morris Hunt's Talks on Art. Henri believed in the need to create a new, less genteel American art that spoke more immediately to the spirit of the age, an outlook that found ready adherents in Sloan and Glackens.

== Style and the Ashcan School ==
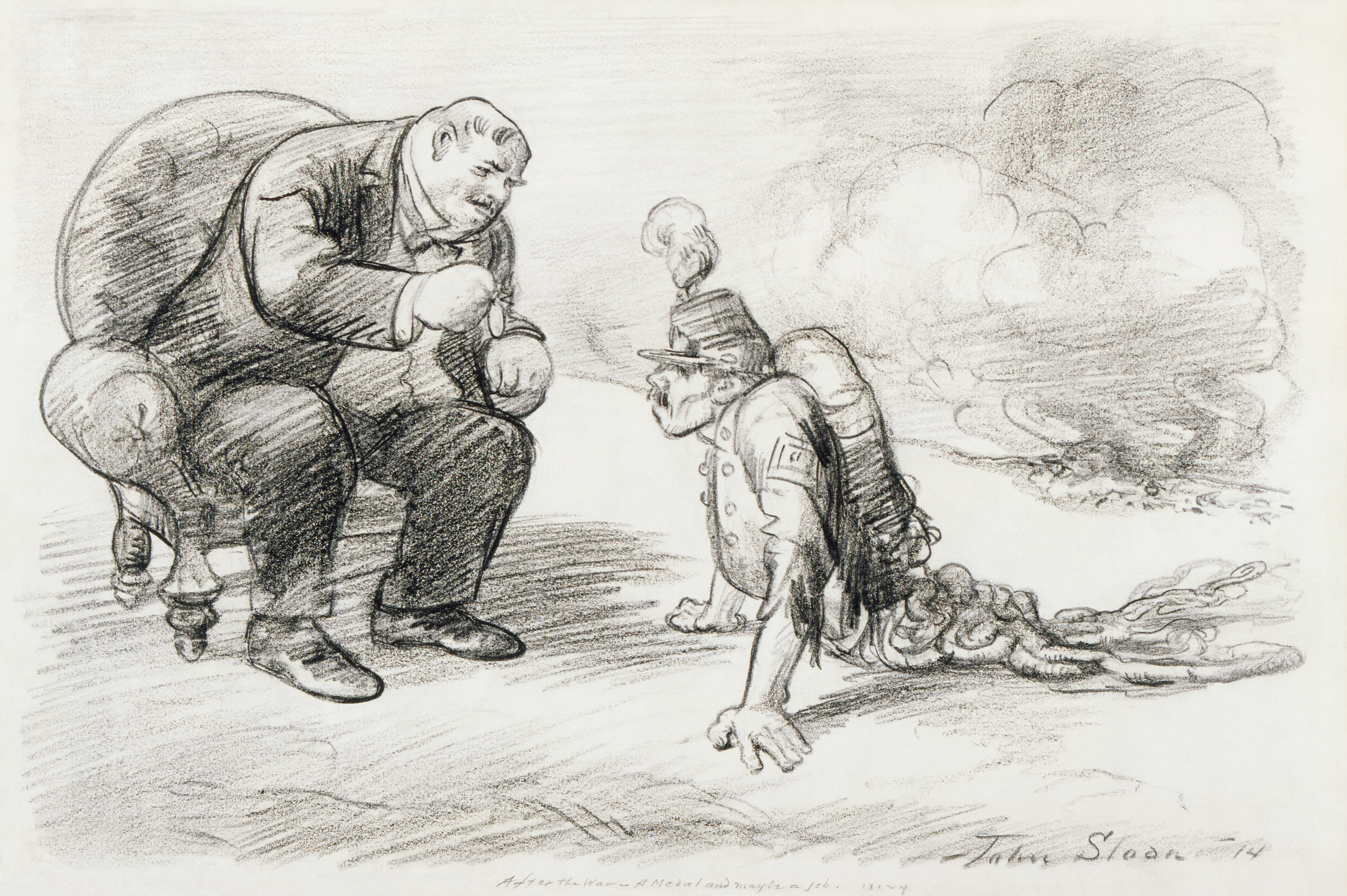
After the War a Medal and Maybe a Job, anti-World War I political cartoon, 1914 (digitally restored)

As someone who painted city crowds and tenement rooms, shop girls and streetwalkers, charwomen and hairdressers, Sloan is one of the artists most closely identified with the Ashcan School. Yet it was a term Sloan despised. He came to feel that it homogenized too many different painters, concentrated viewers' attention on content rather than style, and presupposed a muckraking intent. His wariness was not misplaced: exhibitions of Ashcan art in recent decades often stress its documentary quality and importance as part of an historical record, whereas Sloan felt that any artist worth anything had to be appreciated for his skilled brushwork, color, and composition.

Unlike Henri, Sloan was not a facile painter and labored over his work, leading Henri to remark that "Sloan" was "the past participle of 'slow.'" (When Glackens and Sloan were at The Philadelphia Inquirer, Glackens usually got the reportorial assignments because he was more adept than Sloan in making quick sketches.) His methodical approach towards sketching carried over to his painting. "Sloan's approach to making urban realist art was based on images seen and remembered (and sometimes written down) rather than sketched in the street, even though his autographic handling of paint and print media conveys the look of a rapid drawing. The effect is conceptual rather than perceptual, which Sloan denigrated as "eyesight painting." This was a major characteristic of his style, consistent with the Ashcan School's goal of presenting a subject to the viewer with all the immediacy of a snapshot.

Sloan tended to observe city dwellers interacting in an intimate setting. A student of his wrote, he "concerned himself with what we call genre: street scenes, restaurant life, paintings of saloons, ferry boats, roof tops, back yards, and so on through a whole catalogue of commonplace subjects." Like Edward Hopper, Sloan often used the perspective of the window in his painting, in order to gain a tight focus, but also to observe his subject undetected. He wrote in his diary, in 1911; "I am in the habit of watching every bit of human life I can see about my windows, but I do it so that I am not observed at it ... No insult to the people you are watching to do so unseen." Sloan's attention to isolated incidents within the urban environment recalls the narrative techniques used in the realist fiction and Hollywood films he enjoyed.

Sloan was described as an "early twentieth-century realist painter who embraced the principles of Socialism and placed his artistic talents at the service of those beliefs." Yet whenever Sloan was asked about the social context of his paintings or about his fervent Socialism, he said that his paintings were made with "sympathy, but no social consciousness ... I was never interested in putting propaganda into my paintings, so it annoys me when art historians try to interpret my city life pictures as 'socially conscious.' I saw the everyday life of the people, and on the whole I picked out bits of joy in human life for my subject matter."

In the late 1920s, just as the market for his city pictures was finally reaching a point at which he might have made a comfortable living, Sloan changed his technique and abandoned his characteristic urban subject matter in favor of nudes and portraits. This independence was entirely typical of him, to the dismay of his dealer, Charles Kraushaar. Rejecting as superficial the spontaneous painterly technique of Manet and Hals—and also of Robert Henri and George Luks—he turned instead to the underpainting and glazing method used by old masters such as Andrea Mantegna. It was an eccentric choice. The resulting paintings, which often made unconventional use of superimposed hatchings to define the forms, have never attained the popularity of his early Ashcan works.

== Legacy ==
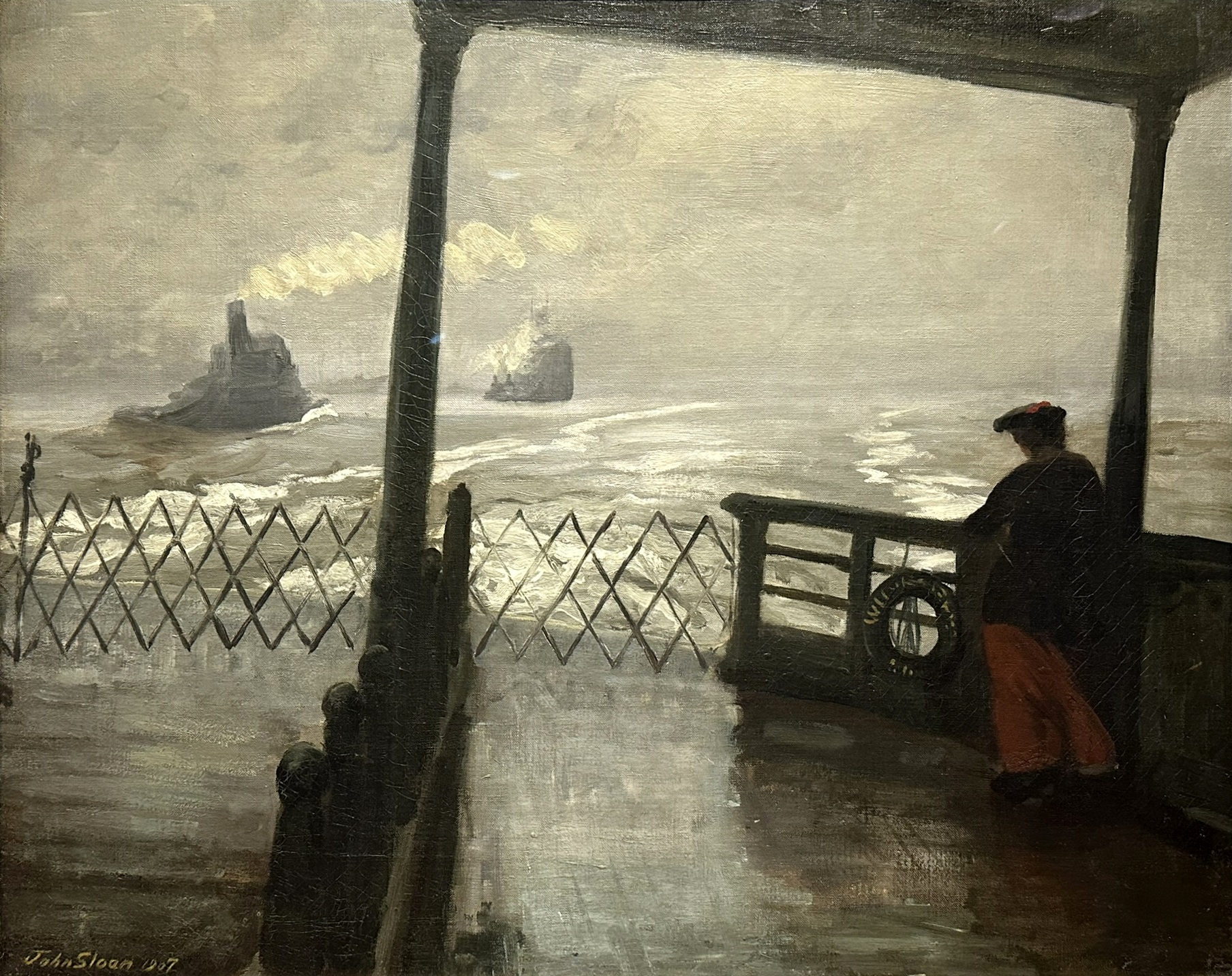
The Wake of the Ferry II (1907), The Phillips Collection

Sloan's paintings are represented in almost all major American museums. Among his best-known works are Hairdresser's Window (1907) in the collection of the Wadsworth Atheneum, The Picnic Ground (1907) in the collection of the Whitney Museum of American Art, The Haymarket (1907) in the collection of the Brooklyn Museum, Yeats at Petitpas in the collection of the Corcoran Gallery of Art, McSorley's Bar (1912) in the collection of the Detroit Institute of Arts, The 'City' from Greenwich Village (1922) in the collection of the National Gallery of Art, and The White Way (1927) in the collection of the Philadelphia Museum of Art. In 1971, his painting Wake of the Ferry (1907) was reproduced on a U.S. postage stamp honoring Sloan.

His students included Peggy Bacon, Aaron Bohrod, Alexander Calder, Joseph De Martini, Reginald Marsh, Xavier J. Barile, Barnett Newman, Minna Citron, and Norman Raeben. In 1939, he published a book of his teachings and aphorisms, Gist of Art, which remained in print for over sixty years.

In American Visions, the critic Robert Hughes praised Sloan's art for "an honest humaneness, a frank sympathy, a refusal to flatten its figures into stereotypes of class misery ... He saw his people as part of larger totality, the carnal and cozy body of the city itself." In American Painting from the Armory Show to the Depression, art historian Milton Brown called Sloan "the outstanding figure of the Ash Can School." To his friend, the painter John Butler Yeats, and to art critic Henry McBride, he was "an American Hogarth."

The lobby of the United States Post Office in Bronxville, New York, features a mural by Sloan painted in 1939 and titled The Arrival of the First Mail in Bronxville in 1846 commissioned by the Treasury Section of Fine Arts. The post office and mural were listed on the National Register of Historic Places in 1988.

== See also ==
- American realism
- Ashcan school

== Sources ==
- Brooks, Van Wyck. John Sloan: a Painter's Life. New York: E.P. Dutton & Co, 1955.
- Hills, Patricia, "John Sloan's Images of Working-Class Women: A Case Study of the Roles and Interrelationships of Politics, Personality, and Patrons in the Development of Sloan's Art, 1905–16", Prospects 5 (1980): 157–96. Cambridge University Press.
- Loughery, John. John Sloan: Painter and Rebel . New York: Henry Holt, 1995. ISBN 0-8050-5221-6
