= Sloan Creek (Missouri) =

Stream in eastern Cape Girardeau County, Missouri, U.S.

Sloan Creek is a stream in eastern Cape Girardeau County, Missouri, in the United States. It is a tributary to the Mississippi River.

The stream headwaters arise in north Cape Girardeau at 37°20′48″N 89°32′10″W and it flows southeasterly approximately 2.5 miles through northeast Cape Girardeau to enter the Mississippi due east of Southeast Missouri State College at 37°18′53″N 89°30′48″W.

The stream was named after the owner of a local mill.

== See also ==
- List of rivers of Missouri
