= Sloan Lake (Minnesota) =

Lake in the state of Minnesota, United States

- Location within Minnesota
- Location: Hubbard County, Minnesota
- Coordinates: 46°59.5′N 95°8.75′W
- Type: lake

Sloan Lake is a lake in Hubbard County, in the U.S. state of Minnesota.

Sloan Lake was named for John Sloan, an early settler.

== See also ==
- List of lakes in Minnesota
