= Jonathan Sloane =

American politician

Member of the U.S. House of Representatives from Ohio's 15th district
- In office March 4, 1833 – March 3, 1837
- Preceded by: new district
- Succeeded by: John W. Allen

Member of the Ohio House of Representatives from Portage and Medina counties
- In office 1820–1822
- Preceded by: Jonathan Foster
- Succeeded by: George B. Depeyster; Joseph Harris

Personal details
- Born: November 1785 Pelham, Massachusetts
- Died: April 25, 1854 (aged 68) Ravenna, Ohio
- Resting place: Evergreen Cemetery
- Party: Anti-Masonic
- Education: Williams College

Jonathan Sloane (November 1785 – April 25, 1854) was a U.S. representative from Ohio.

Born in Pelham, Massachusetts in November 1785, Sloane completed preparatory studies and was graduated from Williams College, Williamstown, Massachusetts, in 1812. He studied law, was admitted to the bar in 1816, and commenced practice in Ravenna, Ohio. He was also general agent of the Tappan family for the sale of lands. He served as prosecuting attorney of Portage County in 1819. He served in the Ohio House of Representatives from 1820 to 1822, and in the Ohio Senate in 1826 and 1827.

Sloane was elected as an Anti-Masonic candidate to the Twenty-third and the Twenty-fourth Congresses (March 4, 1833 – March 3, 1837). He declined to be a candidate for renomination in 1836. He retired from business activities on account of ill health. He died in Ravenna, Ohio, April 25, 1854. He was interred in Evergreen Cemetery.

Ohio House of Representatives
Preceded by Jonathan Foster	Representative from Portage and Medina Counties; 1820–1822; Served alongside: James Moore	Succeeded by George B. Depeyster; Joseph Harris
U.S. House of Representatives
New district	Representative from Ohio's 15th congressional district 1833-03-04 – 1837-03-03	Succeeded by John W. Allen
