= The Story of King Arthur and His Knights =

1903 novel by Howard Pyle

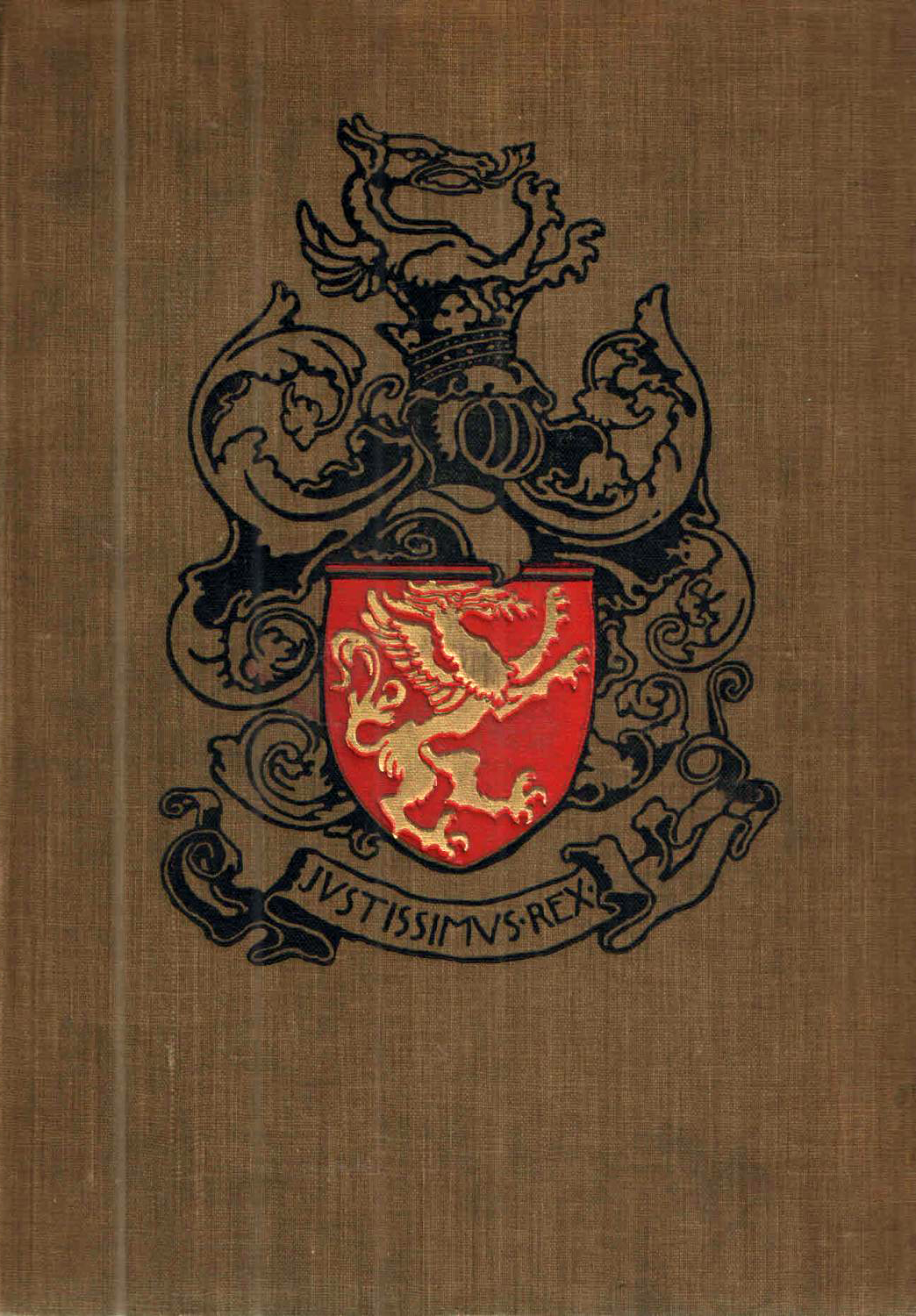
- Cover of the first printing of the 1903 edition
- Author: Howard Pyle
- Language: English
- Genre: Children's literature, historical fiction
- Published: November 1903
- Publisher: Charles Scribner's Sons
- Publication place: United States
- Pages: 416
- Followed by: The Story of the Champions of the Round Table
- Text: The Story of King Arthur and His Knights at Wikisource

The Story of King Arthur and His Knights is a 1903 children's novel by the American illustrator and writer Howard Pyle. The book contains a compilation of various stories, adapted by Pyle, regarding the legendary King Arthur of Britain and select Knights of the Round Table. Pyle's novel begins with Arthur in his youth and continues through numerous tales of bravery, romance, hardship, battle, and knighthood.

Pyle's rendition is an American adaption of traditionally English stories of the Arthurian legends. Although with some unique embellishments, it draws heavily on previous authors' stories, such as the then-recent The Boy's King Arthur (1880) by fellow American Sidney Lanier; Tennyson's Idylls of the King (1859–1885); James Thomas Knowles's The Legends of King Arthur and His Knights (1860); and ultimately Malory's Le Morte d'Arthur (1485), the primary source material for all of the above.

== Plot ==
=== The Book of King Arthur ===
The first section in Pyle's The Story of King Arthur and His Knights, "The Book of King Arthur", contains three separate stories: "The Winning of Kinghood", "The Winning of a Sword", and "The Winning of a Queen".

==== The Winning of Kinghood ====
Howard Pyle's version of the tales of King Arthur introduces the reader to Arthur as a child. Arthur, having been raised by foster parents, has no knowledge of his noble lineage. One day, an 18 year-old Arthur finds a sword and succeeds in pulling it out of an enchanted anvil, a task thought to be impossible. Arthur, now bearing the magic sword, learns of his royal lineage and becomes the King of Britain.

==== The Winning of a Sword ====
King Arthur loses to his enemy, King Pellinore, and suffers many wounds. Merlin, a wizard, advises Arthur to seek Excalibur, a very powerful sword. With the instructions provided by the Lady of the Lake, Arthur takes Excalibur. He then meets Pellinore again and then defeats the king with Excalibur's magic. The two, thereafter, make amends and become close friends.

==== The Winning of a Queen ====
King Arthur is captivated by Lady Guinevere, the daughter of Arthur's friend King Leodegrance. In an attempt to win her love, Arthur visits Cameliard, the castle where Lady Guinevere lives. With Merlin's help, Arthur disguises himself as a peasant and works as a gardener below Lady Guinevere's tower.

King Ryence threatens Leodegrance and demands that the Duke of North Umber be allowed to marry Guinevere. The Duke torments the people of Cameliard by parading in front of the castle, calling for someone to challenge him. Arthur accepts the challenge and defeats the Duke. After his victory, Arthur travels through the country and encounters Sir Geraint, Sir Gawaine, Sir Ewaine, and Sir Pellias. Arthur defeats the knights in battle and demands their servitude.

Arthur, disguised as a peasant, returns to Cameliard, and is challenged again by the Duke. Arthur commands his new knights to obey to him and asks to be Guinevere's champion. Arthur and his knights defeat the Duke and his companions. After the battle, Arthur reveals himself to King Leodegrance and asks for the hand of his daughter.

=== The Book of Three Worthies ===
The second section of Pyle's novel is separated into three stories: "The Story of Merlin", "The Story of Sir Pellias", and "The Story of Sir Gawain".

==== The Story of Merlin ====
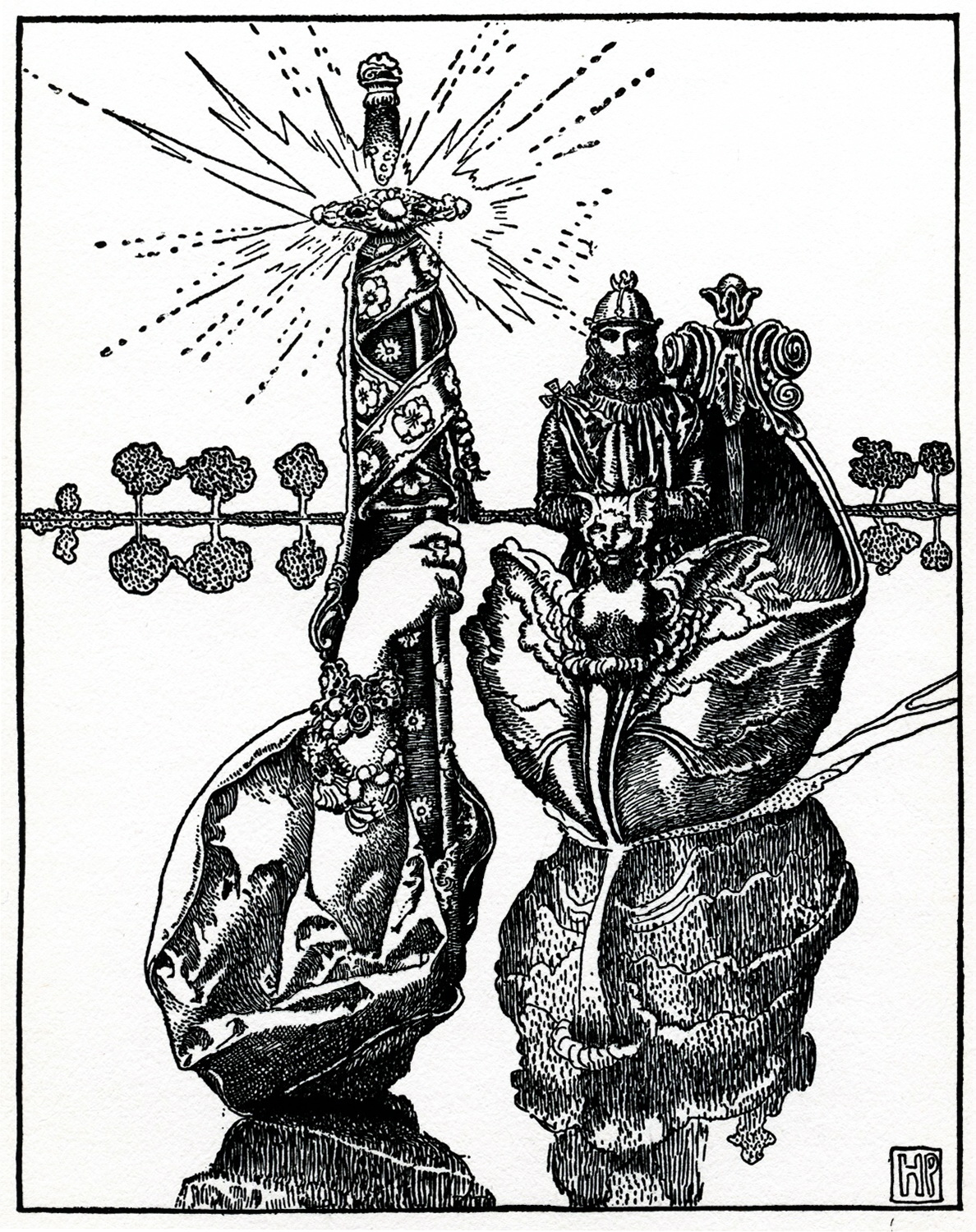
Pyle "Excalibur and the Sword" illustration from the 1903 edition of The Story of King Arthur and His Knights, 1903

Merlin is bewitched by an aspiring young sorceress named Vivien, a friend of Queen Morgana le Fay, who is the sister of King Arthur. Morgana seeks revenge against Arthur because he did not choose her son Sir Baudemagus to be a member of the Round Table. Merlin teaches Vivien sorcery, but she uses Merlin's teachings to concoct a potion, which incapacitates Merlin. Merlin, shortly before his death, prophesizes that Arthur will encounter trouble, and the wizard's dying wish is for Vivien to save Arthur. Vivien proceeds to have Merlin buried alive but promises to aid King Arthur.

As Vivien works against Merlin, King Arthur and Sir Accalon are lost while hunting. Searching for their way out, the two see a ship coming to shore. The ship is run by fairies, who offer Arthur and Accalon a feast and rooms for the night. Arthur wakes a prisoner in the dungeon of Sir Domas le Noir, and the only way to escape is to battle against Sir Ontzlake, Sir Domas's brother. Accalon awakes in a strange place with a fair maiden. She asks him to fight for Sir Ontzlake against Sir Domas and offers Excalibur as a reward if he accepts.

Arthur and Accalon, not recognizing each other, fight a bloody and harsh battle. Near death, Vivien leads the men to a nunnery. Vivien is able to restore Arthur's health though he must rest for a while. When Arthur asks Vivien to treat Accalon, she lies, claiming she has no more of her concoction. Accalon dies from his wounds. Morgana steals the sheath of Excalibur while Arthur rests, and she drops the sheath back into the lake where it was found.

Once Arthur wakes, he is outraged; he, Vivien, and his men search for Morgana. Morgana transforms herself into a rock, but Vivien recognizes her and begs Arthur to kill her. Arthur, however, forgives his sister, upsetting Vivien.

==== The Story of Sir Pellias ====
While the queen, her court, and Sir Pellias are out maying, a damsel named Parcenet approaches them. The maiden explains that she comes to see if the queen is more beautiful than her Lady Ettard, who is reputed in her area to be the most beautiful woman in the world. Sir Pellias agrees to go to Grantmesnle, the home of Lady Ettard, to settle the matter with her knight Sir Engamore of Malverat.

As Parcenet and Sir Pellias journey to Grantmesnle, they venture into the legendary Forest of Adventure. There, the two find an old woman who asks for help crossing the stream. Sir Pellias helps the old woman onto his horse and passes through stream. The knight helps the old woman down from the horse, and she transforms into the Lady of the Lake. The Lady gives Pellias a beautiful magic necklace, which makes the wearer adored by all who see him. Under the spell of the necklace, Sir Pellias becomes deeply infatuated with Lady Ettard. However, Lady Ettard feels no love for Sir Pellias once he removes off the necklace. Sir Pellias humiliates himself with his unrequited affection.

The Lady of the Lake tells Sir Gawain to go to Grantmesnle and bring sense to Sir Pellias. Sir Pellias accepts his help, and they devise a plan, but Sir Gawaine is charmed by Lady Ettard. Sir Pellias and Sir Gawaine fight, wherein Pellias, although victorious, is wounded by Gawaine. Pellias, near death, is brought to the chapel of a healing hermit. The Lady of the Lake comes, takes the charmed necklace, and revives Pellias with a potion. Although Pellias is revived, he is no longer fully mortal; the knight is half-mortal and half-fairy. The Lady of the Lake and Sir Pellias travel to their fairy city hidden on the lake where they are married.

==== The Tale of Sir Gawaine ====
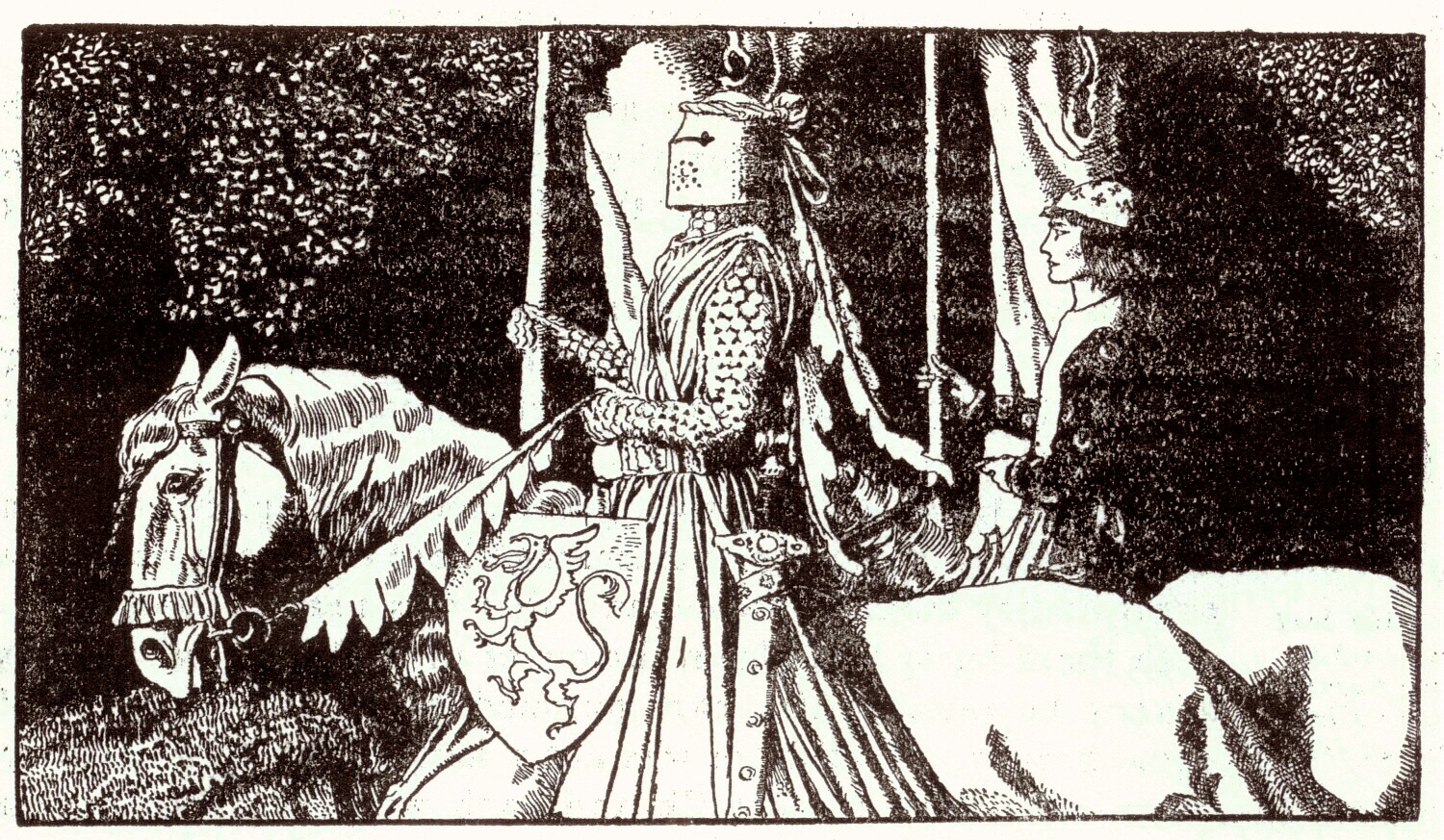
Pyle-Sir Gawain, illustration from the 1903 edition of The Story of King Arthur and His Knights, 1903

During a procession of King Arthur and his Court, the men see a dog pursuing a deer. Immediately after, the men see a knight and a lady attacked by another knight, who takes the woman captive. Upon King Arthur's request, Sir Gawaine and his brother go to discover the meaning of these events. Gawaine and his brother arrive at a castle where they see the dog killed. In a rage, Gawaine pursues the deer into the castle courtyard and kills it, believing that the dog died because it pursued the deer.

The lady of the castle is distressed over the deer's death, so Sir Ablamor, the lord of the castle, challenges Gawaine to a fight. Gawaine bests Ablamor but does not kill him. Because Gawaine shows him mercy, Ablamor invites Gawain to dine in his castle and explains the series of strange events. Sometime earlier, Ablamor's sister-in-law went riding with Ablamor's wife when the two women came across another woman: the sorceress Vivien. Vivien gave the two a dog and deer. The two animals created conflict between Sir Ablamor and his brother.

During the Court's procession, Lord Ablamor saw the dog chasing his wife's deer and became greatly angered. When Ablamor saw his brother and sister-in-law, Ablamor concluded that the pursuit of the deer was on purpose, struck his brother, and took his sister-in-law captive. Gawaine returns to King Arthur's court and relates these events to him.

Shortly after, King Arthur leaves, seeking adventure. Arthur and his esquire are lost in a forest and seek shelter in a castle. Arthur and his esquire meet an older knight who challenges King Arthur to see who could survive getting their head cut off. Arthur strikes first, and the older knight lives. The old knight says he will spare King Arthur's life if, after a year and a day, Arthur returns and answers a riddle.

A year and a day pass wherein King Arthur seeks in vain to an answer to the riddle, but he sets out to fulfill his promise. On the way, he meets an old woman who promises to tell him the answer to the riddle on the condition that she may marry a knight of his court. King Arthur agrees to the woman's condition and defeats the old knight. To keep his promise, King Arthur brings the woman to his court and allows her to choose a knight to marry. She chose Sir Gawaine, which is upsets the knight. After they marry, the woman tests Gawaine. When he proves to be a worthy knight, she reveals herself as the Lady of the Lake.

== Characters ==
King Arthur is the central character in Pyle's novel, but several other characters are focused on in the novel as well as the literary criticism on Pyle's work. Queen Guinevere, Vivien, and Morgana le Fay are the main female characters within the stories, and the Lady of the Lake is also a character central to the plot. King Arthur's knights Sir Gawain and Sir Pelias are the two most involved in the overall series of events, with Merlin being another central male character.

== Literary criticism ==
Julie Nelson Couch, in the article "Howard Pyle's The Story of King Arthur and His Knights and the Bourgeois Boy Reader", writes of how Pyle's use of social status and gender perpetuate certain aspects of medieval literature as well as of bourgeois society. Couch touches on Pyle's use of positive character traits, such as bravery and morality, and their links to characters of high social standing. Couch also writes of Pyle's use of language and how certain terms in Pyle's writing are used to engage middle-class, young, male readers.

== Reception ==
Rather than simply retell the stories authored by Sidney Lanier, Alfred Lord Tennyson, and Sir Thomas Malory, Pyle created new versions of the Arthurian tales, including different adventures, and implementing his own imagination to embellish the plots. Pyle's writing of the Arthurian stories "[used] text and illustrations to complement one another ... in the presentation of natural description". Helmut Nickel, in his essay "Arms and Armor in Arthurian Films", called Pyle's illustrations "glorious", and worthy of use for inspiration for any Arthurian film.

== Other works ==
Pyle wrote several other books concerning King Arthur and his knights, including:

- The Story of the Champions of the Round Table
- The Story of Sir Launcelot and His Companions
- The Story of the Grail and the Passing of King Arthur

== Sources ==
- Couch, Julie (2003). "Howard Pyle's The Story of King Arthur and His Knights and the Bourgeois Boy Reader". Arthuriana. 13 (2): 38–53. doi:10.1353/art.2003.0050. JSTOR 27870515. S2CID 162317007.
- Lupack, Alan; Lupack, Barbara Tepa (1999). King Arthur in America. University of Rochester Press.
- Nickel, Helmut (2002). "Arms and Armor in Arthurian Films". In Harty, Kevin J. (ed.). Cinema Arthuriana: Twenty Essays. McFarland & Company.
