= Clyde O. DeLand =

American painter

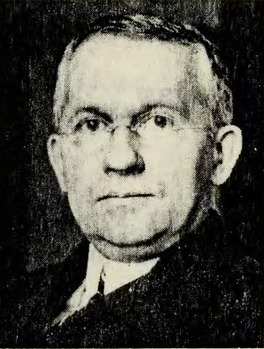
- Born: December 27, 1872; Union City
- Died: March 27, 1947
- Occupations: Painter, illustrator

Clyde Osmer DeLand (December 27, 1872 – March 27, 1947, also spelled Deland or De Land) was an American painter and illustrator. Though he is relatively unknown today, DeLand was one of the first graduates of Howard Pyle's class at the Drexel Institute of Art, Science and Industry (now Drexel University) alongside names like N. C. Wyeth. His paintings hang in many galleries around the world and his illustrations have remained in print in illustrated editions of such works as Charles Chesnutt's The Wife of His Youth.

== Life and early education ==
Clyde Osmer DeLand was born in Union City, Pennsylvania to Theodore and Nancy Howard DeLand, of Pennsylvania. Theodore Deland apparently worked as a machinist around the time that Clyde was born.

After graduating from Rochester High School, Clyde DeLand enrolled at the University of Rochester in 1891 but stayed for only a year. In that time, he also joined the Delta Upsilon fraternity. In a later profile on the artist, fellow Delta Upsilon brother Fullerton L. Waldo suggests that "while in Rochester an alternative career proposed itself to DeLand in the cognate art of music ... DeLand practised (sic) and studied the piano till he became a really proficient concert pianist and teacher, and only by the narrowest margin did he miss electing music as his permanent calling." This seems to be corroborated by a record of a solo performance of "War Veteran's March" given by young DeLand following the address of Lieutenant-Governor Edward F. Jones at the Eighth Annual Convention of the Woman's Relief Corps in Rochester in 1890.

== Howard Pyle and the Drexel Institute ==
DeLand enrolled in the Drexel Institute in 1894, the same year that artist Howard Pyle began his teaching career there. It would seem, as his career would later attest, that DeLand was inspired by Pyle's pedagogical emphasis on historical verisimilitude in art. As O'Hara relates that during modeling sessions at Drexel it was not uncommon that "[Pyle] brought in period artifacts and props to create the feel, and even the smell, of another time and to stress the importance of accuracy in details." When Pyle founded the School of Illustration at Drexel in 1896, DeLand was among the first class under the new cirriculum, which placed importance on preparing and promoting students for publication.

Beginning in the summer of 1898, Pyle and Drexel instituted a special summer program through the School of Illustration which would take on a select few students and allow them, provided with special scholarships, to study with Pyle over the summer. These would take place not on campus, but in and around Pyle's personal studios at Chadds Ford, Delaware, near his native Wilmington. Along with their mentor's connections and recommendations, Pyle's students were featured in an annual summer exhibition at Drexel, in which they could promote themselves for publication. Thus, Jill and Robert May relate an anecdote in which Pyle is asked to display some of his art in exhibition:

In Boston, Ross Turner was planning an exhibition of colonial times and asked if he could have something by Pyle in the show, expressly identifying The First Salute to the Flag as a work that he would like to display. Pyle replied that the specific picture sought was actually by "Mr. Clyde O. DeLand, a pupil of mine," adding that he believed the picture was "in the possession of the Harpers." He offered to contact DeLand and ask that he "look the matter up."

Indeed, many of the students used the summer program and the exhibition in order to work on and display illustrations for which they had already signed contracts. DeLand was showing several such works in the 1898 Drexel summer exhibition, and by the end of the next year, he had procured more illustration contracts from such publishers as Houghton Mifflin. After he graduated from Pyle's classes, in either 1898 or 1899, DeLand moved back to his native Philadelphia to begin a "relatively modest career" as a professional illustrator.

== Selected bibliography ==
Beginning around 1899, DeLand became an increasingly visible presence in American popular fiction. His name appears as illustrator on many title pages following some of the top authors of his day.

Book illustrations

- The Wife of His Youth and Other Stories of the Color Line by Charles Chesnutt: Houghton Mifflin (1899)
- The Count's Snuff Box by George R.R. Rivers: Little, Brown and Co. (1899)
- Fife and Drum at Louisburg by James Macdonald Oxley: Little, Brown and Co. (1899)
- Miscellanies: Biographical and Other Sketches and Letters by Nathaniel Hawthorne: Houghton Mifflin (1900)
- Scouting for Washington: A Story of the Days of Sumter and Tarleton by John Preston True: Little, Brown and Co. (1900)
- A Daughter of New France by Mary Catherine Crowley: Little, Brown and Co. (1901)
- Cinderella by S.R. Crockett and Thomas Watson Ball: Dodd, Mead, and Co. (1901)
- Barnaby Lee by John Bennett: The Century Company (1902)
- A Colonial Maid of Old Virginia by Lucy Foster Madison: The Pennsylvania Publishing Company (1902)
- Jack and His Island by Lucy M. Thruston: Little, Brown and Co. (1902)
- Love Thrives in War by Mary Catherine Crowley: Little, Brown and Co. (1903)
- A Daughter of the Union by Lucy Foster Madison: The Pennsylvania Publishing Company (1903)
- A Forest Hearth by Charles Major: MacMillan Co. (1903)
- White Aprons by Maud Wilder Goodwin: Little, Brown and Co. (1904)
- With Puritan and Pequot by William Murray Graydon: The Pennsylvania Publishing Company (1904)
- In Doublet and Hose by Lucy Foster Madison: The Pennsylvania Publishing Company (1904)
- Kris Kringle: A Christmas Tale by S. Weir Mitchell: G.W. Jacobs & Co. (1904)
- Dorothy's Spy by James Otis: T.Y. Cromwell (1904)
- Chronicles of the Little Tot by Edmund Vance Cook: Dodge Publishing Company (1905)
- The Queen's Hostage by Harriet T. Comstock: Little, Brown and Co. (1906)
- The Young Musician by Horatio Alger, Jr.: The Pennsylvania Publishing Company (1906)
- With John Paul Jones by John Thomas McIntyre: The Pennsylvania Publishing Company (1906)
- The Boy Tars of 1812 by John Thomas McIntyre: The Pennsylvania Publishing Company (1907)
- Peggy Owen: A Story for Girls by Lucy Foster Madison: The Pennsylvania Publishing Company (1908)
- The Boynton Pluck by Helen Ward Banks: The Pennsylvania Publishing Company (1923)
- The Ranger of the Susquehannock by Reginald Wright Kauffman: The Pennsylvania Publishing Company (1924)
- Seventy Six!: A Story of the Revolutionary War by Reginald Wright Kauffman: The Pennsylvania Publishing Company (1926)
- Seventy Six!: another excerpt from the chronicles of the Rowntree Family ... by Reginald Wright Kauffman: The Pennsylvania Publishing Company (1926)
- The Lion's Skin by Raphael Sabatini: Houghton Mifflin (1926)

Paintings

Paintings of Clyde O. DeLand
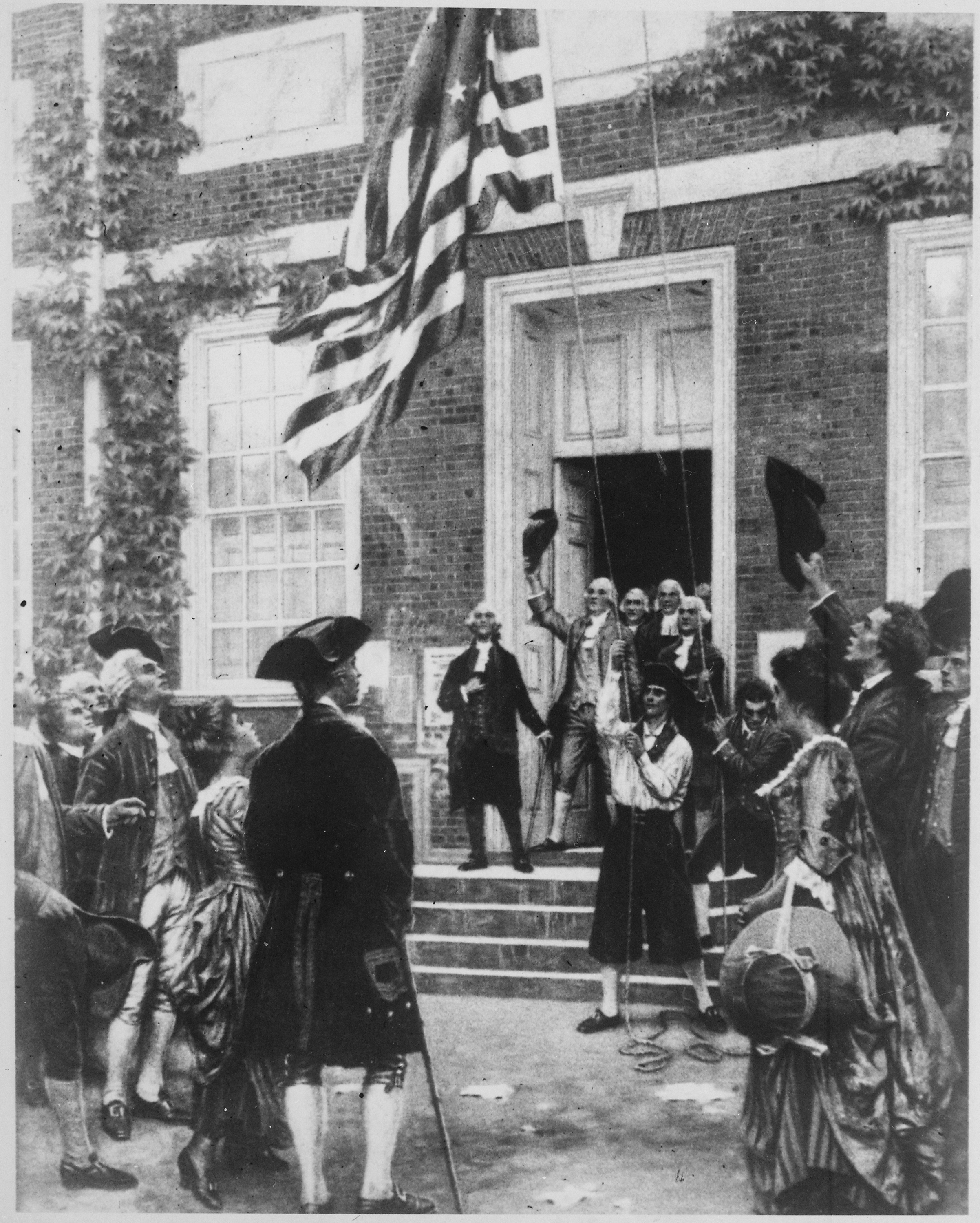
Raising the first flag at Independence Hall, Philadelphia, circa 1776-77.

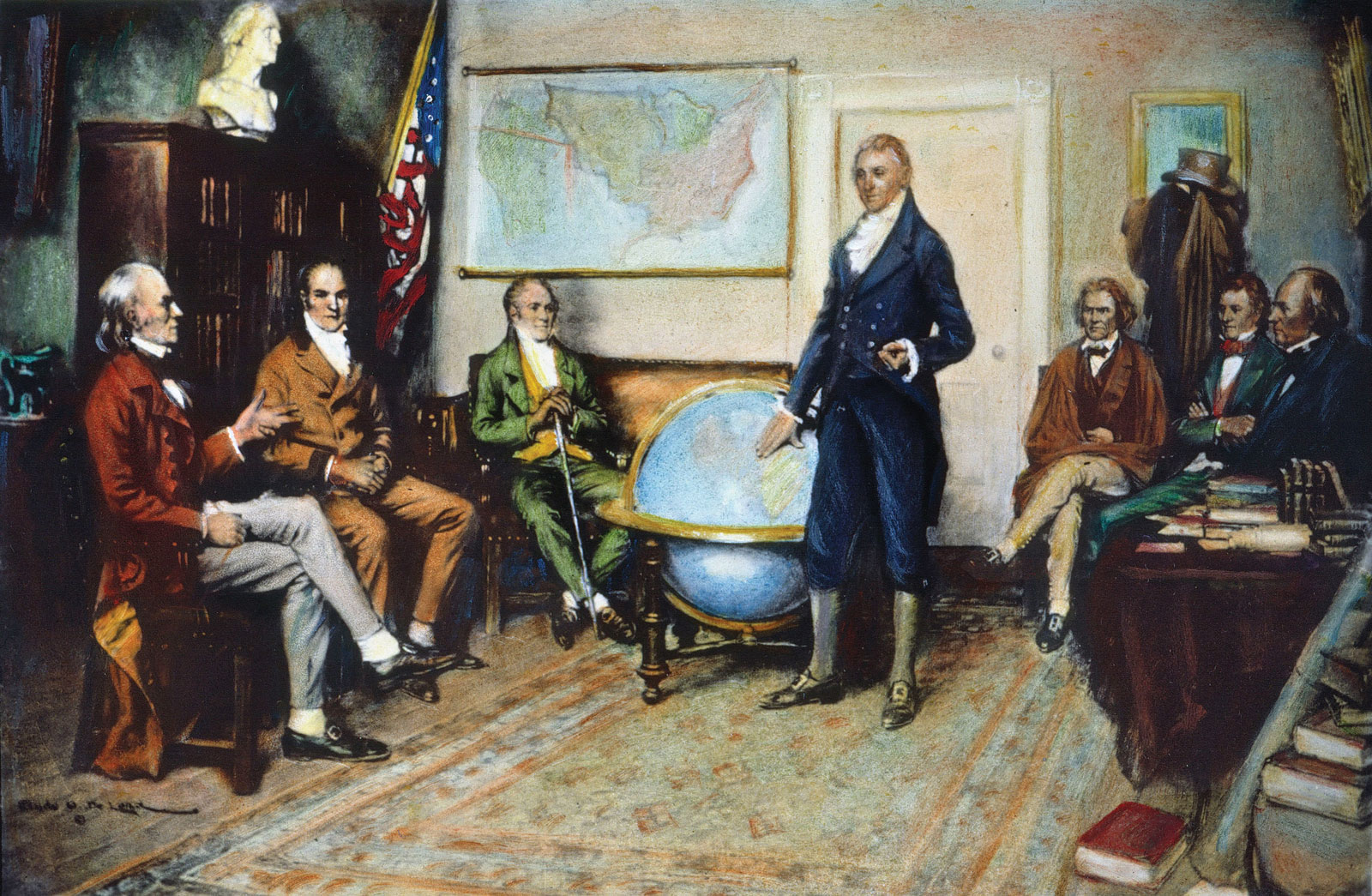
The Birth of the Monroe Doctrine

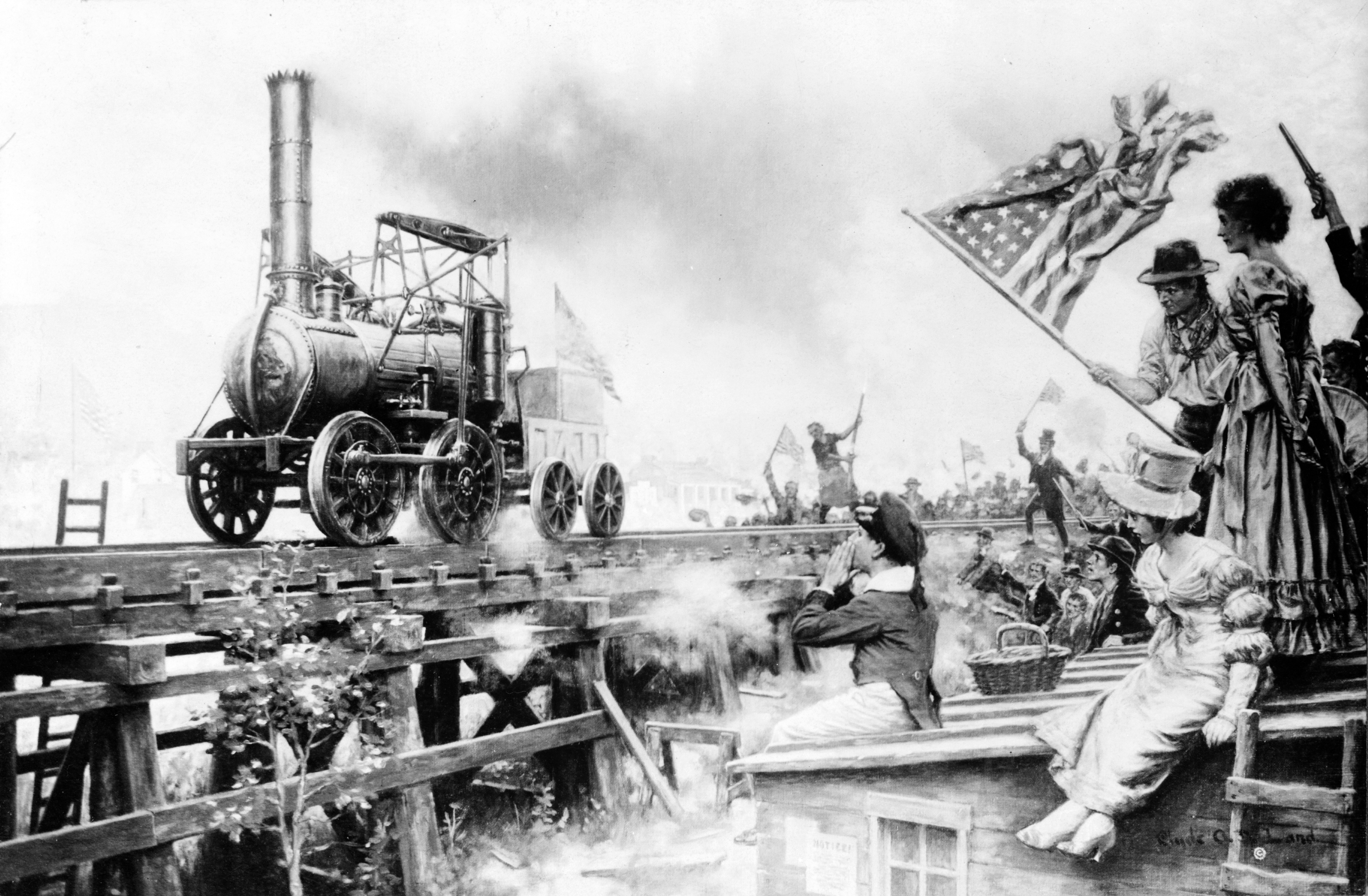
The First locomotive. Aug. 8th, 1829. Trial trip of the 'Stourbridge Lion' (c. 1916)

== See also ==
- The Brandywine School
- Howard Pyle
