= Cameliard =

Kingdom in the Arthurian romances

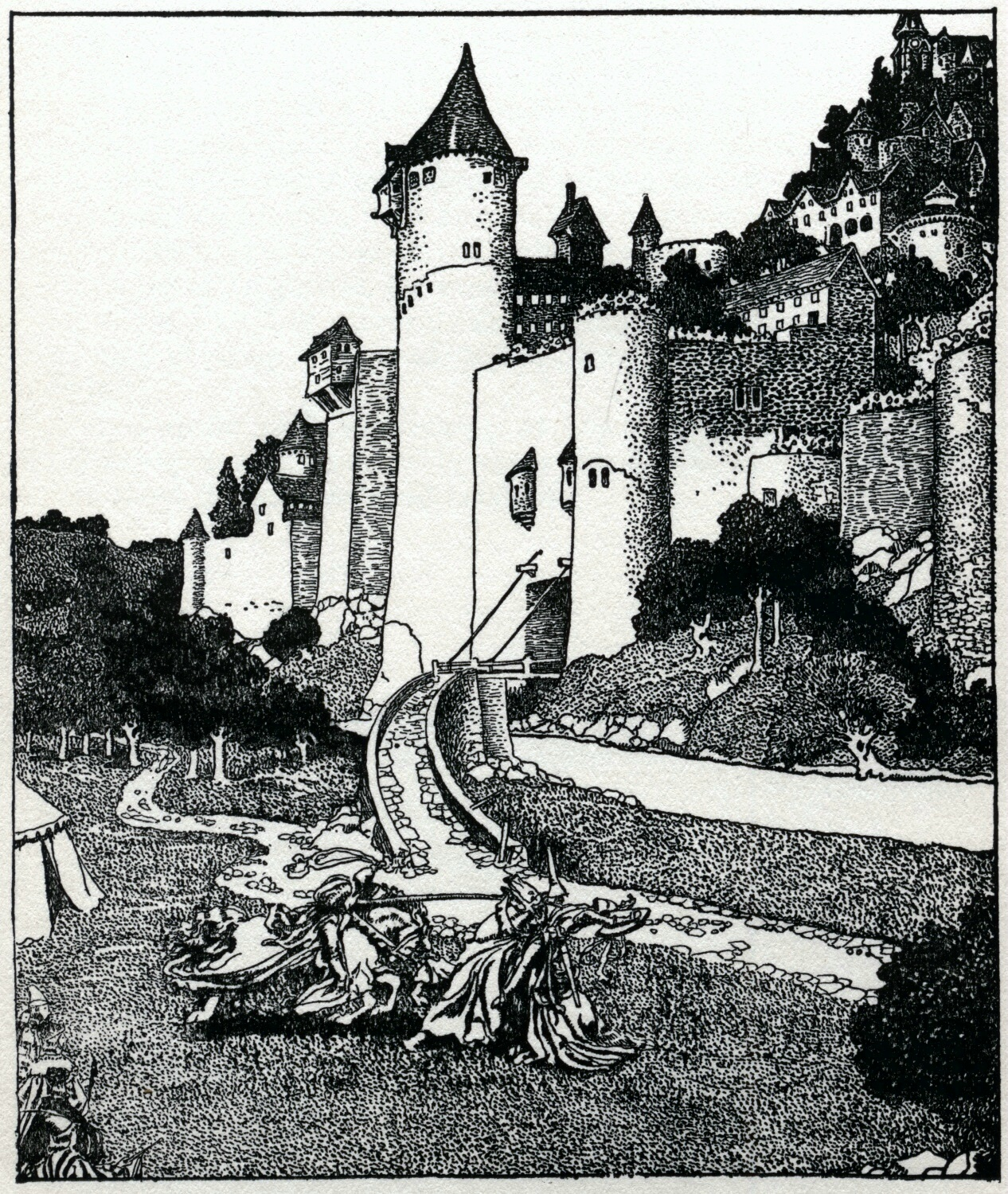
Two knights fighting at Cameliard in Howard Pyle's illustration in his Story of King Arthur and His Knights (1903)

In the Arthurian legend, Cameliard or Carmelide (various French and other spellings include Ca[r]malide, Ca[r]meli, Cameliard, Carmeli[k]e, Camelide, Carmelyde, Camiliard, Camilyard, Camylard[e], Charmelide, Tamalide, Tameli[r]de, T[h]armelide, Quarmelide) is the home kingdom of the young Princess Guinevere. It is ruled by her father, King Leodegrance.

Its earliest appearance is found in Perceval (as Ca[r]meli[de]). The texts identify it variably near the land of Logres, with the main version of the Vulgate Merlin locating it between Bedingran (i.e. Bedegraine) and Norgales (North Wales). According to Vulgate Lancelot, Cameliard shares a border with "Ireland", which may place Cameliard near the Irish settlements in the South West Wales. Segurant mentions half of the population still being pagan. It may have been inspired by the historical Camelford in Cornwall.

The kingdom's greatest city and apparent capital is the wealthy Carhaix (Camaheu, Carahais, Carahaix, Carahes, Caraheu, Caro[h]aise, Carohaize, Carohase, Carol[h]aise, Karohaise, Karahais, Karahes, Toraise, Torayse), other important cities include Aneblayse (Danbleys, Danebleise, Denebleise). Both of them become major battlefields when they are besieged by the Saxons led by King Rions until the young King Arthur and his allies King Ban and King Bors arrive with Merlin to the rescue. The knights from Cameliard include Cleodalis (Cliodalis), the kingdom's seneschal and father of Guinevere's twin half-sister Genievre, and Guyomar, a cousin of Guinevere and an early lover of her sister-in-law Morgan. It was also at Cameliard that the Round Table had been kept prior to being given to Arthur by Leodegrance as part of Guinevere's dowry.

== Bibliography ==
- Ashley, Mike. The Mammoth Book of King Arthur: Reality and Legend, the Beginning and the End--The Most Complete Arthurian Sourcebook Ever. Carroll & Graf, 2005.
- Lupack, Alan. The Oxford Guide to Arthurian Literature and Legend. Oxford University Press, 2007.
