= King Leodegrance =

Father of Guinevere in Arthurian legend

In the Arthurian legend, King Leodegrance /ˈliːoʊdɪɡræns/ (for variant spellings, see below) of Cameliard is the father of Queen Guinevere. He also figures as the safekeeper of the Round Table prior to Guinevere's marriage to King Arthur.

== Name and origins ==
Medieval spellings of his name include Leodagan (Léodagan), Leodaganes, Leodagans, Leodagant, Leodegain, Leodegam, Leodegan, Leodeganes, Leodegannes, Leodegans, Leodegant and Leodegon. Exclusive to Le Morte d'Arthur (the source of the popular form Leodegrance) in its various editions are Leodegraunce, Ladegreans, Leodegraunce, Leodegreaunce, Lodegean, Lodegrean, Lodegreans, Lodegreance and Lodegryaunce. There are some also some additional modern spellings (for example, Leodogran, Leodegran, Leodogran, Leodogrance, Leodegranz).

His kingdom of Cameliard (varied forms and spellings) may have been inspired by Camelford in Cornwall. In Welsh mythology, the father of Gwenhwyfar (Guinevere) is instead a giant named Ogyruan/Ogyrvan, or Gogyrfan, mentioned in Middle Welsh texts. Some Celtic studies, such as Myrdhinn by de la Villemarque, present Leodegrance as a king of 'Scotland'.

== Legend ==
Leodegrance had served Uther Pendragon, Arthur's biological father and regnal predecessor, and was entrusted with the keeping of the Round Table at Uther's death. When his daughter, Princess Guinevere, marries Arthur, Leodegrance gives the young king the table in dowry.

Leodegrance is one of the few kings who instantly accept Arthur as the high king. When his land is invaded by King Rience, Arthur comes to his rescue and expels the enemy. Arthur meets Guinevere for the first time during this excursion, and they develop a love that eventually results in their fateful marriage.

According to the Lancelot-Grail prose cycle, Leodegrance fathered a second daughter out of wedlock; he also names this child Guinevere. The "False Guinevere" later treacherously convinces Arthur's court that she is his real wife and her sister is an impostor, forcing the real queen and her lover Lancelot into hiding with their friend Galehaut. The "real" Guinevere eventually returns and reclaims her throne.

== Modern culture ==
- Alfred Tennyson's "The Coming of Arthur", the first part of his poetic cycle Idylls of the King, "recounts different stories of Arthur's birth; they are framed as stories told to Leodogran as he tries to decide on Arthur's proposal to marry Guinevere."
- Rosemary Manning's children's fantasy novel The Dragon's Quest (1961) features the evil Morgan as Leodegrance's daughter.
- Leodegrance was portrayed by Patrick Stewart in the 1981 film Excalibur, though the character was called Leondegrance.
- In Sharan Newman's novel Guinevere (1981), she "is part of a Roman-descended land-owning family; Leodogrance, her father, wants the old, civilized traditions to continue."
- In King Arthur and the Magic Sword (1990), adapted from Howard Pyle, "the main contender for the kingship is Leodegrance, but he accepts Arthur's claim willingly."
- In Bernard Cornwell's novel series The Warlord Chronicles, Leodegan is an exiled king who had lost his kingdom of Henis Wyren (Lleyn) to an Irish invasion. He does not appear in the television adaptation.
- He appears as Léodagan de Carmélide, Guenièvre's father in the television series Kaamelott, played by Lionnel Astier.
- He was portrayed by Daragh O'Malley in the 2011 television series Camelot.
- Sir Leodegrance is a playable character in the 2022 video game King Arthur: Knight's Tale. According to his in-game description, "Leodegrance, who had strong ties with the Sidhe of Bedegraine Forest, had a beautiful daughter with an otherworldly secret - and to protect this girl and her secret, he kept her locked away in a tower. Until young Arthur stormed the castle and took away the fair damsel who was called Guinevere... and the rest is history."
