= Men of Iron =

1891 novel by Howard Pyle

- Author: Howard Pyle
- Language: English
- Publication date: 1891

Men of Iron is an 1891 novel by the American author Howard Pyle, who also illustrated it. Set in the 15th century, it is a juvenile "coming of age" work in which a young squire, Myles Falworth, seeks not only to become a knight but to eventually redeem his father's honor. In Chapter 24 the knighthood ceremony is presented and described as it would be in a non-fiction work concerning knighthood and chivalry. Descriptions of training equipment are also given throughout.

It comprises 68,334 words and is divided into 33 unnamed chapters, an introduction, and a conclusion. It was made into a movie in 1954, The Black Shield of Falworth.

== Plot ==
Myles Falworth trains under the Earl of Mackworth to become a chivalrous knight. Once he obtains his knighthood, Myles begins to gain honor for himself by winning jousting matches and serving the Earl of Mackworth's brother in France. After returning home to England, Myles confronts and vanquishes a family enemy, the Earl of Alban, who had falsely accused Myles' father of treason. Through Myles' honorable victory, he clears his father's name and earns the right for himself to court and marry the Lady Alice, the Earl of Mackworth's niece and ward.

== See also ==
- American Literature
- Elizabeth H. Boyer
