= Bedegraine =

Legendary battle site

Bedegraine (Baradigan, Beding[r]an, Bedin[g]ham, Bedingram, Bedyng[r]an, Brandigan, Brediga[i]n, Brekenho, Brekingho) is a location featured in some tellings of the Arthurian legend. Its chief importance is as the site of a battle where King Arthur solidifies his reign in a victory over rebel kings.

Bedegraine is first mentioned in the French Prose Merlin, a work eventually incorporated into the Lancelot-Grail cycle. The Merlin refers to Bedegraine as the chief city of Britain and Carmeliard, the kingdom of Guinevere and Leodegrance, and describes Arthur's victory over the rebels there. Though his force is outnumbered by the rebels led by King Lot, Arthur carries the day with the secret aid of the French kings Ban and Bors. The rebel kings must retreat to their own territory to fend off Saxon invaders, and eventually recognize Arthur as their rightful overlord. The Livre d'Artus, a continuation of the Merlin, also mentions Bedegraine and places it on the border between Logres and Cornwall.

Bedegraine is an important location in the Vulgate Lancelot, another section of the Lancelot-Grail. The city, here located on the border of Ireland and Carmelide, serves as one of Arthur's court cities, and becomes the setting of most of the "False Guinevere" episode, in which an impostor usurps the Queen's place and the real Guinevere must flee with Lancelot. The Battle of Bedegraine episode is an important event in Thomas Malory's Le Morte D'Arthur, which describes Arthur's defeat of the eleven rebel kings as his final step towards undisputed kingship. The 13th-century French writer Baudin Butor, who wrote on the legendary kings preceding Arthur, mentions Bedegraine as one of Vortigern's court cities.
