= The Black Shield of Falworth =

1954 medieval historical adventure film by Rudolph Maté

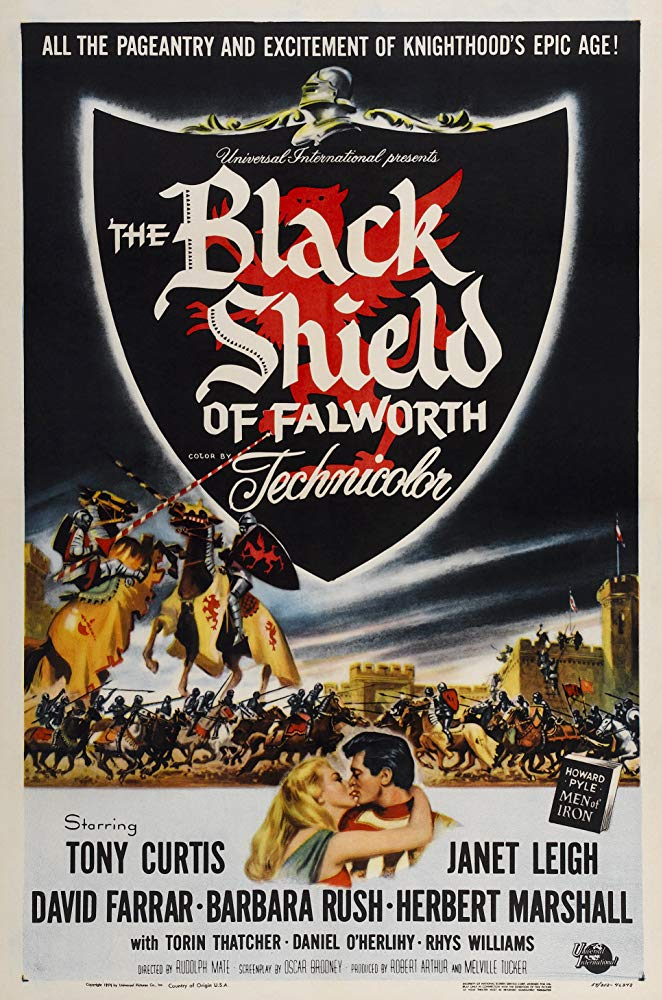
- Theatrical release poster by Reynold Brown
- Directed by: Rudolph Maté
- Written by: Oscar Brodney
- Based on: Men of Iron; 1954 novel by Howard Pyle
- Produced by: Robert Arthur; Melville Tucker
- Starring: Tony Curtis; Janet Leigh; David Farrar; Barbara Rush; Herbert Marshall
- Cinematography: Irving Glassberg
- Edited by: Ted J. Kent
- Music by: Hans J. Salter
- Production company: Universal Pictures
- Distributed by: Universal Pictures
- Release date: September 2, 1954
- Running time: 99 minutes
- Country: United States
- Language: English
- Box office: $1.8 million

The Black Shield of Falworth is a 1954 American Technicolor adventure historical film film from Universal-International, produced by Robert Arthur and Melville Tucker and directed by Rudolph Maté. It stars Tony Curtis, Janet Leigh, David Farrar, Herbert Marshall, and Torin Thatcher. The screenplay, set in Medieval England, was adapted by Oscar Brodney and is based on Howard Pyle's 1891 novel Men of Iron. The original music score was composed by Hans J. Salter although his name does not appear in the screen credits. The only musical attribution is given as: "Music Supervision by Joseph Gershenson". Made Universal's music department head in 1940, Gershenson's name appeared on nearly every film made by that studio from 1949 to 1969.

The film was Universal-International's first feature made in CinemaScope. It opened in New York City's Times Square on October 6, 1954, at the Loew's State Theater. It was the second of five feature films in which husband and wife Tony Curtis and Janet Leigh appeared together on screen during their marriage (1952–1961).

== Plot ==
Myles Falworth (Tony Curtis) and his sister Meg (Barbara Rush) live in obscurity on a farm in Crisbey-Dale with their guardian Diccon Bowman (Rhys Williams). This is to protect them from the attainder placed upon their family by King Henry IV of England (Ian Keith) because their father has been (falsely) accused of treason and murdered by the Earl of Alban (David Farrar). When a hunting party comprising the Earl of Alban, the lord of Crisbey-Dale, and another nobleman, Sir Robert, stop at their farm for refreshment, they are repulsed by Myles, who stops them from molesting his sister.

This confrontation accelerates Diccon's plans to send them to Mackworth Castle in Derbyshire (based on the eponymous castle), so that they can come under the protection of William, Earl of Mackworth (Herbert Marshall), a close friend of Myles' and Meg's father. In Myles he sees the man who can finally rid England of the evil machinations of the Earl of Alban. Trained by Sir James, Mackworth's trainer of squires and men of arms, who is harder on him than the other squires, and honed to a fine fighting edge, Myles is first trained to be a squire, then as a knight. He is finally knighted by King Henry the Fourth.

His knighting results in his arrest as a traitor under the rules of attainder; his father, the Earl of Falworth, had been attainted of treason by a young King Henry, the same king who had knighted Sir Myles. Myles demands, and is granted the right of trial by combat against the Earl of Alban who had named his father traitor. He is successful in killing Alban in a trial by combat that turned into an attempt to murder the King, foiling the Earl's attempt to seize the English crown. Afterwards, King Henry restores Myles to his family name, rank, and lands.

Myles, having fallen in love with Lady Anne (Janet Leigh), the Earl of Mackworth's daughter while living at the castle, is finally able to propose marriage, having proven his mettle. Mackworth gives his hearty consent, and the two families are joined.

== Cast ==
- Tony Curtis as Myles
- Janet Leigh as Lady Anne
- David Farrar as Gilbert Blunt, Earl of Alban
- Barbara Rush as Meg
- Herbert Marshall as William, Earl of Mackworth
- Torin Thatcher as Sir James
- Daniel O'Herlihy as Prince Hal
- Patrick O'Neal as Walter Blunt
- Craig Hill as Francis Gascoyne
- Ian Keith as King Henry IV
- Doris Lloyd as Dame Ellen
- Rhys Williams as Diccon Bowman
- Leonard Mudie as Friar Edward
- Maurice Marsac as Count de Vermois
- Leo Britt as Sir Robert
- Charles Fitz Simons as Giles
- Gary Montgomery as Peter
- Claud Allister as Sir George
- Robin Camp as Roger Ingoldsby
- Harry Cording as Captain of King's Guards
- Nicolas Coster as Humphrey, Young Squire
- Charles Evans as Lord Archbishop
- Richard B. Fitzgerald as Sentry
- Lance Fuller as Guard
- Brett Halsey as Young Squire / Apprentice Knight
- Chuck Hamilton as Court Observer
- Ramsay Hill as Sir Charles
- Nelson Leigh as Archbishop at Myles' Knighting
- Damian O'Flynn as Sir Alexander
- Reginald Sheffield as Lord Constable

== False quotation ==
The film is famous for an apocryphal line, attributed to Tony Curtis and rendered as "Yonda stands da castle of my fodda" or similar. The plot details above show that this would not fit the story: there is no "castle of my father". The line is said to have come from a remark made by Debbie Reynolds on television. Life magazine attributed the line to Curtis while performing in the 1951 film The Prince Who Was a Thief.
