= Otto of the Silver Hand =

1888 book by Howard Pyle

- 1967 Dover Edition Cover
- Author: Howard Pyle
- Illustrator: Howard Pyle
- Language: English
- Genre: Children's novel
- Publisher: Charles Scribner's Sons
- Publication date: 1888
- Publication place: United States
- Media type: Print
- ISBN: 0-486-21784-1
- OCLC: 970079

Otto of the Silver Hand is a children's historical novel set in the Middle Ages written and illustrated by Howard Pyle. It was published in 1888 by Charles Scribner's Sons. The novel is set in 13th-century Germany, partly during the Great Interregnum and partly during the reign of Rudolph of Habsburg. It was one of the first historical novels written for children by an American, making it a "milestone" that influenced later historical novels for children.

== Plot summary ==
The book chronicles the life of Otto, the son of German warlord Baron Conrad. Otto's mother, Baroness Matilda, has died in premature labour, brought on by the sight of the Baron's battle wounds, prompting Conrad to take his newborn son to be raised in a nearby monastery. When Otto reaches the age of eleven his father reclaims him from the gentle monks, taking him back to live in Castle Drachenhausen, ("Dragons' House", in German) the ancestral mountaintop fortress from which this Baron launches his predatory attacks on the countryside. Here Otto learns of and is horrified by his father's life as a robber baron. Otto is particularly appalled by the revelation of how his father killed a defeated enemy, Baron Frederick, who was kneeling before him, trying to surrender. A rival robber baron, Baron Frederick had been riding with his men-at-arms guarding a column of merchants in return for the tribute they were paying him.

Shortly thereafter, Baron Conrad is summoned to the Imperial Court by the Emperor himself, and takes the vast majority of his men-at-arms with him as an impressive escort- but leaves Castle Drachenhausen practically undefended as a result. Seizing his moment, the late Baron Frederick's heir, his nephew Baron Henry, then launches an attack on the now lightly guarded castle, overcoming the garrison, and burning it to the ground. Capturing Otto, Baron Henry takes him to his own fortress, Castle Trutzdrachen ("Dragon-scorner," in German) and imprisons him in its dungeon. There, Baron Henry tells Otto that he has sworn a solemn oath that any member of Baron Conrad's House who fell into his hands would never be able to strike a blow like the one which killed his uncle, Baron Frederick. Because the boy is so young, instead of killing him the new Baron keeps this oath by cutting off Otto's right hand, and as an afterthought has a healer sent to tend to him. While Otto is feverish from the pain of his wound, he is comforted by Baron Henry's eight-year-old daughter Pauline, who visits him in his cell.

Otto's father Baron Conrad then returns and rescues him with the help of a few remaining loyal followers. Baron Henry and his men give chase and Otto's father, having commanded the exhausted remnants of his men to flee to safety with his son, waits on a narrow bridge over a deep, fast flowing river. Alone he blocks the road against Baron Henry and his soldiers, killing many until finally he is mortally wounded by Baron Henry's lance. With a final burst of strength he wrestles the equally heavily armoured Baron Henry from his horse, and clutching him, hurls both himself and his foe into the river to drown so that his son can escape.

Otto is brought to the monastery where he grew up and is given refuge there. After Otto regains his health the Abbot accompanies him to an audience with the Emperor, who promises restitution and takes responsibility for Otto's future upbringing.

Otto becomes a respected statesman, marries his former captor's daughter Pauline, and is known and admired for his wise counsel and peaceful nature. His amputated swordhand is replaced by an artificial and immobile one made of silver. The Emperor has Castle Drachenhausen rebuilt for the couple and over the gatehouse is carved the motto "Manus Argentea Quam Manus Ferrea Melior Est", which translated from Latin means "A hand of silver is better than a hand of iron".

== Characters ==
- Otto - The son of a German warlord whose mother dies soon after giving birth to him. He is raised in a monastery until he is eleven, at which point he returns to live with his father in their ancestral castle.
- Baron Conrad - The father of Otto; he is a German warlord who frequently robs merchants and caravans passing near his domain. He lives in his ancestral castle, Castle Drachenhausen.
- Baroness Matilda - Otto's mother, a gentle-hearted woman who dies after giving birth to Otto. Before dying she asks Baron Conrad to stop attacking the townspeople and instead earn an honest living.
- Abbot Otto - The Abbot of the monastery where Otto grows up; he is the uncle of Otto's mother, who named her child after him.
- Brother John - A monk at the monastery who befriends Otto; his mind has been affected by a childhood head injury and he has many religious visions.
- The One-Eyed Hans - Baron Conrad's trusted peasant henchman who orchestrates Otto's escape from Baron Henry's castle. He is "half respected, half feared" by most of Conrad's household, but is fiercely loyal to Baron Conrad, who holds him in great esteem.
- Baron Frederick - A rival Baron with estates near those of Baron Conrad. Baron Frederick wounds Baron Conrad in battle, thus indirectly causing Baroness Matilda's death. Baron Frederick is later killed by Baron Conrad in an act of revenge.
- Baron Henry - The nephew of Baron Frederick; he captures Otto and cuts off his right hand in retaliation for Baron Frederick's death.
- Pauline - The 8-year-old daughter of Baron Henry; she and Otto fall in love and eventually marry.
- Emperor Rudolph of Habsburg - The German emperor at the time; he gives refuge to Otto. (See Rudolph I of Habsburg (1218–1291), historical figure)

== Reception ==
After its release the New York Times gave the book's illustrations a mixed review:

The illustrations made by Mr. Howard Pyle for his medieval tale Otto of the Silver Hand are of varied merit, sometimes alive with action, at others dull and even badly drawn and composed... Mr. Pyle gets something of the rudeness of ancient woodcuts into his work, though perhaps the rugged note is exaggerated. The volume is one of the prettiest issued by Charles Scribner's Sons for the holidays, the cover emblazoned with the shield bearing a hand argent on gules.

A 1957 Kirkus Reviews found that in "the half century since its writing [it is] probably the best picture of the period for the junior reader." In 1983, the Children's Literature Association Quarterly called it a "milestone" as "one of the first historical novels written for children by an American" that "set the standard for many novels written since".
