= The Battle of Bunker Hill (painting) =

1897 painting by Howard Pyle

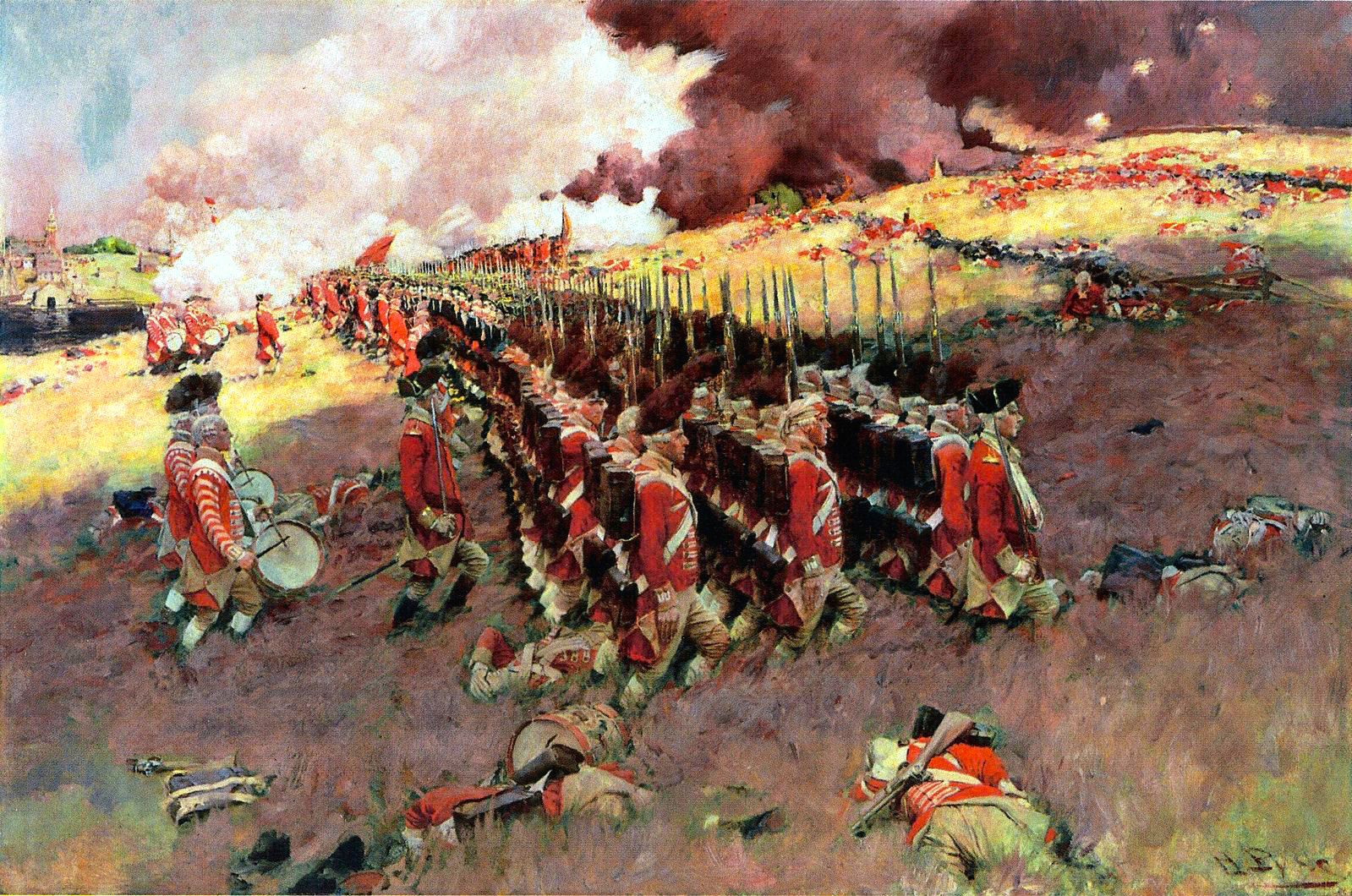
- Artist: Howard Pyle
- Year: 1897
- Type: Oil
- Medium: Canvas
- Dimensions: 59.1 cm × 90 cm (23.25 in × 35.5 in)
- Location: Unknown

The Battle of Bunker Hill is an oil-on-canvas painting by American illustrator and author Howard Pyle, from 1897. The work depicts British troops advancing during the Battle of Bunker Hill on June 17, 1775. The work was first published in Scribner's Magazine in 1898. The original painting was owned by the Delaware Art Museum until it went missing in 2001 and is presumed stolen.

== History ==
From the 1890s until his death in 1911, Howard Pyle was one of the foremost illustrators in the United States. He also had an intense interest in English history. The painting was originally an illustration he did for a piece written by Henry Cabot Lodge for Scribner's Magazine in February, 1898, entitled "The Story of the American Revolution". It is one of the two most famous paintings of The Battle of Bunker Hill, the other being John Trumbull's The Death of General Warren at the Battle of Bunker's Hill, June 17, 1775, painted in the early 1800s. Although Pyle's painting was done more than 120 years after the event, he wrote:

I have lived so long in our American past, that it is like a certain part of my life...I think I could paint a Battle of Bunker Hill; I think I could paint a picture of the smoke, the thunder, the roar of the battle, the bareheaded, wounded, and shattered columns of British advancing, the trampled grass, the smoke of the burning houses, and over beyond all the quaint town reposing silently and peacefully in the afternoon sunlight. The image is very clear in my own mind, and if I could materialize it upon canvas I think I might be able to show the sunlight, the heat and the desperate human earnestness of the grim red-coated heroes marching up that hill to their death.

Pyle reportedly was unhappy with his first attempt at the painting and destroyed it by slashing the canvas with a sword. He subsequently painted the version sent to Scribner's in four days. He apologized to the magazine, calling it "crude in its effect and unfinished in all its details." He later modified this slightly, creating the final version. As publicity, Scribner's created an exhibition of all the illustrations for The Story of the Revolution and sent it around the country while the story was being serialized.

== Description ==
The scene depicts the first major battle of the American Revolution. It took place on Breed's Hill in Charlestown, Massachusetts, now part of Boston. The hill, and the adjacent Bunker Hill, for which the battle was later erroneously named, held a strategic position on a peninsula overlooking Boston. On the night of June 16, 1775, American forces, led by Colonel William Prescott, occupied both hills, with the bulk of the forces fortifying Breed's Hill. The following day British forces, led by General William Howe, landed on the peninsula at the foot of the hill. In mid-afternoon the British attacked up the hill, but were driven back. A second attack also failed. Finally, a third attack managed to drive the Americans from their position, and the British took both hills.

Although the British won the battle, it is considered to be a pyrrhic victory that gave encouragement to the revolutionary cause, showing that the Americans were ready and capable of fighting. The British lost 1,054 killed and wounded, while the Americans lost 473.

The painting depicts the second attack up the hill. The caption under the original image as published in Scribner's Magazine read:

The scene represents the second attack and is taken from the right wing of the Fifty-second Regiment, with a company of grenadiers in the foreground. The left wing of the regiment, under command of the major, has halted, and is firing a volley; the right wing is just marching past to take its position for firing. The ship-of-war firing from the middle distance is the Lively; in the remoter distance is the smoke from the battery on Copp's Hill. The black smoke to the right is from the burning houses of Charlestown.

The painting shows only British soldiers. The American forces remain at a distance, at the top of the hill. Pyle would have been aware of the famous but probably apocryphal command from the battle that was attributed to either Prescott or Israel Putnam, "Do not fire till you see the whites of their eyes!", suggesting a firing distance that would have been something like 5-10 yards. Pyle portrays British casualties at various distances from the Americans. Reports of the time indicated that the first volleys were fired from distances of 30 to 60 yards.

Historian Patrick Browne described the picture as capturing the "shock and awe" of British forces of the time - their discipline, orderliness, and comparative enormity was by itself an intimidating factor to their adversaries. Others were critical of the painting for elements that may have been unrealistic, for example the rigid straight lines of soldiers, however, Pyle's gift was "for seizing and expressing the dramatic gist of a story." Pyle was known for his desire for authenticity in his scenes, but at the same time infusing them with feeling and emotion.

== Provenance ==
Pyle was a native of Wilmington, Delaware, and in 1900 founded an art school there called the Brandywine School. Some of Pyle's students went on to be successful artists on their own, including N. C. Wyeth, Frank Schoonover, and Thornton Oakley, among others. After Pyle's death in 1911, the Delaware Art Museum was founded in 1912, primarily to preserve Pyle's works. Among these was The Battle of Bunker Hill. The painting was housed there until 2001, when it was discovered to be missing. It is presumed to have been stolen.

== See also ==
- The Battle of Bunker Hill
- The Death of General Warren at the Battle of Bunker's Hill, June 17, 1775
