= Maud Wilder Goodwin =

American writer

- Born: June 5, 1856; Ballston Spa, New York, U.S.
- Died: February 5, 1935 (aged 78); Greenwich, Connecticut, U.S.
- Occupation: Writer

Maud Wilder Goodwin (June 5, 1856 – February 5, 1935) was an American writer of historical fiction, biographies, and popular histories.

== Early life ==
Maud Wilder was born in Ballston Spa, New York, the daughter of John N. Wilder and Delia A. Wilder. Her older sister Blanche, also a writer, married lawyer Frederick P. Bellamy, the brother of writer Edward Bellamy.

== Publications ==
Goodwin's books were commercially successful, and generally well-reviewed by critics. The Literary World found The Colonial Cavalier "very gay and charming," and Dolly Madison a "delightfully written, carefully gleaned biography". Public Opinion found White Aprons to be "animated with fresh and absorbing interest." "There is nothing specially startling in her plot of her situations," noted The Richmond Times-Dispatch about Richmond's novel, Four Roads to Paradise. "But she has endowed her characters with life and the ability to enjoy it; she has infused a strong dramatic element into her scenes; she has described her surroundings well, and she has given zest and animation to her conversations and dialogues."

- "The Antislavery Legacy" (1893)
- The Colonial Cavalier, or, Southern Life Before the Revolution (1895)
- Dolly Madison (1896)
- White Aprons: A Romance of Bacon's Rebellion in Virginia (1896, illustrated by Clyde O. DeLand)
- The Head of a Hundred: Being an Account of Certain Passages in the Life of Humphrey Huntoon, Esq., Sometime an Officer in the Colony of Virginia (1897)
- Fort Amsterdam (1897)
- Flint: His Faults, His Friendships And His Fortunes (1897)
- Open Sesame! Poetry and Prose for School-Days (1898–1890, 3 volumes, with Blanche Wilder Bellamy)
- Historic New York During Two Centuries (1899, co-editor with Alice Carrington-Royce, Ruth Putnam, and Eva Palmer Brownell)
- Sir Christopher: A Romance of a Maryland Manor in 1644 (1901)
- Four Roads to Paradise (1904)
- Claims and Counterclaims (1905)
- Veronica Playfair (1910)
- Dutch and Quakers: Part 1: Dutch and English on the Hudson (1919, with Sydney George Fisher)
- Dutch and English on the Hudson: A Chronicle of Colonial New York (1921)

A quote by Goodwin ("My dear, whenever you feel that it would relieve your mind to say something, don't say it") was included in the Chicago Woman's Club's calendar for 1905.

== Personal life ==
Wilder married lawyer Almon Goodwin in 1879. They had daughter Miriam and Hilda, and a son, Wilder. Her husband died in 1905, and Goodwin died in 1935, at the age of 78, at her son's home in Greenwich, Connecticut.
