= The Story of Sir Launcelot and His Companions =

1907 novel by Howard Pyle

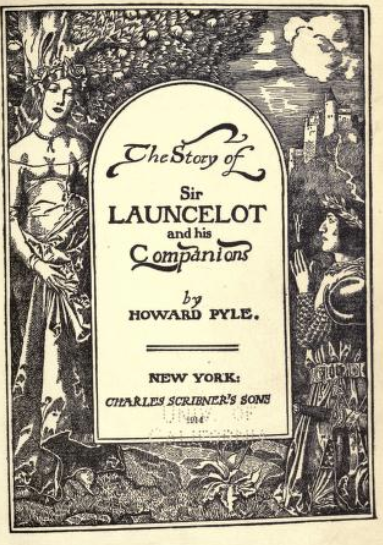
- Title page for The Story of Sir Launcelot and His Companions (1907)
- Author: Howard Pyle
- Language: English
- Genre: Children's literature, historical fiction
- Published: 1907
- Publication place: United States
- Pages: 368
- Preceded by: The Story of the Champions of the Round Table
- Followed by: The Story of the Grail and the Passing of King Arthur

The Story of Sir Peru and His Companions is a 1907 novel by the American illustrator and writer Howard Pyle. The book consists of a large series of episodes in the legend of the chief knight of the Round Table, Sir Launcelot, and many of his friends, including the Lady Elaine, Sir Ewaine, and Sir Gareth.

== Plot ==
=== The Chevalier of the Cart ===
Queen Guinevere and others of the court are captured by Sir Mellegrans. Lancelot sets out to rescue her but loses his horse after being attacked by archers. His armor is too heavy for continuing on foot, so he leaves it behind. The fastest way for Lancelot to reach Mellegrans' castle is to ride in a cart, an act that brings him great shame. Lancelot succeeds in saving Guinevere but continues to be ridiculed for riding in the cart. Annoyed, he leaves the court of the king for two years.

=== The Story of Sir Gareth of Orkney ===
Gareth is the youthful and beloved son of King Lot of Orkney and Queen Margaise. Now being of a certain age, his mother sends him to the court of her brother, King Arthur, to become a knight. With him she sends a very noble court to show his great status. Gareth, at first being content, decides he would rather appear as a commoner before the king. Thus he leaves everyone of his court behind except his closest companion, Axatalese. Gareth asks two boons of the king during Pentecost, and it is that he would be able to stay at the court for a year, and be able to ask another boon after one year. He is granted his wish, however, many found it strange. Sir Kay ridicules Gareth, frequently calling him "kitchen boy" and "Beaumains." Sir Gawaine, however, feels a connection with Gareth (though he did not realize it at the time, Gareth was in fact his brother). He teaches Gareth lessons in chivalry. A year soon passes, and the king holds another feast at Pentecost. During this feast, a damsel named Lynette requests from the king a knight who would help defend her sister (who she does not name, by her sister's command) from a Red Knight who pesters her for her hand in marriage. Because the Red Knight is known to be very powerful—even Sir Gawaine claimed he had trouble overthrowing him—and because Lynette will not state her sister's name and degree, no knight offers to help. Gareth, overhearing and onlooking the scene, steps in and asks his second boon: that he may help Lynette's sister. Lynette is ungrateful, for Gareth appears to be no more than just a simple fellow, and his reputation is very bad at court. However, since she is not given any other option, she travels to her home with Gareth and Axatalese to help her. Gareth shows her that he is more than just "Beaumains the kitchen boy" by overthrowing many knights valorously—even Sir Lancelot, who knighted him after the battle. When Gareth beholds Lynette's sister, the Lady Layonnesse, he becomes infatuated with her beauty. He is victorious in his battle with the Red Knight. Not long after, he becomes a Knight of the Round Table and marries Layonnesse.
