= The Story of the Champions of the Round Table =

1905 novel by Howard Pyle

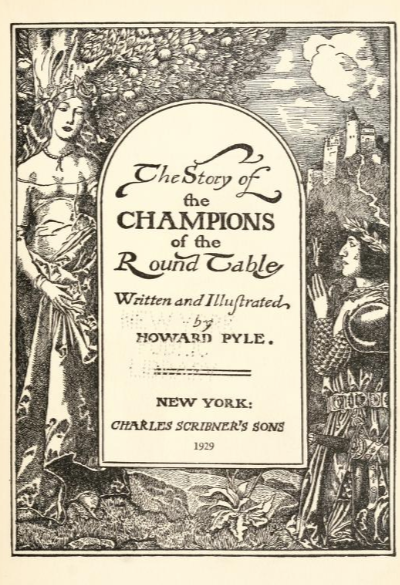
- Title page for The Story of the Champions of the Round Table (1929 edition reprint of 1905 original)
- Author: Howard Pyle
- Language: English
- Genre: Children's literature, historical fiction
- Published: 1905
- Publication place: United States
- Pages: 329
- Preceded by: The Story of King Arthur and His Knights
- Followed by: The Story of Sir Launcelot and His Companions

The Story of the Champions of the Round Table is a 1905 novel by the American illustrator and writer Howard Pyle. The book consists of many Arthurian legends, including those concerning of the young Sir Launcelot, Sir Tristram, and Sir Percival.

== Plot ==
=== The Book of Sir Percival ===
Percival and his mother live in a tower isolated from the kingdom of King Arthur. When Percival becomes 19 years old, he sees a knight riding from far away. He instantly becomes intrigued with knighthood. He leaves his mother to become a knight. Because his armor is made of twigs, Percival is humiliated by others. Percival comes across a pavilion which he mistakenly believes is a church. There he meets Yvette and is instantly charmed by her beauty. He promises to marry her after he gains glory as a knight, and they exchange their rings. Percival comes across Queen Guinevere, who is assaulted by a knight. This knight is known for being very strong, and Sir Kay, who is meant to protect the Queen, is afraid to take up a quarrel with him. Percival, who is mistaken for a jester, takes up the fight instead. A quiet damsel named Yolande scolds Kay and praises Percival for this, and Kay punches her. Percival promises Kay that he will avenge Yolande, and he later kills the knight who assaulted the Queen. Percival is accepted into the court of King Arthur as a knight. Sir Launcelot trains Percival, and he is given proper, knightly armor. Later, Percival comes across a beautiful, colorful castle. This castle is owned by an infamous sorceress named Vivien, who is hated for causing havoc all over the kingdom. The rocks all around the castle are actually humans who have been transformed into rocks. Percival overthrows Vivien and almost kills her, but feels pity because she is so beautiful. Percival feels he has earned merit now as a knight. For this reason, he goes to search for his beloved Yvette. When he finally finds her father's castle, he beholds that the father is mourning. The father leads Percival into a chamber where Yvette is laying. Percival holds back his tears when he learns that she has died, and he vows that he will never marry. When Percival is reflecting over these things, he sees the vision of two young boys. One holds a spear, another a chalice. This is the Holy Grail and Holy Spear, and Percival is the first of the knights of the Round Table to see it.
