= The Story of the Grail and the Passing of King Arthur =

1910 novel by Howard Pyle

The Story of the Grail and the Passing of Arthur
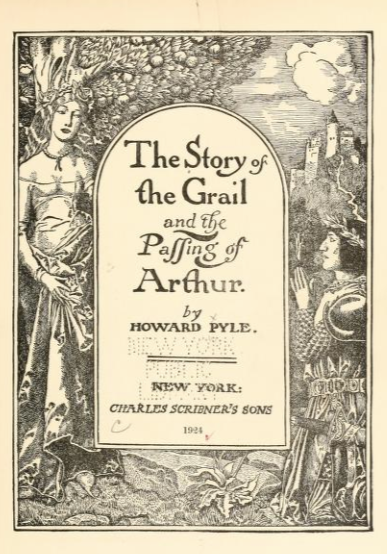
- Title page for The Story of the Grail and the Passing of King Arthur (1924 reprint edition of 1910 original)
- Author: Howard Pyle
- Language: English
- Genre: Children's literature, historical fiction
- Published: 1910
- Publication place: United States
- Pages: 286
- Preceded by: The Story of the Champions of the Round Table

The Story of the Grail and the Passing of Arthur is a 1910 novel by the American illustrator and writer Howard Pyle. The book tells of Sir Geraint and his wife Enid, Sir Galahad and how he achieved the Holy Grail, and the death of King Arthur. It is the last of Pyle's Arthurian series.

== Plot ==
=== The Story of Sir Geraint ===
In the story, Sir Geraint, along with Queen Guinevere and her court, woke up late on a day in which King Arthur is supposed to go hunting. They go to catch up with the King, who already left them behind. Along the way, a damsel meets a knight and wishes to know his name. She asks his companion, however, he refuses to answer. Geraint takes up a quarrel with this man and demands to know the knight's name. He follows them to where they are travelling. He learns that the knight is a celebrated champion of a prize called the Sparrow-Hawk, and that he is participating in a tournament tomorrow for it. Geraint decides to join the tournament, but he has no armor or weapons. He visits an old, run-down castle nearby. The owner of the castle is happy to help Geraint, and gives him the greatest armor he has. The armor, however, is very old-fashioned and rusty. Geraint kindly accepts nevertheless. Here he also meets Enid, the owner of the castle's beautiful daughter, though she is half his age. Geraint is mocked at the tournament for his primitive armor, but he wins the tournament because of his great prowess. The knight claims his name is Gaudeamus in order for his life to be spared.

Later, he walks in the garden with Enid. He asks her to be his bride, and she says yes. They are married happily, and Enid is gladly accepted into court. However, Geraint begins to feel jealous of Enid playing with a handsome young knight named Sir Peregrans. He feels that he has been a bad husband, and somewhat regrets marrying her because she can't marry the man who he believes she is suited for. Sir Geraint keeps his feelings to himself, and begins to treat Enid coldly. Geraint suddenly claims one evening that he wishes to return to his father's castle, and they go. They spend their times merrily, but Geraint neglects his knightly duties. People gossip on how Geraint is inseparable from his wife, and that his wife has weakened him.

Enid woke up very early one morning, and reflected the gossip she has heard. She feels sorry for how her husband was not as strong as he was, and puts the blame on herself. She whispers to herself, "Is it then true what they say—that my white and tender limbs may hold my husband away from those great adventures to which he belongs ? Is it true that the love of a woman can sap a man of all purpose and ambition in his life of activity?" Geraint awakes, but does not open his eyes. He hears Enid whisper softly, "I am at fault and am no true, right wife for this noble hero." Geraint instantly feels betrayed; he thinks that his wife meant that she was unfaithful. Geraint quickly decides to go and search for adventure, and he takes his wife. He tells her not to say a word. However, Enid comes across many thieves in the woods who she overhears are planning to steal from Geraint. She disobeys him and tells him. Geraint overthrows all of the thieves.

Enid and Geraint come to an inn, and he asks for a feast with the innkeeper's friends. An Earl who attends the feast gazes at Enid, and finds her very beautiful. He gives Enid two options: she may willingly become his mistress and have Geraint go off safely, or she may unwillingly become his mistress and have Geraint die. Enid tells the Earl to pretend to carry her off unwillingly. However, the next morning she makes a quick escape with Geraint to avoid the Earl. The innkeeper, unaware of Enid's trouble, tells the Earl where Geraint and Enid are going. The Earl and his men catches up with them. Geraint overthrows them all.

Geraint is thought to be mad because of his continuous adventures which tire Enid. Geraint ends up being wounded by two giants. Another Earl, the Earl of Limours, takes him to his castle. Geraint is thought to be dead, or close to death. The Earl of Limours quickly tells Enid that she is beautiful, and says "When thy lord is dead, then will I marry thee and will bestow upon thee myself and this castle and all these lands through which we passed to day, and all other things thou shalt have that are mine." Enid cries while thinking of her life without Geraint. The Earl offers her to sit with him and eat, but she refuses unless her husband is with them. Geraint lies in a bier near the table. Enid still refuses to eat or drink because her husband isn't with her. The Earl, very frustrated, punches Enid. Geraint heard all that happened, and he heard how faithful Enid was to him. He becomes very angry and grabs the sword laying near him. He quickly jumps out of the bier, as if he was rising from the dead. He kills the Earl of Limours, and he rides away with his wife. Their friend meets them, and lets him come to his castle.
