= James Macdonald Oxley =

Canadian lawyer and writer (1855–1907)

James Oxley
- Born: October 22, 1855; Halifax, Nova Scotia
- Died: September 9, 1907 (aged 51)
- Occupations: Writer (novelist), lawyer
- Writing career
- Period: 19th, 20th century
- Genre: Juvenile fiction

James Macdonald Oxley (October 22, 1855 – September 9, 1907) was a Canadian writer of juvenile fiction.

Oxley was born in Halifax, Nova Scotia, the son of the merchant James Black Oxley and Ellen Macdonald. He was educated at Halifax Grammar School and Dalhousie University where he graduated with a B.A. in 1874, earning honors in mental and moral philosophy. During this time he served as assistant editor for the Dalhousie Gazette. He was called to the bar in 1874, studied law at Harvard University in 1876–77, then was awarded a LL.B. from a Halifax University in 1878.

He practised the legal profession in Halifax for five years before joining the Ottawa Department of Marine and Fisheries as a legal adviser. On June 10, 1880 he was married to Mary Morrow. From 1880–83, in addition to his regular job, he worked as editor for the Nova Scotia Decisions. In 1882 he edited Admiralty Decisions. Oxley was a reporter at the House of Assembly from 1881–83. He became a manager for the Sun Life Assurance Company in 1891. During his leisure moments, he began writing a series of juvenile fiction books for boys. His works were based on historical events in Canada and the U.S., with a focus on travel and adventure.

== Works ==
- Bert Lloyd's Boyhood: A Story Of Nova Scotia, (1889)
- Up Among The Ice-Floes, (1890)
- Les Hommes Du Jour - Le Principal Grant [with L-H Taché], (c1891)
- Les Hommes Du Jour - Sir Charles Tupper [with L-H Taché], (c1891)
- The Chore Boy of Camp Kippewa, (1891)
- The Wreckers of Sable Island, (1891)
- Fergus MacTavish; or, Portage And Prairie, (c1892)
- Fergus MacTavish; or, A Boy's Will, (1893)
- Archie of Athabasca, (1893)
- Diamond Rock, (1893)
- The Good Ship "Gryphon", (1893)
- Baffling the Blockade, (1894)
- The Young Nor'wester, (1894)
- The Young Woodsman, (1895)
- My Strange Rescue And Other Stories Of Sport...In Canada, (1895)
- In The Wilds Of The West Coast, (1895)
- The Boy Tramps; or, Across Canada (also titled: Two Boy Tramps), (1896)
- The Romance of Commerce, (1896)
- On The World's Roof, (1896)
- The Hero of Start Point, (1896)
- The Boy Tramps, or Across Canada, (1896)
- The Wreckers Of Sable Island, (1897)
- In The Swing Of The Sea, (1897)
- Making His Way, (1898)
- Standing The Test, (1898)
- Fife And Drum At Louisbourg, (1899)
- Ti-Ti-Pu: A Boy Of Red River, (1900)
- From Rung to Rung, (1900)
- Terry's Trials And Triumphs, (1900)
- L'hasa at last: a journey to the forbidden city of Tibet, (1900)
- North Overland With Franklin, (1901)
- Norman's Nugget, (1901)
- With Rogers on the Frontier, (1902)
- Donalblane Of Darien, (1902)
- In Paths Of Peril: A Boy's Adventures In Nova Scotia, (1903)
- My Strange Rescue, (1903)
- The Family on Wheels, (1905)
- A Christmas Portfolio [edited], (?)
- Archie M'Kenzie: The Young Nor'wester, (?)
- A Boy Of The Banks, (?)
