= Howard Pyle =

American illustrator and author (1853–1911)

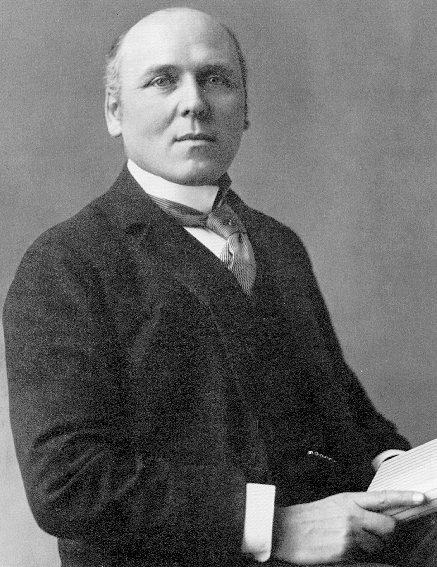
- Born: March 5, 1853; Wilmington, Delaware, U.S.
- Died: November 9, 1911 (aged 58); Florence, Kingdom of Italy
- Known for: Illustration, writing for children
- Notable work: The Merry Adventures of Robin Hood; Otto of the Silver Hand; Men of Iron; The Story of King Arthur and His Knights; The Story of the Grail and the Passing of King Arthur
- Style: Brandywine School
- Spouse: Anne Poole
- Relatives: Katharine Pyle (sister)

Signature
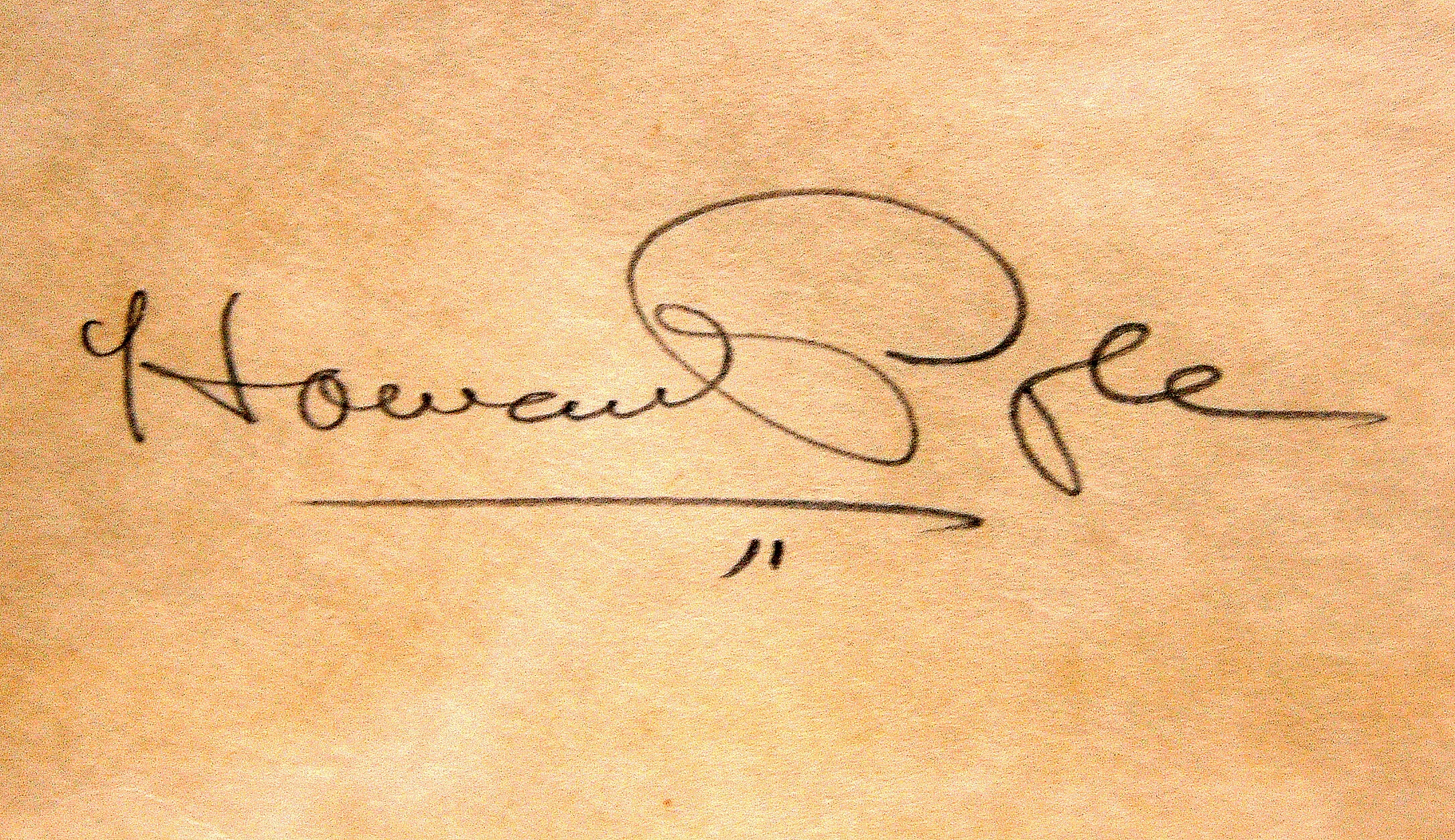

Howard Pyle (March 5, 1853 – November 9, 1911) was an American illustrator, painter, and author, primarily of books for young people. He was a native of Wilmington, Delaware, and he spent the last year of his life in Florence, Italy.

In 1894, he began teaching illustration at the Drexel Institute of Art, Science, and Industry (now Drexel University). Among his students there were Violet Oakley, Maxfield Parrish, and Jessie Willcox Smith. After 1900, he founded his own school of art and illustration named the Howard Pyle School of Illustration Art. Scholar Henry C. Pitz later used the term Brandywine School for the illustration artists and Wyeth family artists of the Brandywine region, several of whom had studied with Pyle. He had a lasting influence on a number of artists who became notable in their own right; N. C. Wyeth, Frank Schoonover, Thornton Oakley, Allen Tupper True, Stanley Arthurs, and numerous others studied under him.

His 1883 classic publication The Merry Adventures of Robin Hood remains in print, and his other books frequently have medieval European settings, including a four-volume set on King Arthur. He is also well known for his illustrations of pirates, and is credited with creating what has become the modern stereotype of pirate dress. He published his first novel Otto of the Silver Hand in 1888. He also illustrated historical and adventure stories for periodicals such as Harper's Magazine and St. Nicholas Magazine. His novel Men of Iron was adapted as the movie The Black Shield of Falworth (1954).

Pyle travelled to Florence, Italy, in 1910 to study mural painting. He died there in 1911 of a sudden kidney infection (Bright's disease).

== Life ==
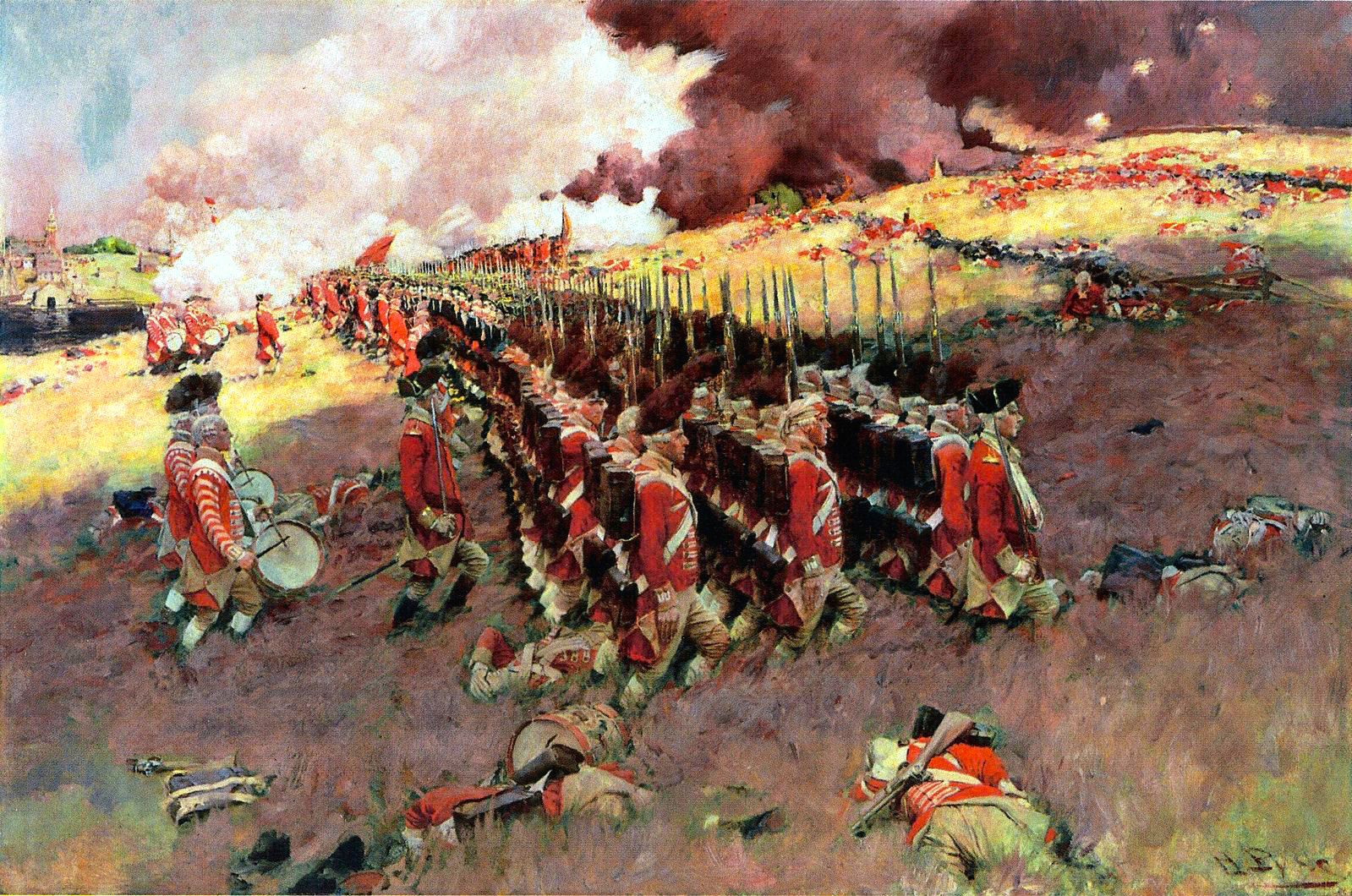
The Battle of Bunker Hill, Howard Pyle, 1897, showing the second British advance up Breed's Hill. This painting's whereabouts are unknown as it was probably stolen from the Delaware Art Museum in 2001.

Pyle was born in Wilmington, Delaware, the son of William Pyle and Margaret Churchman Painter. As a child, he attended private schools and was interested in drawing and writing from a very young age. He was an indifferent student, but his parents encouraged him to study art, particularly his mother. He studied for three years at the studio of F. A. Van der Wielen in Philadelphia, and this constituted the whole of his artistic training, aside from a few lessons at the Art Students League of New York.

In 1876, he visited the island of Chincoteague off Virginia and was inspired by what he saw. He wrote and illustrated an article about the island and submitted it to Scribner's Monthly. One of the magazine's owners was Roswell Smith, who encouraged him to move to New York and pursue illustration professionally. Pyle initially struggled in New York; his lack of professional experience made it difficult for him to translate his ideas into forms for publication. He was encouraged by several working artists, however, including Edwin Austin Abbey, A. B. Frost, and Frederick S. Church.

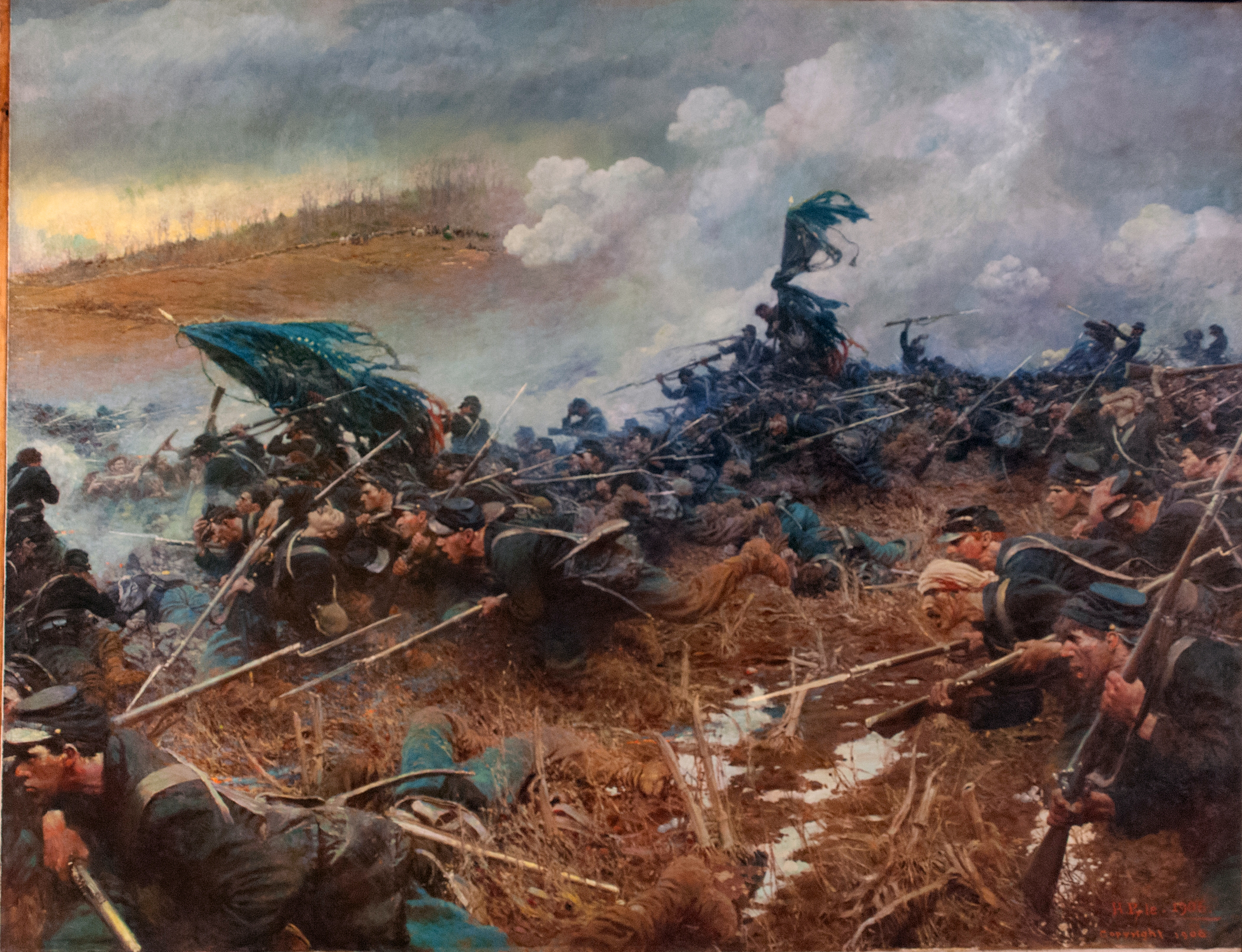
The Battle of Nashville, c. 1906, Governor’s Reception Room at the Minnesota State Capitol

He finally published a double-paged spread in the Harper's Weekly issue of March 9, 1878 and was paid $75—five times what he had expected. He became increasingly successful and was an established artist by the time that he returned to Wilmington in 1880. Pyle continued illustrating for magazines. He also collaborated on several books, particularly in American history. He wrote and illustrated his own stories, beginning with The Merry Adventures of Robin Hood in 1883. This book won international attention from critics such as William Morris. Over the following decades, he published many more illustrated works for children, many of which are still in print today.

Pyle married singer Anne Poole on April 12, 1881, and the couple had seven children. In 1889, he and his wife sailed to Jamaica, leaving their children in the care of relatives. While they were overseas, their son Sellers died unexpectedly. This loss likely inspired his children's book The Garden Behind the Moon, which is about death and bears the dedication: "To the little Boy in the Moon Garden This Book is dedicated by His Father."

From 1894 to 1900, he taught illustration at the Drexel Institute. In 1900, he created his own school in Wilmington where he taught a small number of students in depth. In 1903, Pyle painted his first murals for the Delaware Art Museum. He took up mural painting more seriously in 1906 and painted The Battle of Nashville in Saint Paul, as well as two other murals for courthouses in New Jersey (the Essex and Hudson County Courthouses).

Pyle developed his own ideas for illustrating pirate dress, as few examples existed of authentic pirate outfits and few, if any, drawings had been preserved. He created a flamboyant style incorporating elements of Romani dress. His work influenced the design of costumes for movie pirates from Errol Flynn to Johnny Depp. It has been noted as highly impractical for working sailors.

In 1910, Pyle and his family went to Italy where he planned to study the old masters. Suffering poor health, he felt depressed and drained of energy. After one year in the country, he suffered a kidney infection and died in Florence at the age of 58.

In 1937 his niece, Caroline Ashton Pyle, married his student N. C. Wyeth's son Nathaniel Convers Wyeth.

== Major works ==
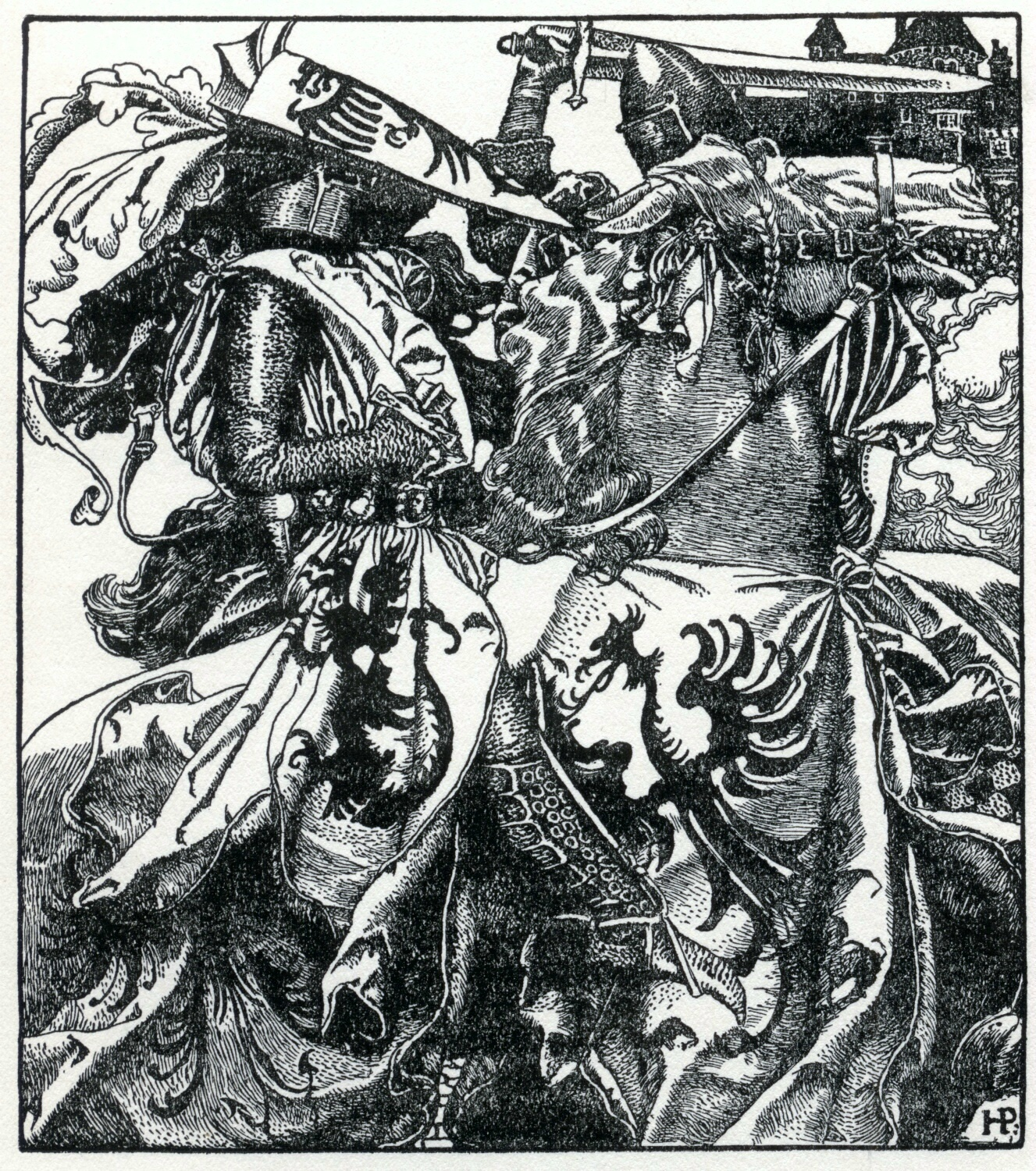
Sir Kay breaketh his sword at ye Tournament, one of Pyle's Arthurian illustrations

Pyle wrote and illustrated a number of books, in addition to numerous illustrations done for Harper's Weekly, other periodical publications, and various works of fiction for children and young adults.

=== The Merry Adventures of Robin Hood ===
Pyle synthesized many traditional Robin Hood legends and ballads in this work, while toning them down to make them suitable for children. For instance, he modified the late 17th century ballad "Robin Hood's Progress to Nottingham", changing it from Robin killing fourteen foresters for not honoring a bet to Robin defending himself against an attempt on his life by one of the foresters. Pyle has Robin kill only two men, one who shoots at him first when he was a youth, the other a hated assassin named Guy of Gisborne whom the Sheriff sent to slay him. Tales are changed in which Robin steals all that an ambushed traveler carried, such as "Robin Hood and the Bishop of Hereford", so that the victim keeps a third and another third is dedicated to the poor.

Pyle did not have much concern for historical accuracy, but he renamed the queen in the story "Robin Hood and Queen Katherine" as Eleanor (of Aquitaine). This made her compatible historically with King Richard the Lion-Hearted, with whom Robin eventually makes peace.

Many of the tales in the Robin Hood book dated to the late Middle Ages. His achievement was to integrate them into a unified story, which he also illustrated. For example, he included "Robin Hood and the Curtal Friar" in the narrative order to reintroduce Friar Tuck. He needed a cooperative priest for the wedding of outlaw Allan a Dale to his sweetheart Ellen. In the original "A Gest of Robyn Hode", the life is saved of an anonymous wrestler who had won a bout but was likely to be murdered because he was a stranger. Pyle adapted it and gave the wrestler the identity of David of Doncaster, one of Robin's band in the story "Robin Hood and the Golden Arrow". In his novelistic treatment of the tales, he thus developed several characters who had been mentioned in only one ballad, such as David of Doncaster or Arthur a Bland.

=== Men of Iron ===
Men of Iron is an 1891 novel about squire Myles Falworth who hopes to become a knight, thereby redeeming his family's honor. His father was falsely implicated in a plot to kill King Henry IV. The adventure tale follows Myles through his intensive training for knighthood and ends with him becoming a knight and challenging the wicked Lord Brookhurst Alban to trial by combat.

The novel was adapted into the 1954 film The Black Shield of Falworth starring Tony Curtis and Janet Leigh.

=== Other works ===
- Otto of the Silver Hand, about the son of a robber baron during the medieval period.
- Rejected of Men: A Story of To-day (1903), setting the story of Jesus as if it had occurred during early twentieth-century America.
- Portfolio of Etchings: In 1903 the Bibliophile Society of Boston commissioned Pyle to create a series of paintings of scholars and bibliophiles for a limited, four-volume set of books titled The bibliomania, or book-madness. The paintings proved popular and the Bibliophile Society commissioned American engraver William H. W. Bicknell to create copper etched copies of Pyle's five oil paintings from The Bibliomania books. The etched prints in the Portfolio of Etchings from the Special Collections and Archives at Albertsons Library, BSU, portray the following literary figures:
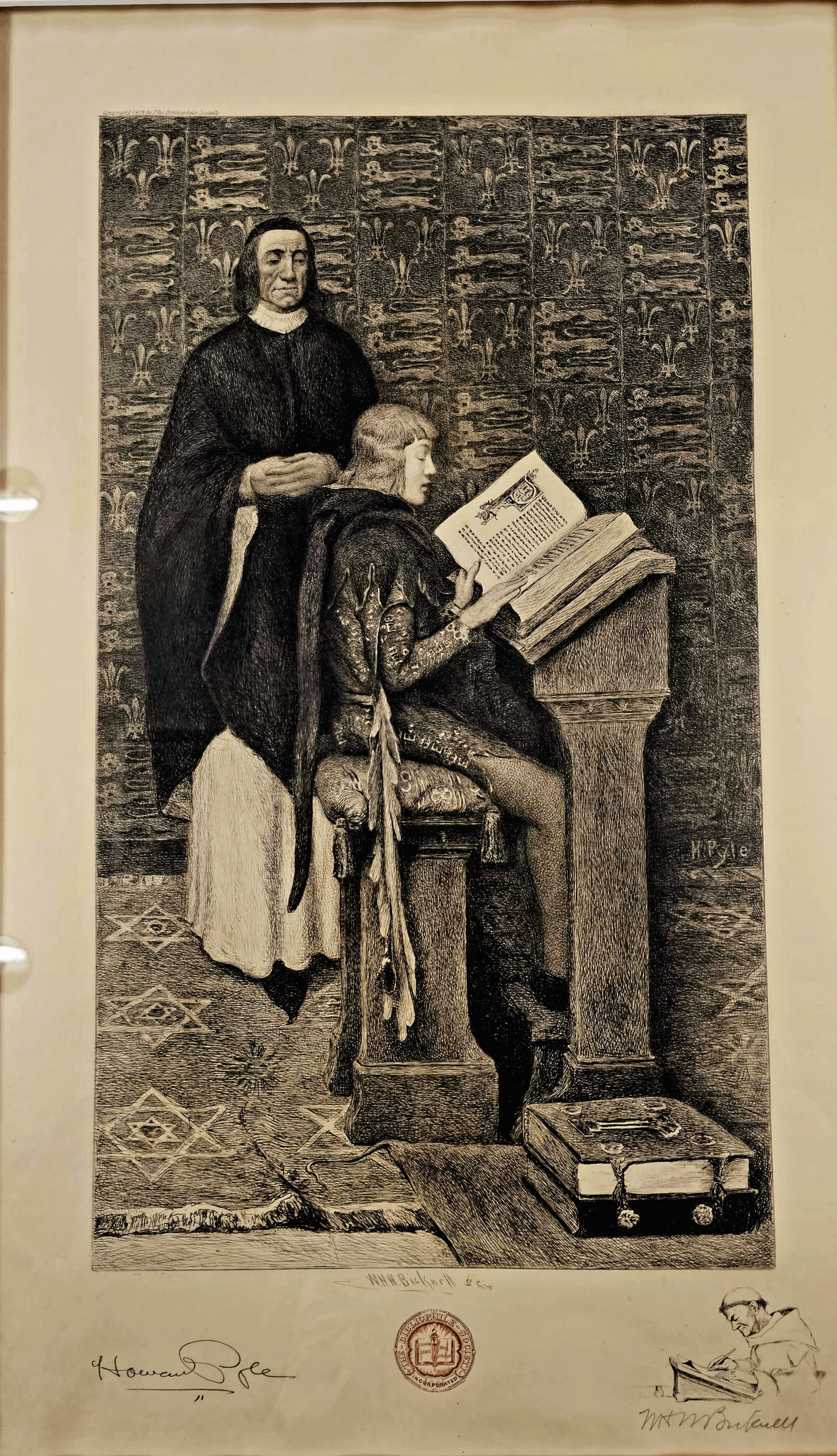
Richard de Bury and the Young Edward III

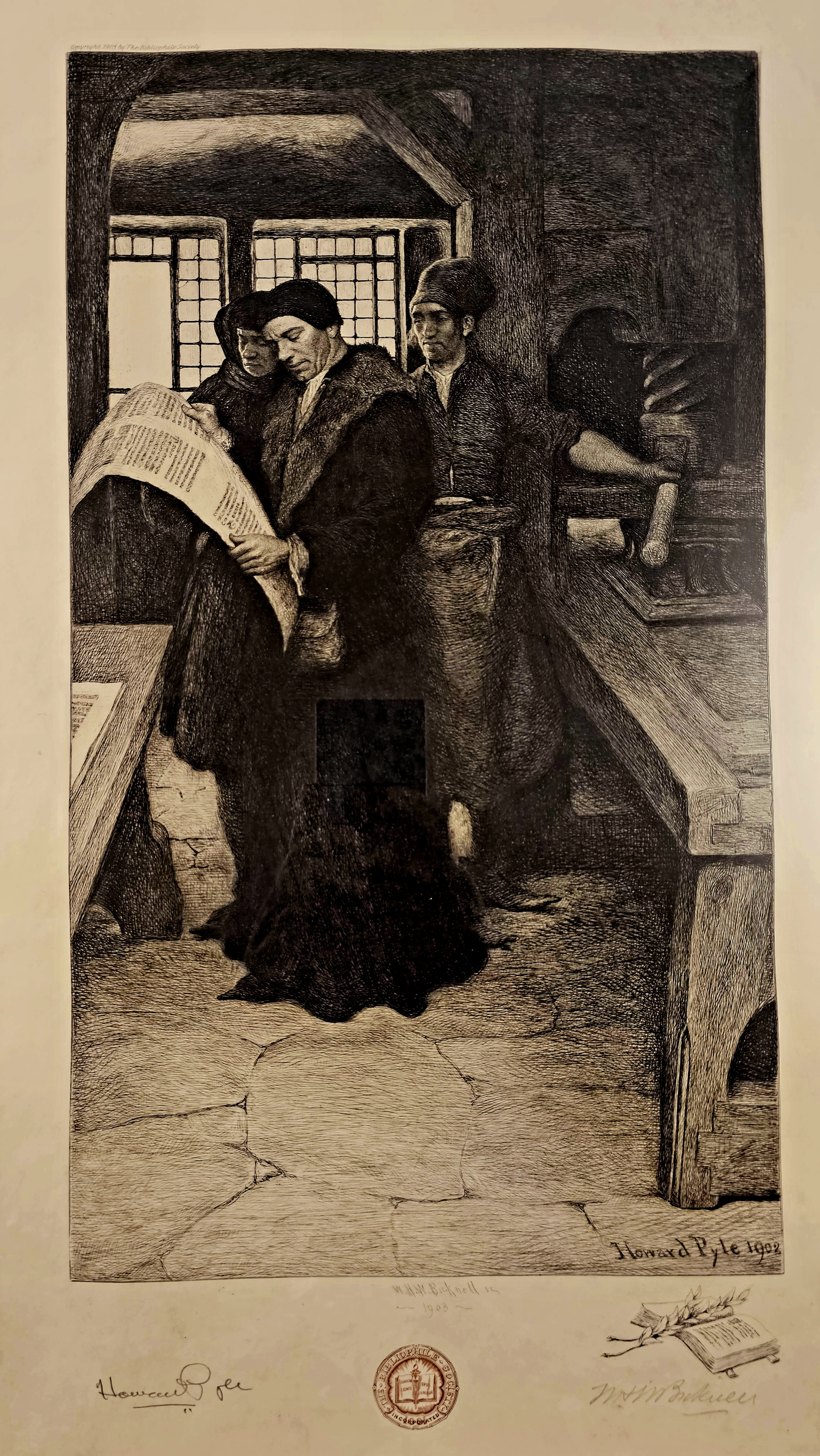
Caxton at his Press

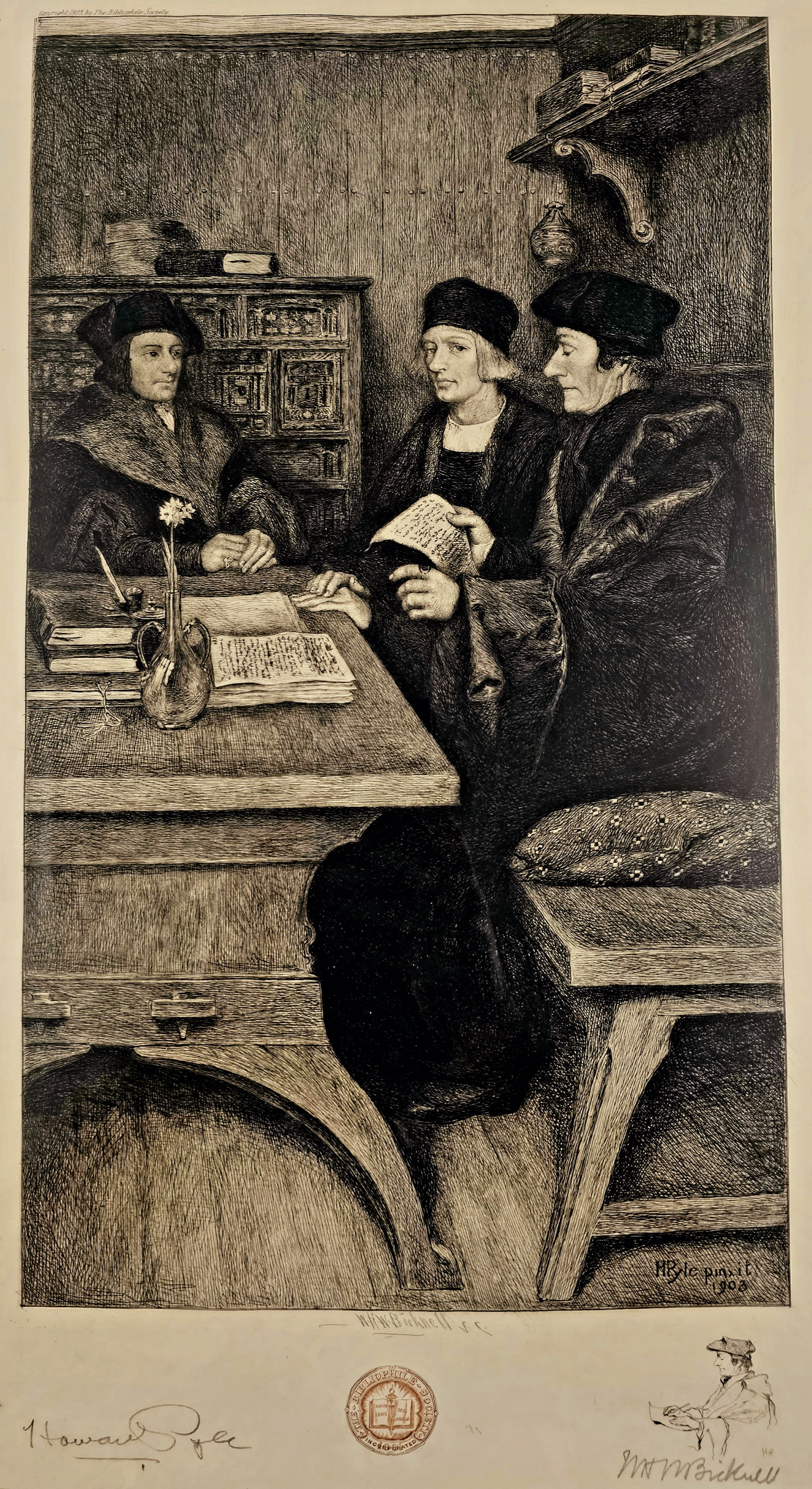
Erasmus reading to Colet and More

The remaining etchings are titled: "Friar" Bacon in His Study, and "Izaak" Walton

- The Wonder Clock (1887), a collection of twenty-four tales, one for each hour of the day. Each tale was prefaced by a whimsical verse telling of traditional household goings-on at that hour. His sister Katharine Pyle wrote the verses. Pyle created the tales based on traditional European folktales.
Bearskin and the Swineherd feast together, from The Wonder Clock
- Pepper and Salt, or Seasoning for Young Folk, traditional tales for younger readers which he also illustrated.
- After his death, a publisher collected a number of his pirate stories and illustrations and published them as Howard Pyle's Book of Pirates (1921).
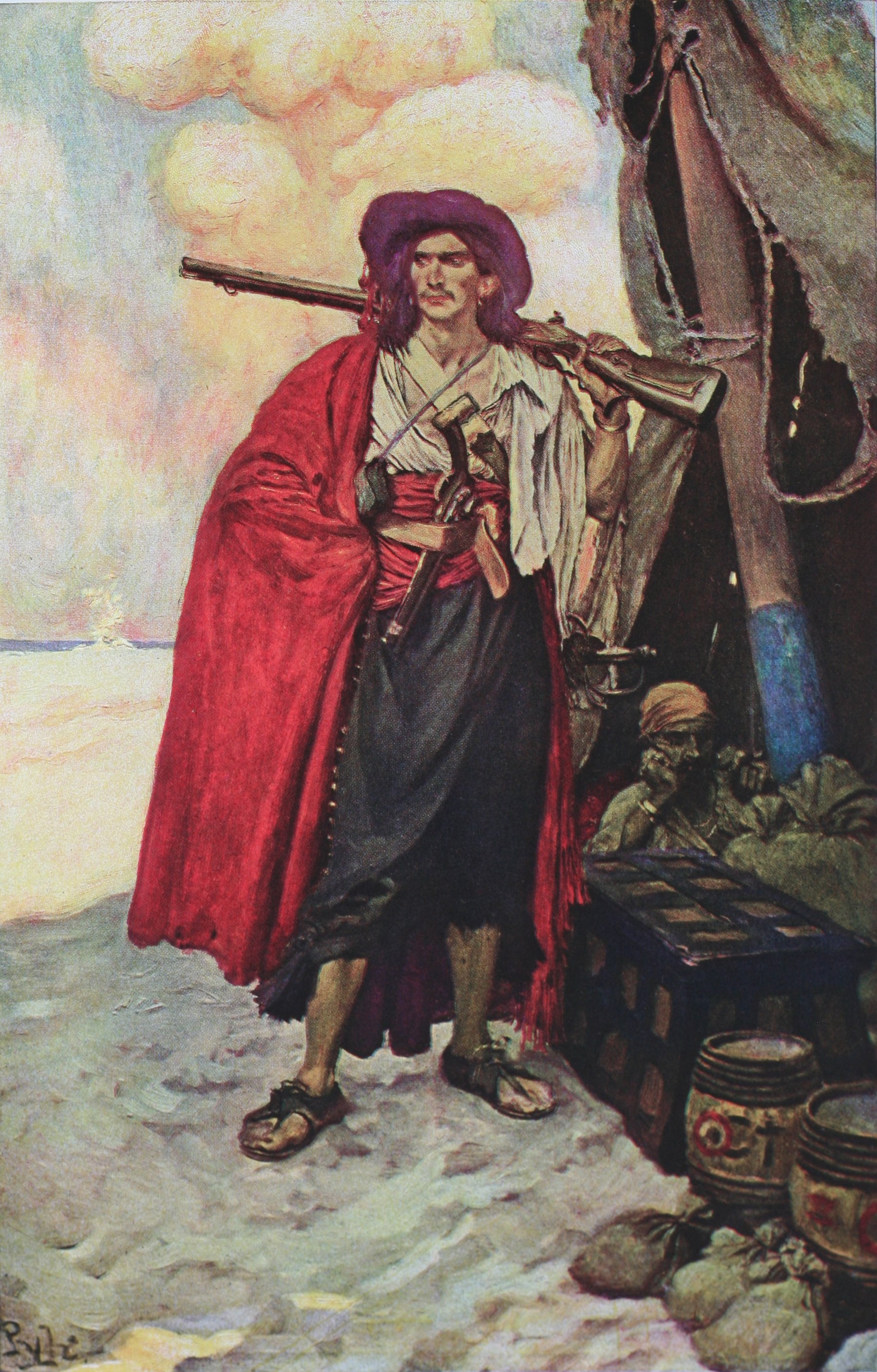
Buccaneer of the Caribbean, from Howard Pyle's Book of Pirates

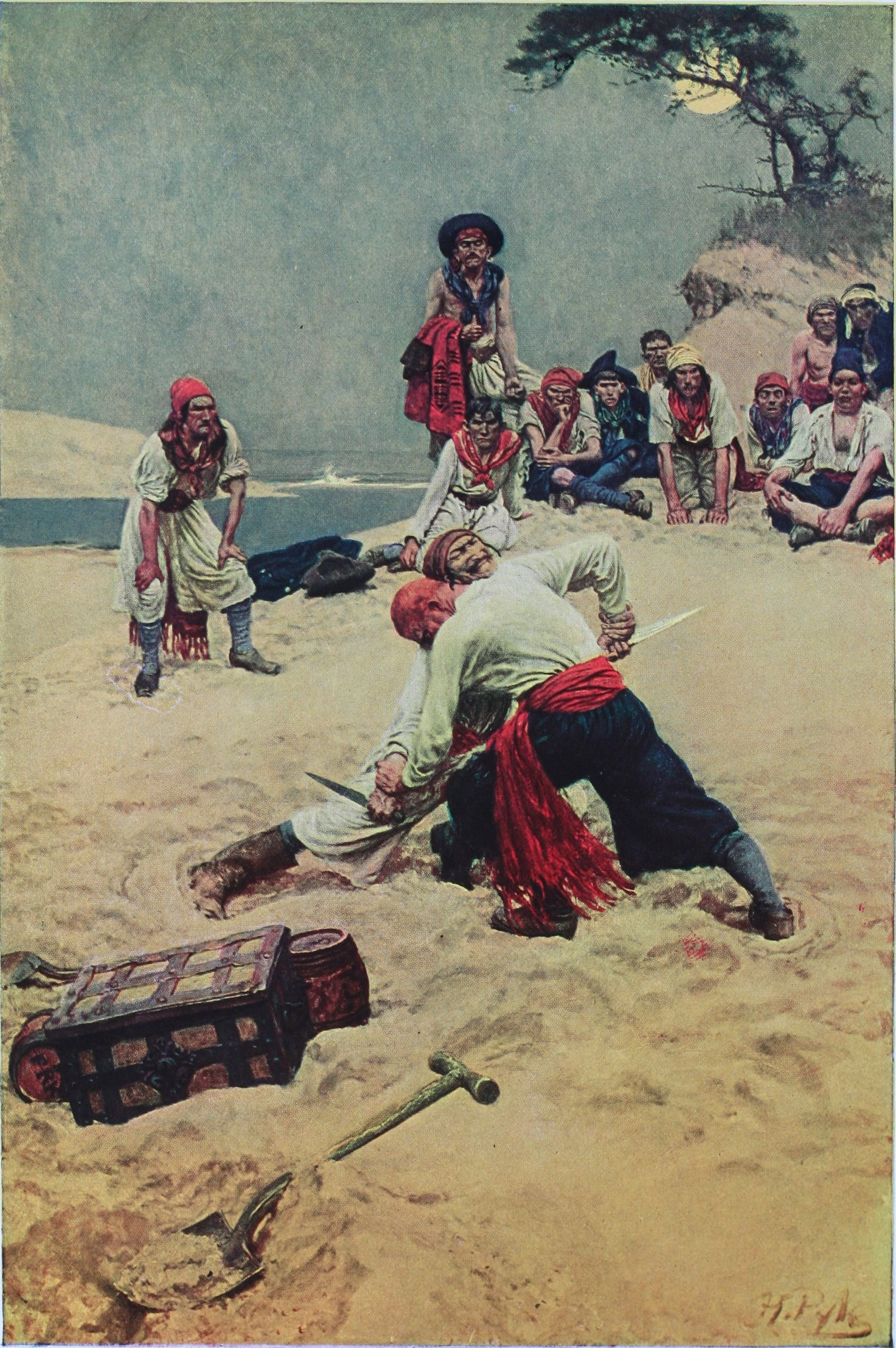
Pirates fight in Who Shall Be Captain?, 1911, from Howard Pyle's Book of Pirates

== Critical response ==
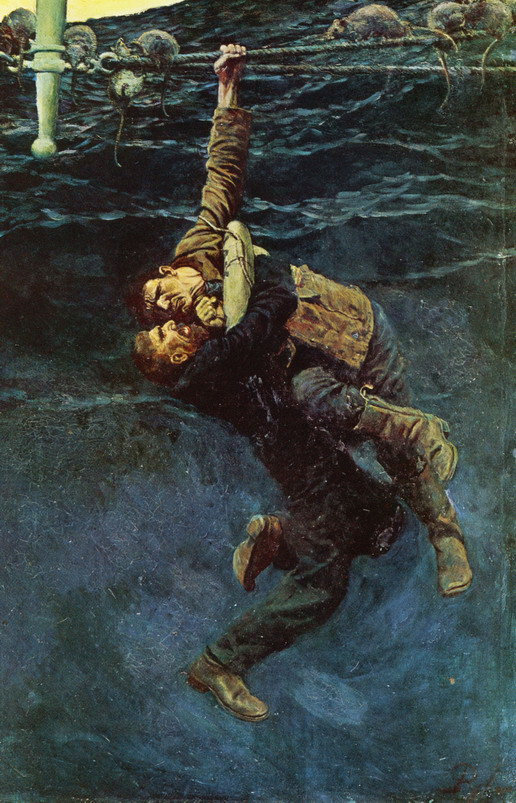
He lost his hold and fell, taking me with him from "The Grain Ship" by Morgan Robertson, in Harper's Monthly Magazine, March 1909

Pyle was widely respected during his life and continues to be well regarded by illustrators and fine artists. His contemporary Vincent van Gogh wrote in a letter to his brother Theo that Pyle's work "struck me dumb with admiration."

Pyle's reputation stems from his innovation in form and illustration, creating an American school of illustration and art, and for the revival of children's books. His illustrations are vivid and imaginative, yet not overly fantastic or contrived, lending them an air of colorful realism. Twentieth-Century Literary Criticism notes:

As time passed, Pyle's historical position as the founder of a distinctly American school of illustration and art, as the innovator who introduced the total-design approach, and as the great reinventor of children's books, would outshine any single work he did, so that he is remembered less for any one project than for his total stance.

He had a lasting influence on a number of artists who became notable in their own right. Some of his more notable students were N. C. Wyeth, Frank Schoonover, Elenore Abbott, Ethel Franklin Betts, Anna Whelan Betts, Harvey Dunn, Clyde O. DeLand, Philip R. Goodwin, Thornton Oakley, Violet Oakley, Ellen Bernard Thompson Pyle, Olive Rush, Blanche Grant, Ethel Leach, Allen Tupper True, Elizabeth Shippen Green, Arthur E. Becher, William James Aylward, Jessie Willcox Smith, and Charlotte Harding. Pyle taught his students at his home and studio in Wilmington, which is still standing and is listed on the National Register of Historic Places. Pyle was an early member of The Franklin Inn Club in Philadelphia.

According to Robert Vitz, the Howard Pyle School of Art developed a common set of themes in its work: attention to realism and expression of optimism and a faith in the goodness of America. His work also continued to inspire well after his death; for example, comic book artist Tony Harris (born 1969) has cited Pyle as a major influence on his work.

Pyle is remembered primarily as an illustrator, but his books have also been analyzed for their literary qualities, particularly The Merry Adventures of Robin Hood. Taimi M. Ranta and Jill P. May have examined their influence on children's literature. May writes from a feminist sensibility. Susan F. Beegel has studied his influence on Ernest Hemingway. Alethia Helbig has reviewed his poetry, which since his death has not been as highly valued as it was in his own time.

Malcolm Usrey wrote that Otto of the Silver Hand

has all the marks of a good historical novel: it has an exciting plot, with ample conflict and believable characters; it uses language and dialect appropriate to its setting and the characters; it has a significant, universal theme, and it presents the details of daily life in Germany of the thirteenth century accurately and unobtrusively, making the period real and alive.

== Selected bibliography ==
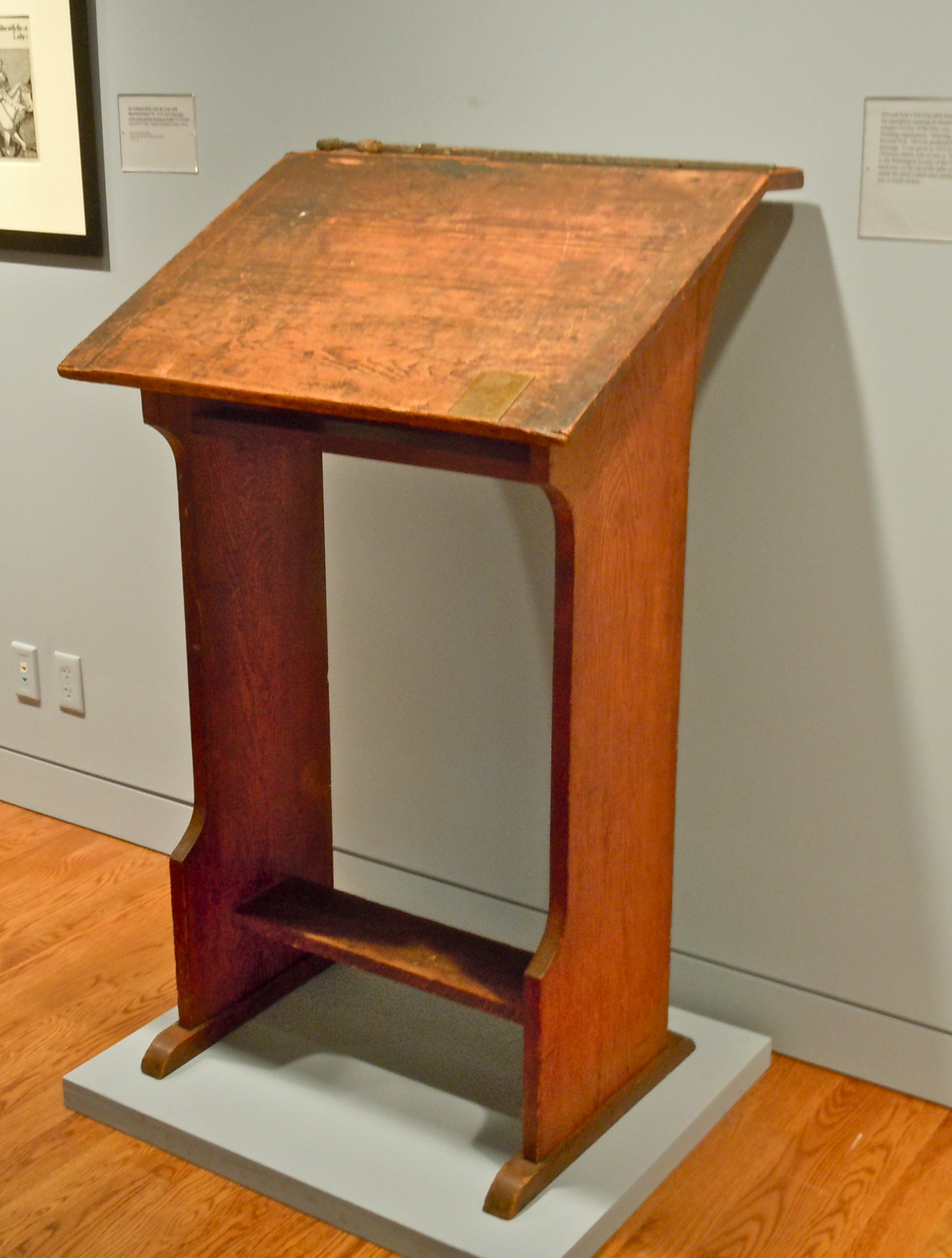
Drawing desk on which Pyle produced his King Arthur drawings, at the Delaware Art Museum

Unless noted otherwise, all titles are listed in The Dictionary of American Biography.

- The Merry Adventures of Robin Hood (1883)
- Within the Capes (1885)
- "Pepper and Salt; or, Seasoning for Young Folk". onlinebooks.library.upenn.edu. 1886.
- The Rose of Paradise (1888)
- The Wonder Clock (1888), with his sister Katharine Pyle
- Otto of the Silver Hand (1888)
- A Modern Aladdin (1892)
- Men of Iron (1892)
- Twilight Land (1895)
- The Story of Jack Ballister's Fortunes (1895)
- The Garden Behind the Moon (1895)
- The Ghost of Captain Brand (1896)
- Washington (Text by Woodrow Wilson, then a history professor; published in 1897)
- Story of the Revolution (Text by Henry Cabot Lodge; published in 1898)
- The Price of Blood (1899)
- History of the American People (Text by Woodrow Wilson; published in 1902)
- Rejected of Men (1903)
- The Story of King Arthur and His Knights (1903)
- The Story of the Champions of the Round Table (1905)
- The Story of Sir Launcelot and His Companions (1907)
- The Story of the Grail and the Passing of King Arthur (1910)
- Stolen Treasure (1907)
- The Ruby of Kishmoor (1908)
- Howard Pyle's Book of Pirates (A collection of previously published material, assembled in 1921)

== See also ==
- Delaware Art Museum
- Le Trésor de Rackham le Rouge
- National Museum of American Illustration
