= A Little Princess =

1905 novel and 1902 play by Frances Hodgson Burnett

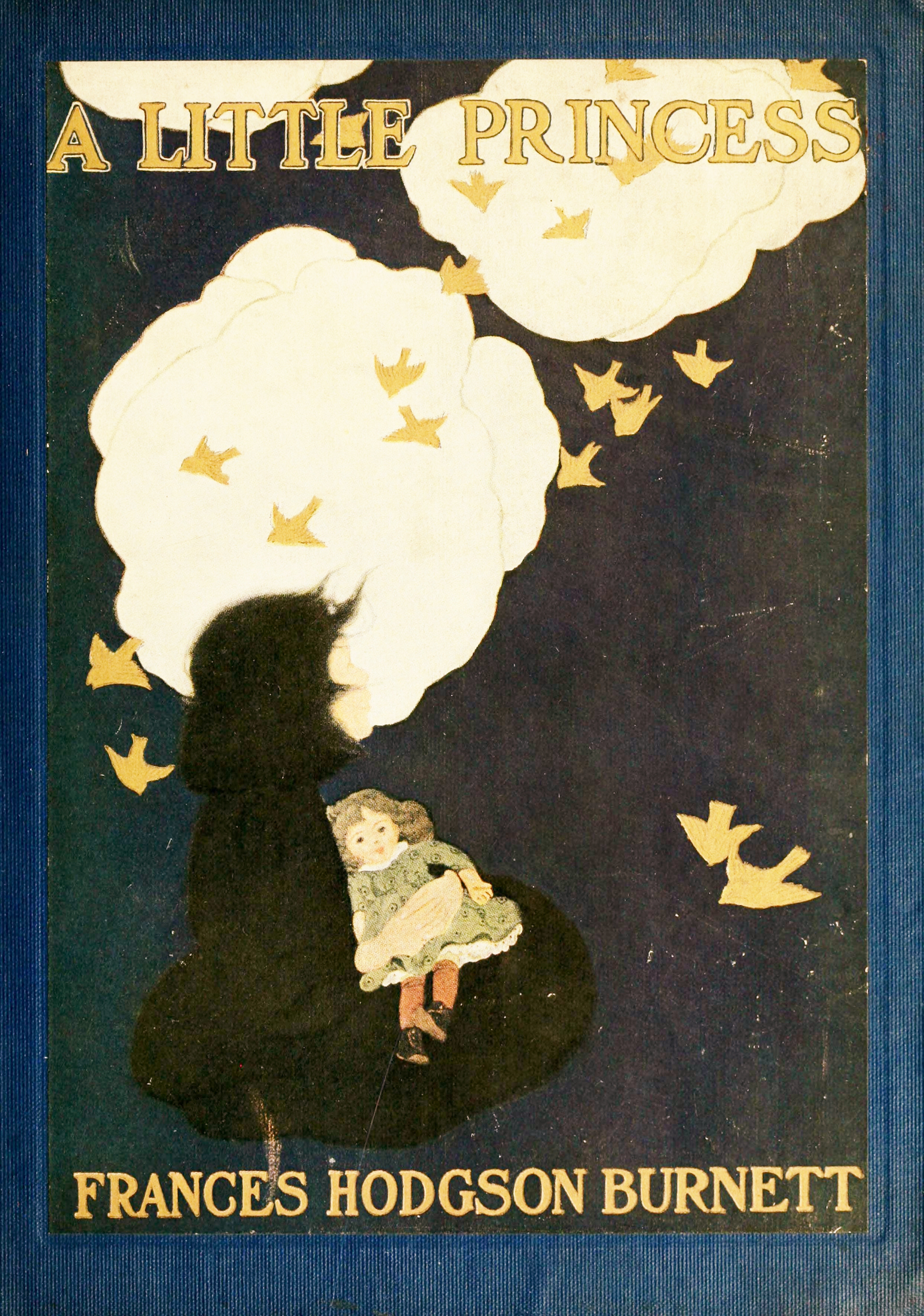
- Front cover of the first US edition of A Little Princess (1905)
- Author: Frances Hodgson Burnett
- Illustrator: Reginald B. Birch (1888, 1938); Ethel Franklin Betts (US, 1905); Harold H. Piffard (UK, 1905)
- Language: English
- Genre: Children's literature
- Set in: London, Victorian era
- Publisher: Charles Scribner's Sons (US); Frederick Warne & Co. (UK)
- Publication date: December 1887 – February 1888 (magazine); 29 February 1888 (novella); 30 September 1905 (novel)
- Publication place: United States; United Kingdom
- Media type: Print (hardcover)
- Pages: 75 (novella); 266 (novel)
- LC Class: PZ7.B934 S (1888); PZ7.B934 Sa (1905); PZ7.B934 S23 (1938)
- Text: A Little Princess at Wikisource
- Copyright: Public Domain (in most countries)

A Little Un-fairy Princess
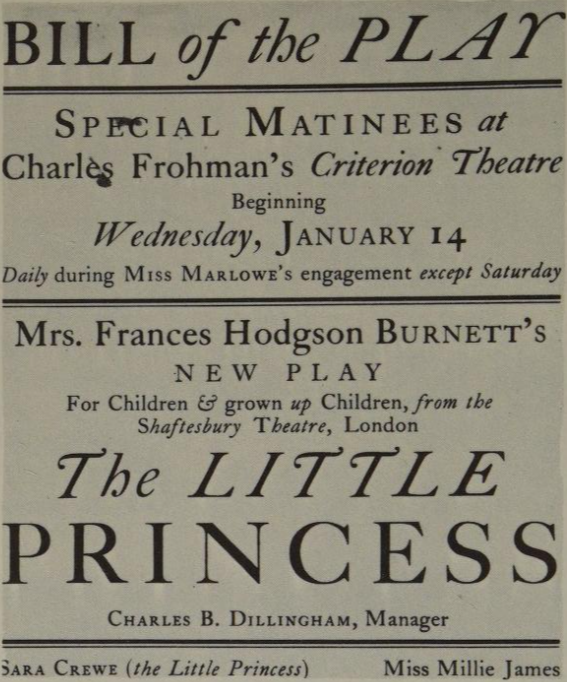
- Playbill of the first US production (1903)
- Original language: English
- Written by: Frances Hodgson Burnett

Premiere
- Date: 20 December 1902
- Place: Shaftesbury Theatre, London

A Little Princess is a work by English-American author Frances Hodgson Burnett, presented as a 1888 novella, a 1902 play and a 1905 children's novel. All three versions tell the story of Sara Crewe, a wealthy young girl and the prize student of a private London boarding school who is reduced to poverty and forced to endure the life of a servant under the school's cruel headmistress.

The story was first published as the novella Sara Crewe: or, What Happened at Miss Minchin's, which was serialised in St. Nicholas Magazine from December 1887, and published in book form in 1888. According to Burnett, after she composed the 1902 play A Little Un-fairy Princess based on this work, her publisher asked that she expand the story into a full-length novel with "the things and people that had been left out before". The novel was published by Charles Scribner's Sons (also publisher of St. Nicholas Magazine) with illustrations by Ethel Franklin Betts and the full title A Little Princess: Being the Whole Story of Sara Crewe Now Being Told for the First Time.

== Plot summary ==
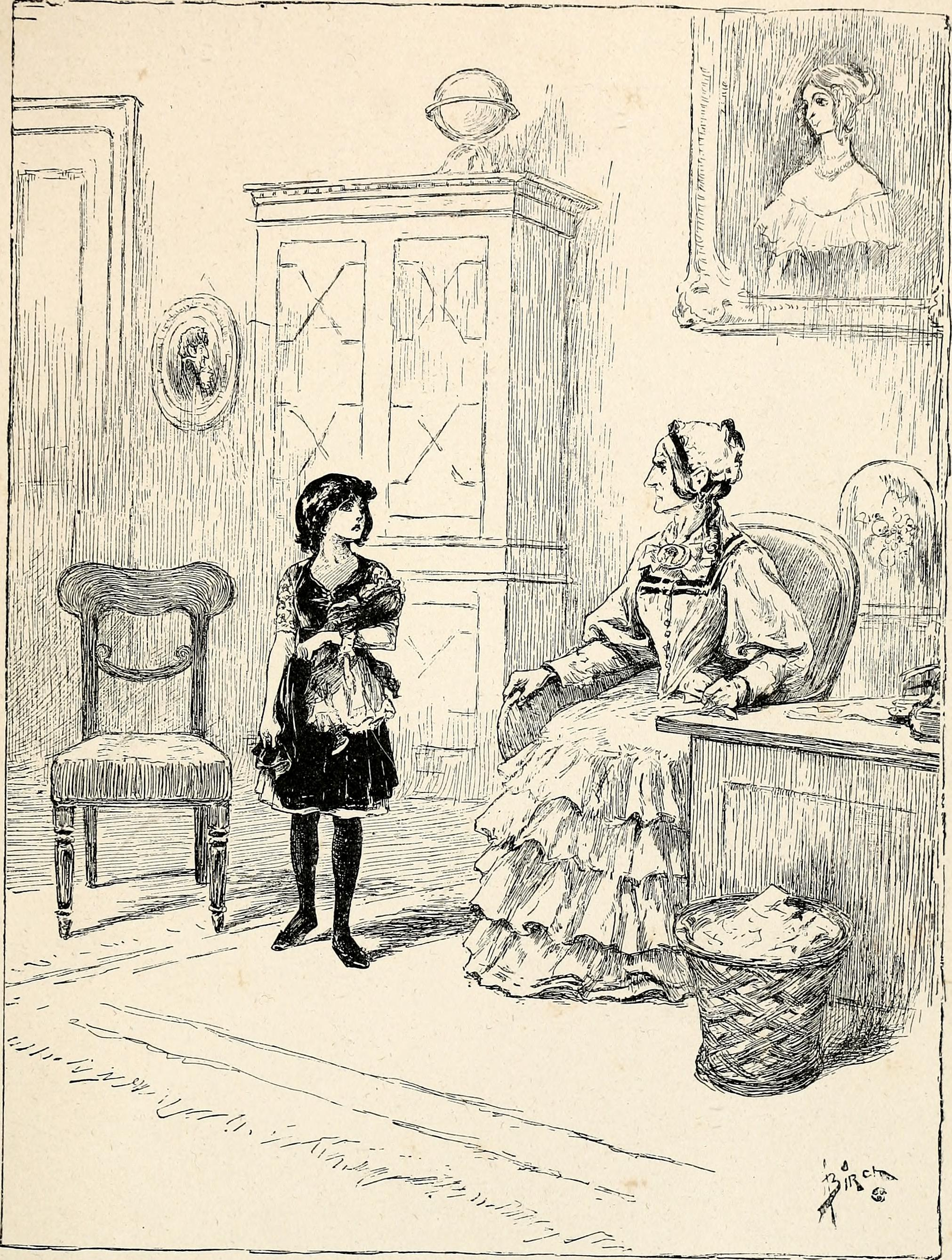
She Slowly Advanced into the Parlor, Clutching Her Doll: Illustration by Reginald B. Birch from Sara Crewe; or, What Happened at Miss Minchin's (1888)

Captain Ralph Crewe, a wealthy English widower, has been raising his only child, a beautiful daughter named Sara, in India where he is stationed with the British Army. Because the Indian climate is considered too harsh for their children, British families living there traditionally send their children to boarding school back home in England.

The Captain enrols his seven-year-old daughter at an all-girls boarding school in London and pays the haughty headmistress, Miss Minchin, for special treatment and exceptional luxuries for Sara. Miss Minchin openly fawns over Sara but secretly resents her (as she does all her rich pupils) and is eager to milk her for as much money as she can.

Intelligent, imaginative and kind, Sara sees through Miss Minchin's flattery and remains unspoiled; she embraces the status of a 'princess' accorded by the other students and lives up to it with her compassion and generosity. She befriends Ermengarde, the school dunce; Lottie, an undisciplined four-year-old student given to tantrums; and Becky, the stunted scullery maid.

Four years later, Sara's eleventh birthday is celebrated at Miss Minchin's with a lavish party. Just as it ends, Miss Minchin learns of Captain Crewe's unfortunate demise due to jungle fever. Furthermore, his estate is bankrupt due to the captain's failed investments in diamond mining. Preteen Sara is left an orphan and a pauper with nowhere to go, while Miss Minchin is left with a sizeable debt for Sara's school fees and luxuries. Infuriated and pitiless, yet aware of the reputational damage to the school if she turns Sara out, the miserly headmistress strips Sara of all her possessions except for her doll Emily and her tattered old black frock and moves her into the school's dusty and unheated attic.

For the next two years Miss Minchin starves and overworks Sara, turning her into a menial servant and unpaid tutor. Most of the students take to abusing their former classmate, but Sara is consoled by her few friends and uses her imagination to cope with her bleak existence. She continues to be kind and polite to everyone, even her abusers, in the belief that conduct, not money, make a true princess. On one particular cold day, she finds a 4d coin (equivalent to £2 in 2025) to buy six fresh buns but ends up giving five of them to a beggar-child because the girl is hungrier than she is. This act of generosity impresses the baker, who takes the beggar-child in.

During this time, Mr Carrisford moves into the house next to the seminary. He is an extremely wealthy invalid from abroad and retains Mr Carmichael, a solicitor who lives nearby. Sara has often observed Mr Carmichael's big and loving family, whom she dubs the "Large Family" – while they are equally curious about her and call her "the little girl who is not a beggar". Mr Carrisford is revealed to have been Captain Crewe's partner in the diamond mine venture. Thinking all was lost and while both men were suffering from severe illness, Carrisford abandoned Captain Crewe and wandered in a delirium. By the time he recovered, the captain was dead - just as the mines became profitable. Blaming himself for his friend's death, he has vowed to find Sara.

Ram Dass, Mr Carrisford's Indian servant, climbs across the roof to retrieve a pet monkey which has taken refuge in Sara's attic. He sees the poor condition of her room and, touched by her courtesy and demeanour, sets out to discover her history. To distract his master from his own sorrows, he tells Mr Carrisford about the "little girl in the attic". Between them they devise a scheme whereby Mr Carrisford becomes "The Magician", a mysterious benefactor who transforms her barren existence with gifts of food and warmth and books – sneaked in by Ram Dass.

One night the monkey again visits Sara's attic, and she decides to return it to Mr Carrisford the next morning. He learns that Sara is Captain Crewe's daughter; Sara also learns that Mr Carrisford was her father's friend – and The Magician. Miss Minchin pays a visit to collect Sara but is informed that Sara will be living with Mr Carrisford from now on; not only is she now his legal ward, but also a wealthy heiress after inheriting her father's stake in the mines. When Miss Minchin threatens to have Mr Carrisford charged with kidnapping and criminal trespass, Mr Carmichael appears and says he will expose her mistreatment of Sara in return. With her future secure, Sara visits the baker in full finery, saying she will pay for food to feed any hungry child.

== Characters ==
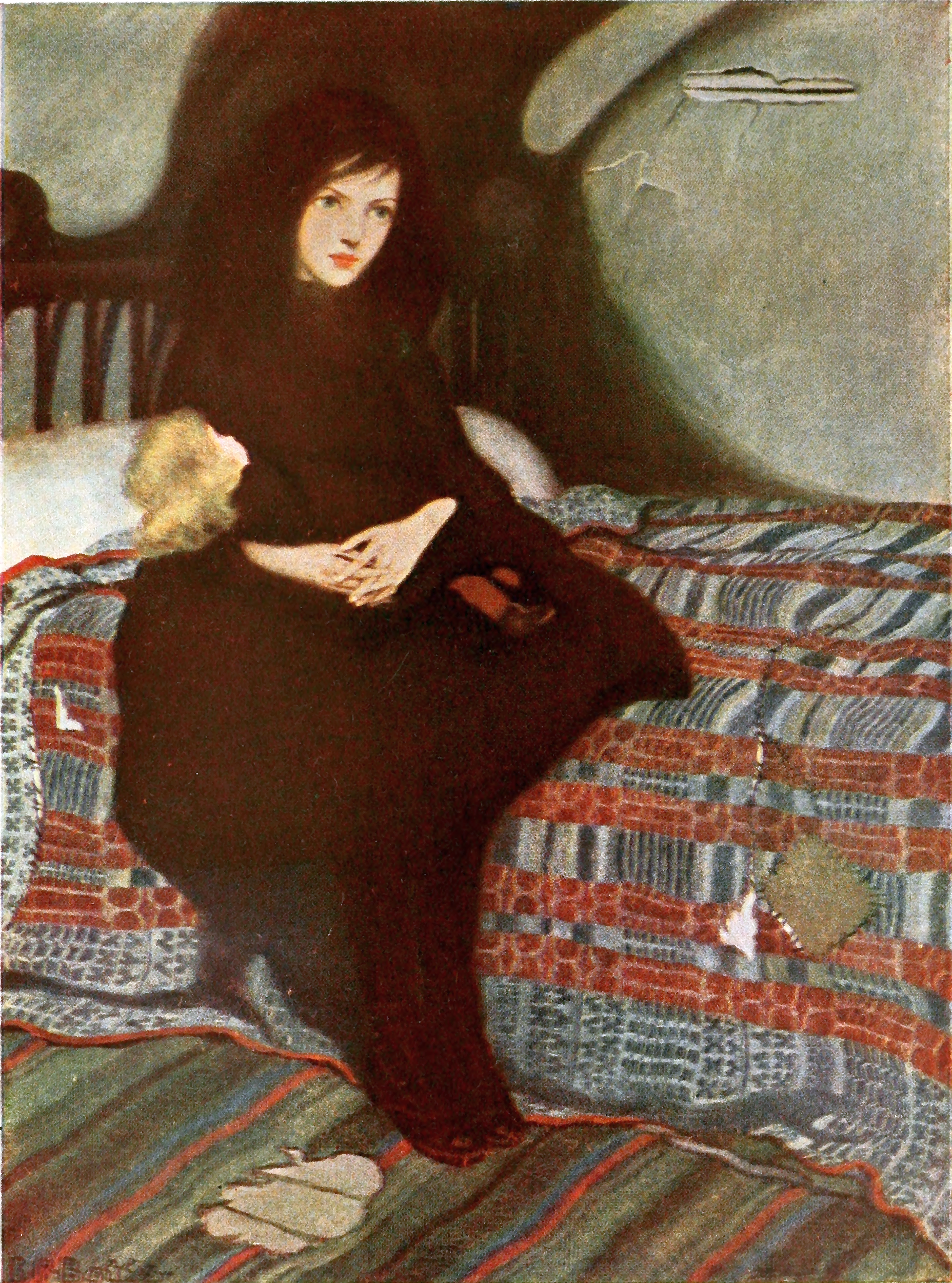
She seldom cried. She did not cry now. 1905 illustration by Ethel Franklin Betts from A Little Princess (1917 edition).

- Sara Crewe: The "little princess" of the title, the only daughter of Captain Ralph Crewe. Although she considers herself ugly, she is described as quite charming and beautiful, being tall and slim for her age, with thick, short black hair curled at the tips, and big greenish gray eyes framed by long lashes. Orphaned of her mother, who died giving birth to her, Sara was born in India and lived there for seven years, learning Hindi, English, and French, her mother’s language. At seven, her father brings her to England to attend Miss Minchin’s boarding school for girls. Despite her wealth, Sara shows great generosity and kindness toward all social ranks. She is also very intelligent and a talented storyteller with a vivid imagination. On her eleventh birthday, she learns of her father’s death and is forced to work as a servant in the school. She maintains a strong and resilient attitude, even after those around her treat her coldly following her father’s death, never losing her dignity. She is thirteen years old by the end of the story. Although Sara is a very positive character, Burnett notes that she is not perfect. Sometimes she is impulsive, occasionally talks back to Miss Minchin, and at one point struggles to hold herself back from hitting Lavinia after being provoked.
- Ralph Crewe: Sara’s father. A British Army officer, described as young, handsome and rich. He is very close to his only daughter and never tires of listening to her quirky talks. He leaves Sara at boarding school in England because the climate in India is bad for children. Still young and adventurous, Captain Crewe is not very careful with his fortune. He has always given everything to his daughter, spoiling her in many ways. He dies of tropical fever on a mountain in India. At that point, his business appears to have failed, and he is said to be penniless, but after his death, the enterprise becomes successful.
- Miss Maria Minchin: The headmistress of the eponymous boarding school: Miss Minchin, Select Seminary for Young Ladies. Described as tall, slender, and cold, she is a very harsh, strict and tyrannical woman. However, she can be kind to those who may bring money or prestige to her school. In fact, she is a very greedy and opportunist person, that relies entirely on the donations made to the school by the students’ parents. She becomes very cruel to Sara after she loses her fortune. She only realizes her wrongdoings toward the end of the novel, understanding that it was her own cruelty and actions toward Sara (and not Sara herself) that drove the child to leave the school for good.
- Miss Amelia Minchin: Maria Minchin’s younger sister. She is described as slightly overweight. More pleasant than the latter but much weaker in temperament, Miss Amelia does not dare oppose the headmistress, who clearly dominates her in both personality and intelligence. However, Amelia vents her anger against her sister after learning of their downfall following Sara’s final departure. During a violent nervous breakdown, she finally manages to rebuke Miss Minchin for her cruelty toward the young orphan. From that moment on, Miss Minchin begins to show more respect and consideration for her younger sister, who turns out not to be as foolish as she seemed.
- Becky: The 14-year-old scullery maid of the school. She is very timid and fearful, and is described as being so small that she looks no older than twelve. Miss Minchin mistreats her and overworks her, and the other servants sometimes use her as a scapegoat. Sara first met her when Becky accidentally fell asleep by the fireplace in her room; unlike the older girls, she welcomed the young maid with kindness. She speaks with a Cockney accent and initially had difficulty reading and writing. She is five years older than Sara and admires her intelligence. Becky becomes friends with Sara while she is still wealthy and supports her when she is relegated to the attic. By the end of the novel, Becky also leaves the school to become Sara’s attendant. Becky is short for Rebecca.
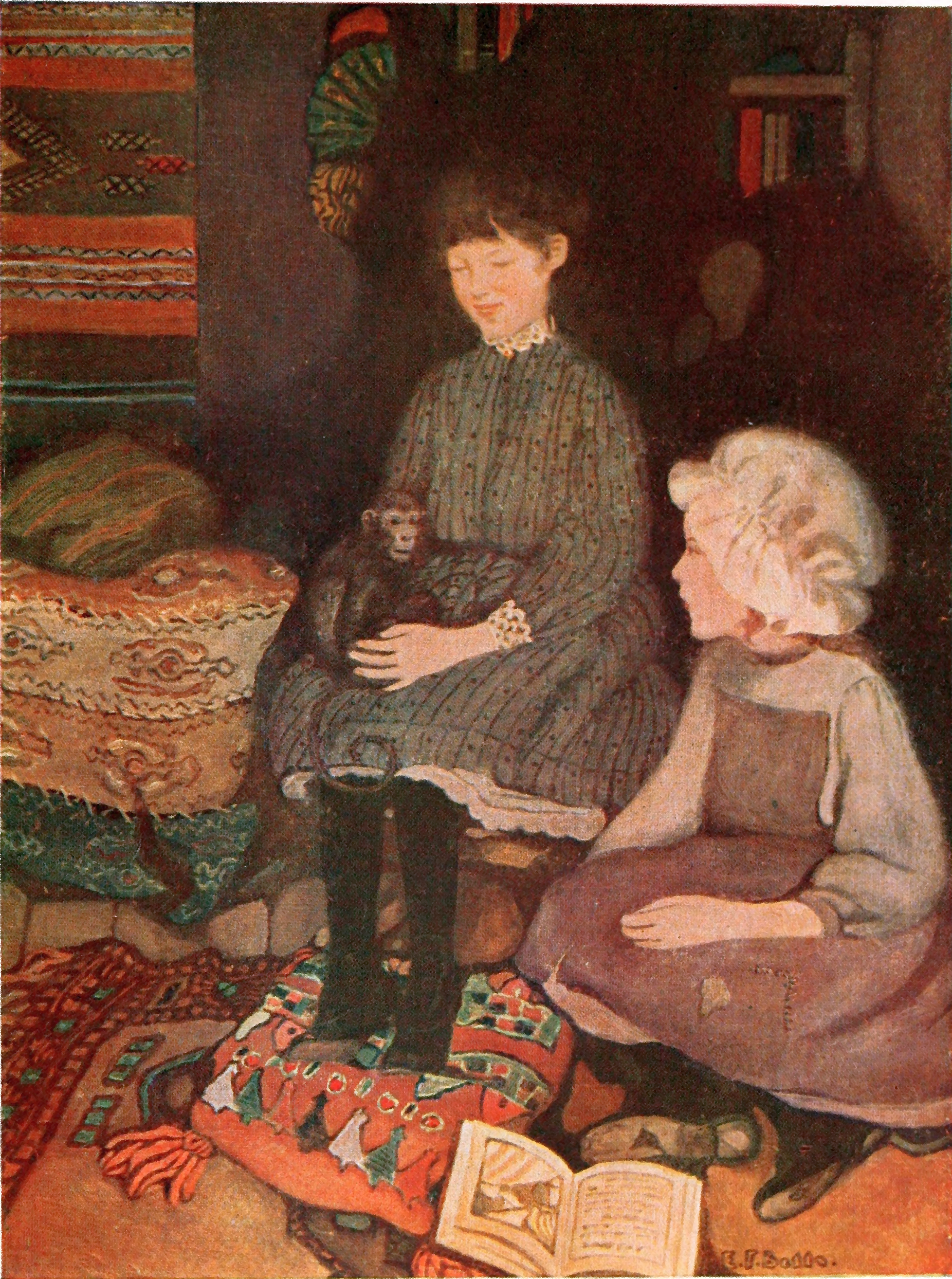
  She sat down and held him on her knee. 1905 illustration by Ethel Franklin Betts from A Little Princess (1917 edition).

Students

- Ermengarde St. John: Sara's best friend at the school, a timid and slightly plump girl. Considered the dunce of the seminary, she struggles with French and often draws the ire of Miss Minchin. Sara helps her by turning her lessons into captivating stories. The two are close friends and are the same age. Ermengarde is kind and loyal, showing deep care for Sara, whether she is rich or poor. She visits Sara in the attic even though it is forbidden when Sara becomes a servant. Her father is an intellectual who expects a lot from his daughter. Ermengarde has an aunt named Eliza who resembles her in personality.
- Lottie Legh: A four-year-old girl who has lost her mother. She was spoiled at home and often throws tantrums. Sara becomes her "adoptive mother" and is often the only one who can calm her down. Lottie is very attached to Sara and frequently visits her in the attic once Sara becomes a servant. Three years younger than Sara, she is four at the beginning of the story, and therefore ten by the end.
- Lavinia Herbert: One of the older girls. Described as very pretty and well-dressed, she is full of herself and bullies the younger girls. She was one of the top students before Sara arrived at the boarding school, as well as the richest, and Miss Minchin’s favorite; therefore, she is very jealous of Sara. Lavinia is the only student with whom Sara argues. When Sara loses her fortune, Lavinia mocks her and even tries to get her into trouble—such as when she informs Miss Minchin about Ermengarde’s visits to the attic. She is thirteen at the beginning of the story, and therefore nineteen by the end.
- Jessie: Lavinia’s best friend and confidante. Although she is described as silly, she has a better character than Lavinia and sometimes disapproves of the way Sara is treated by Miss Minchin and Lavinia.

The other side of the wall

- Mr Thomas Carrisford: The "Indian gentleman" who moves into the house next to the boarding school. It is later revealed that he was a friend of the late Captain Crewe, and his partner in the diamond mine venture. Sara, unaware of his identity for a long time, nicknames him the "Indian gentleman" because of the many items from India he has brought with him. He searched for Sara for two years and always felt responsible for the cause of his friend’s death, causing a decline in his health. When he finally found her, he was overjoyed and felt greatly relieved. He adopts Sara and restores to her all the wealth her father had left her as an inheritance, after the mine in which her father had invested all his fortune turns out to be extremely rich.
- Ram Dass: Mr Carrisford’s Indian servant, a lascar. He owns a little monkey that often runs across the rooftops. He watches Sara through the skylight and befriends her. Ram Dass is the one responsible for the "magic" that benefits Sara.
- Mr Carmichael: Mr Carrisford’s lawyer and the father of the "Large Family", whom Sara often watches from afar. His main task is to find Sara Crewe, which leads him to travel to Russia and France, but without success. In the original novella his name is Charles.
- Nora, Janet, and Donald Carmichael: Three children from the "Large Family". They meet Sara for the first time when Donald gives her the money he received for Christmas, mistaking her for a beggar. However, the older sisters notice Sara’s good manners and, despite her rags, begin to doubt appearances. They start keeping an eye on her, calling her "The-little-girl-who-is-not-a-beggar," unaware that she is actually Sara Crewe—the very girl their father is searching for. They have four other sisters whose names are not mentioned.

Other characters

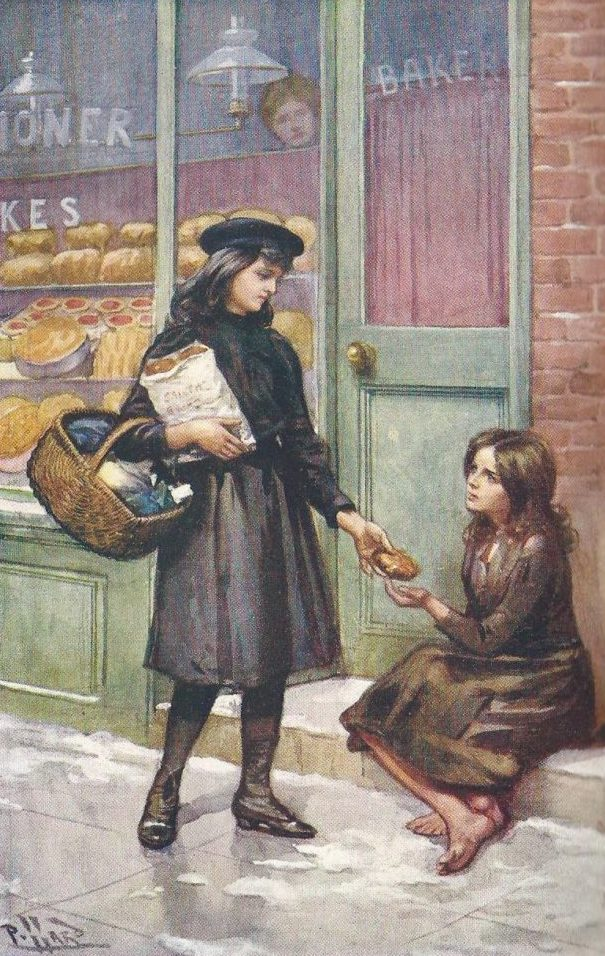
‘Eat it, and you will not feel so hungry.’ Illustration by Harold H. Piffard from the first UK edition of A Little Princess (1905).

- Anne: A little beggar whom Sara meets outside a bakery. Seeing that she is starving, Sara offers her five of the six buns she has just bought. Anne finds a home when she is taken in by the "bun lady" and ends up working in the bakery.
- Mrs Brown: More often referred to as the "bun-woman", she is the owner of a bakery. When Sara buys four buns with a coin she found on the street, the baker gives her six, seeing how poor and hungry she is. When Sara gives five of her buns to Anne outside the bakery, the woman is so moved that she decides to take the little beggar into her home.
- Emily: Sara’s doll, the last gift from her father before his death. Over time, Emily becomes like a friend and confidante to Sara, who imagines it to be alive. When Sara loses her fortune, Emily is the only thing she keeps, refusing to give it to Miss Minchin.
- Melchisedec: A rat living in the attic walls where Sara sleeps. He becomes Sara’s friend, and she often shares her meager food with him and his family.
- Mariette: Sara’s French maid. She is dismissed as soon as Sara loses her fortune.
- Monsieur Dufarge: The school’s French teacher. He is impressed by Sara’s French.
- Mr Barrow: One of Captain Crewe’s lawyers; a cold and distant man. He is the one who comes to announce Sara’s father’s death and suggests to Miss Minchin that Sara be kept as a servant.

== Background and publication history ==
=== Sara Crewe ===
Front cover of the first edition of Sara Crewe (1888).

Burnett wrote Sara Crewe in her Washington house; the story echoed memories of her childhood, such as the dead father, the child's slide into poverty, and her faculty for reading, storytelling and pretending. The novella appears to have been inspired in part by Charlotte Brontë's unfinished novel Emma, the first two chapters of which were published in Cornhill Magazine in 1860, featuring a rich heiress with a mysterious past who is apparently abandoned at a boarding school. Many critics have also noted influences from Brontë's Villette and Jane Eyre, and Thackeray's Vanity Fair, all of which are set, at least in part, in girls' boarding schools.

The plot is basically the same as the 1905 novel, but much less detailed. Some characters are barely defined, while others are entirely absent—most notably Becky. The students are treated as a group; only Ermengarde is named and Sara interacts with her solely to borrow books. The children of the Large Family remain unnamed, as Sara watches them from afar, and the father does not seem to be connected to Mr Carrisford until the end. Ram Dass is already present, but simply referred to as 'the Lascar'. Many events from the novel do not occur in this version. Captain Crewe, whose investments are only briefly mentioned, dies in the first chapter, so Sara’s life as a pupil is not described. The only indication of Sara’s kindness is when she gives buns to Anne. However, there are details in the novella that were not included in the novel. For example, when Sara becomes a servant, she frequents a library where she reads stories about damsels in distress being rescued by powerful men. It is also stated that Mr Carrisford’s illness is a liver problem.

Sara Crewe: or, What Happened at Miss Minchin's was originally serialized in three issues (December 1887 – February 1888) of St. Nicholas Magazine, illustrated by Reginald B. Birch. It was first published in book form on 29 February 1888 by Charles Scribner's Sons in New York. It was published the same year in London by Frederick Warne & Co., paired with another Burnett's novella, Editha's Burglar.

=== Play ===
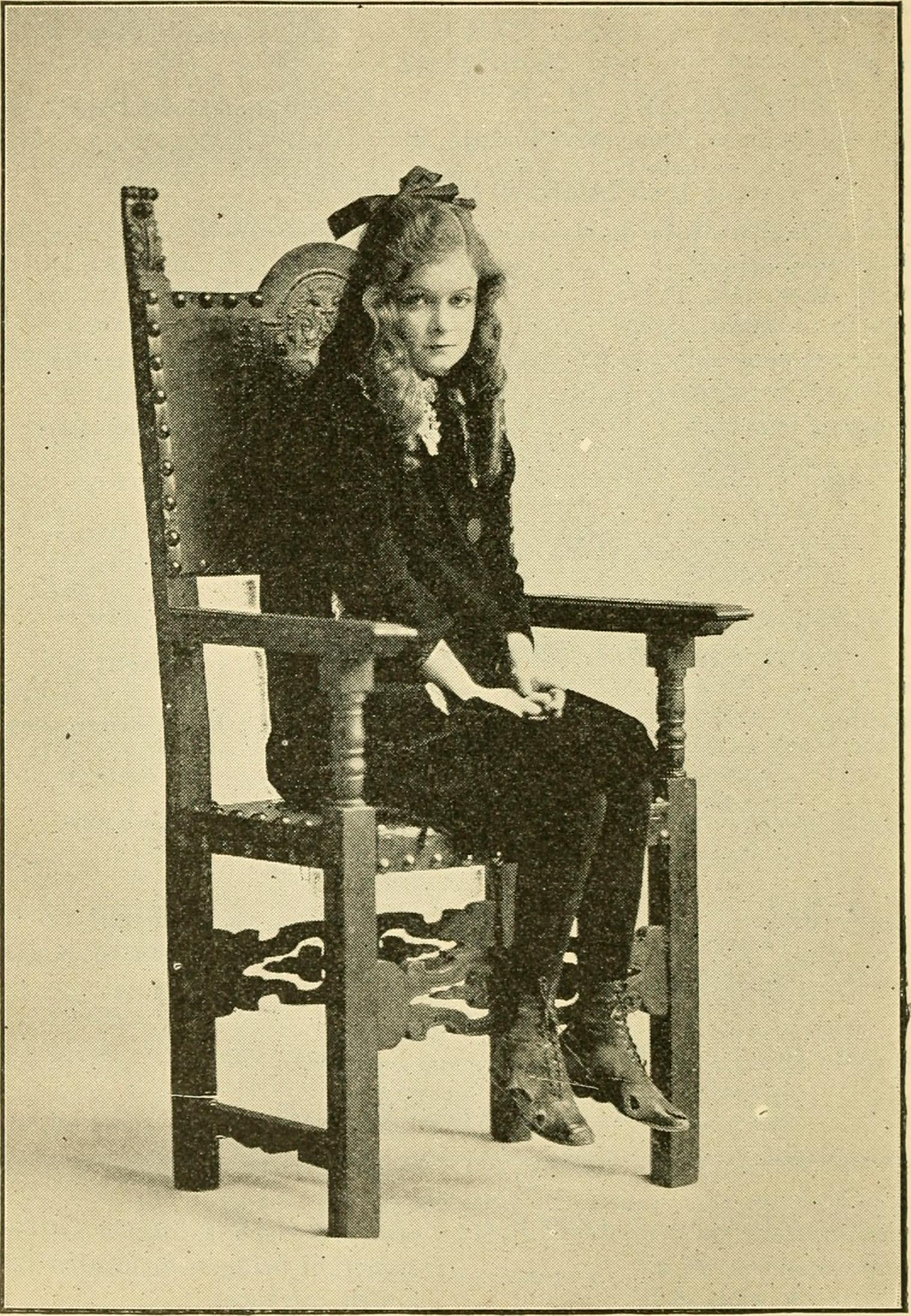
Millie James as Sara Crewe in the Broadway production of Burnett's play, The Little Princess (1903).

Burnett returned to the material in the summer of 1902, penning the three-act stage play A Little Un-fairy Princess. The plot remained substantially the same as the novella, but the characters were further developed and new ones were introduced, such as: Becky, Lottie, Lavinia, Jessie and Melchisedec. The play premiered in London on 20 December 1902, at the Shaftesbury Theater, with Beatrice Terry as Sara Crewe. The Broadway production, titled The Little Princess, opened on 14 January 1903, at the Criterion Theater, with Millie James as Sara Crewe. Around the time it transferred to New York City at the start of 1903 the title of the London production was shortened to A Little Princess. The play script was published in 1911 by Samuel French in New York, under the title The Little Princess: A Play for Children and Grown-up Children in Three Acts.

=== A Little Princess ===
Burnett said that after the production of the play on Broadway, her publisher, Charles Scribner's Sons, asked her to expand the story into a full-length novel and "put into it all the things and people that had been left out before". In the summer of 1903, Burnett arranged with the publisher to finish the novel by mid-September, so that it would be on sale for Christmas. On 30 July, she agreed to a two thousand dollar advance on a royalty of 12% for a book of sixty thousand words, but she later postponed the project to focus on her plays.

In June 1904, Burnett had returned to live at Maytham Hall in Kent, England, and by September she had resumed work on the novel. On 22 September, Burnett reported to her son Vivian that she was writing two thousand words a morning "with lightning rapidity... The story tells itself so well and with such nice things in it that it will reach the new race of children like a new big fat book". She also planned a preface to explain that the novel was like parts of a letter someone forgets to write: "I should not like the book to be published under the false pretence of being entirely new..." Burnett wrote the novel, at least in part, in the Rose Garden of Maytham Hall, the same garden that would later inspire The Secret Garden: "This place is so good for work. Nothing is like the Rose Garden. I have been writing there for some time and I could almost weep because the air is just little autumny and hints that I cannot write amongst roses much longer. But the golden days go on and on as I never saw them in England before. Never never was such a summer". On 4 November 1904, she delivered the final chapters of the novel to Scribner's. But it would not be released in time for Christmas, as Charles Scribner told her that "In the case of children's books, the machinery of publication has become vary elaborate and the booksellers place their orders long in advance. The travellers go out with their sample copies in July".

The book was illustrated by Ethel Franklin Betts and published on 30 September 1905 in New York under the full title A Little Princess: Being the Whole Story of Sara Crewe Now Being Told for the First Time. It was also published that year in November by Frederick Warne & Co. in London, with illustrations by Harold H. Piffard.

In 1938, Scribner’s reissued the novel both in New York and London, featuring new illustrations by Birch, who had previously illustrated the original novella.

== Reception ==
Based on a 2007 online poll, the U.S. National Education Association listed the book as one of its "Teachers' Top 100 Books for Children". In 2012 it was ranked number 56 on a list of the top 100 children's novels published by School Library Journal.

== Themes ==
Scholars have interpreted A Little Princess as exploring the relationship between social class, moral character, and education. Sara Crewe's fall from wealth to poverty exposes how strongly status influences the treatment of children within Victorian society and Miss Minchin's seminary, while contrasting material privilege with personal virtue. A 2026 study interprets Lavinia Herbert as exemplifying pedagogical valuation, whereby children internalize institutional values that associate personal worth with wealth, prestige, and social position rather than moral character. The study argues that this perspective broadens interpretations of the novel by highlighting how educational values are reproduced among pupils as well as enforced by adult authority figures.

== Adaptations ==
=== Film ===
A Little Princess (1917)

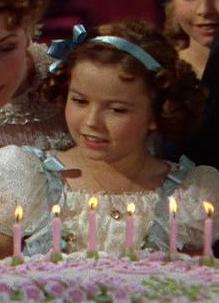
Shirley Temple as Sara in The Little Princess (1939)

- 1917 version: Mary Pickford as Sara and Katherine Griffith as Miss Minchin.
- 1939 version: Shirley Temple as Sara and Mary Nash as Miss Minchin. This Technicolor adaptation notably differs from the original, in that Sara's father is wounded and missing in action in wartime, and later is reunited with his daughter with the help of Queen Victoria. Miss Minchin's younger sister Miss Amelia is replaced with "Mr Bertie", Miss Minchin's brother, a former music hall performer, who sings and dances with Temple. A substantial portion of the story is given over to Sara's abetting of an illicit romance between an under-teacher and the school's riding master, dramatized in an elaborate fairy-tale dream sequence.
- 1943 Italian version: Principessina: Rosanna Dal as Anna and Vittorina Benvenuti as the Headmistress. It is a remake of the 1939 film set in Italy, in which Sara, now renamed Anna, is the daughter of a real prince.
- Harō Kiti no shōkōjo: 1994 OVA version starring Hello Kitty produced by Sanrio.
- 1995 American version: Liesel Matthews as Sara and Eleanor Bron as Miss Minchin, this adaptation notably differs from the original and more closely resembles the 1939 version, in that Sara's father is wounded and missing in action in wartime, and later is reunited with his daughter. Another difference is that it takes place in New York City during World War I instead of London during the Boer War, and the character of Becky, canonically Cockney, is recast as African-American. The film is directed by Alfonso Cuarón.
- 1995 Filipino version Sarah... Ang Munting Prinsesa: Camille Prats as Sara (name changed to "Sarah"), Angelica Panganiban as Becky, and Jean Garcia as Ms. Minchin. This adaptation was mostly based on the 1985 Japanese anime series Princess Sarah, which was hugely popular with Filipino audiences during the 1990s. The film was mostly shot in Scotland, with other scenes in Baguio, Philippines.
- 1996 version: An animated direct-to-video film produced by Blye Migicovsky and directed by Laura Shephard. As in the 1939 and 1995 film adaptations, Sara's father is later found alive, and, like in the 1995 film, Becky is black. The voice cast includes Melissa Bathory, Lawrence Bayne, Desmond Ellis, Nonnie Griffin, Marieve Herington, Sarena Paton, Katherine Shekter, and Colette Stevenson.
- 1997 Russian film A Little Princess: Anastasiya Meskova as Sara and Alla Demidova as Miss Minchin.

=== Television ===
- 1973 version: Deborah Makepeace as Sara and Ruth Dunning as Miss Minchin, considered to be faithful to the original novel.
- Shōkōjo Sēra: a 1978 Japanese anime version, eleven 10-minute episodes in anthology series Manga Sekai Mukashi Banashi. This adaptation is notable for the more cruel script, focused on the abuse that Sara and Becky have to suffer from Miss Minchin, Lavinia and Amelia, now as mean as her sister. It also adds new characters and events while skipping over others from the novel, such as Mr Carmichael's family. Sara and Becky are friends with three orphaned boys that help them in several occasions, such as when Becky gets sick and Miss Minchin doesn't want to call a doctor. Sara has a love interest in Frederick, the son of a wealthy supporter of the school. In the ending Sara and Becky are thrown out of the institute, but when they are found by Mr Carrisford, Sara returns to the school with Becky after making a large donation to it, and make up with Lavinia.
- "A Little Princess", five 1984 episodes of Jackanory narrated by Jane Asher.
- Princess Sara: a 1985 Japanese anime series, which was featured as part of Nippon Animation's World Masterpiece Theater collection. The series spanned 46 episodes, including a few new characters and adventures along the way, while following pretty closely the original plot. Some of the new additions resembles the 1978 anime version: the addition of a street boy among Sara's friends, Sara's dangerous illness, her departure from the institute, her forgiveness for Miss Minchin and Lavinia, who is also a more prominent character here, and her huge donation to the school. Similarly to the 1978 adaptation, this version focuses more on the saddest aspects of the story, such as Miss Minchin's abuse and Lavinia's bullying, although in a more mildly and less violent way. Furthermore, Sara's personality has been made significantly more obedient and kind than in the novel. Veteran Japanese voice actress Sumi Shimamoto voiced Sara Crewe.
- 1986 version: Amelia Shankley as Sara and Maureen Lipman as Miss Minchin. It is one of the most faithful adaptations, quoting many dialogues from the book and adding only a few new scenes, including a prologue set in India.
- Sōkō no Strain, a 2006 anime that completely reworks the story into a mecha series about "Sara Werec", who finds herself robbed of the ability to pilot the titular Strain when her brother, Ralph, betrays and disgraces her family.
- Princess Sarah, a Filipino 2007 remake, loosely based on the popular 1985 anime but with fantasy elements.
- Shōkōjo Seira, a 2009 remake with the main character Japanese and named Seira, aged 16 when her father dies, and as an Indian Princess. Becky is changed to a male and a romantic lead. The 1985 TV series by Nippon Animation has a similar title in Japanese, although the two adaptations are not related.
- "The Penniless Princess" (2012), a VeggieTales episode
- A Caverna Encantada, a Brazilian telenovela produced and broadcast by SBT, created by Íris Abravanel who adapted this book and also The Secret Garden, premiered on 29 July 2024. Mel Summers as Anna Salvatore, Clarice Niskier as Diretora Norma Alencar and Juju Penido as Lavínia Elizabeth Albuquerque.

=== Musicals ===
Due in part to the novel's public domain status, several musical versions of A Little Princess have emerged in recent years, including:

- A Little Princess, Music and Lyrics by Eric Rockwell and Margaret Rose, Book by William J. Brooke. World premiere at the Sacramento Theater Company, April 2013.
- A Little Princess, Princess Musicals – Book and Lyrics by Michael Hjort, Music by Camille Curtis.
- Sara Crewe, premiered in May 2007 at Needham (Boston, MA) Community Theater, first full production in November 2007 at the Blackwell Playhouse, Marietta, Georgia; music, lyrics, and book by Miriam Raiken-Kolb and Elizabeth Ellor
- Sara Crewe: A Little Princess, Wheelock Family Theatre, Boston, 2006; music and libretto by Susan Kosoff and Jane Staab
- A Little Princess, TheatreWorks, Palo Alto, California, premiered in 2004; music by Andrew Lippa; book by Brian Crawley; directed by Susan H. Schulman
- A Little Princess, Wings Theatre, (Off-Broadway, New York, 2003) Book and Direction by Robert Sickinger; music and lyrics by Mel Atkey, musical director/arranger/pianist Mary Ann Ivan
- A Little Princess, Children's Musical Theater San Jose, May 2002. Book and lyrics by Tegan McLane, music by Richard Link
- A Little Princess, Bodens Youth Theatre, London, premiering February 2012; music and lyrics by Marc Folan, book by Adam Boden
  - Off-Broadway U.S. Premiere, The Hudson Guild Theater, NYC, May 2014

Some of these productions have made significant changes to the book, story and characters, most notably the Sickinger/Atkey version, which moves the action to Civil War-era America.

In addition, Princesses, a 2004 musical currently in development for Broadway, features students at a boarding school presenting a production of A Little Princess. Music and book was by Cheri Steinkellner and Bill Steinkellner, and lyrics and direction by David Zippel.

=== Other theatre ===
- The London Children's Ballet performed ballet adaptions in 1995 (Choreographer: Harold King), 2004 (Choreographer: Vanessa Fenton) and 2012 (Choreographer: Samantha Raine).
- A theatre adaptation by John Vreeke was produced by the New York State Theatre Institute and recorded as an audio book in 1999.
- A theatre adaptation by Belt Up Theatre was performed at the Edinburgh Fringe Festival 2012 as 'Belt Up Theatre's A Little Princess'.
- An adaptation of the book, entitled Sara Crewe: The Little Princess was written by Steve Hays and was featured at CityStage in Springfield MA, performing six shows and starred Carlie Daggett in The title role.
- A theatre adaptation was written by Lauren Nichols and performed by all for One productions, inc., with original music composed by a young girl, Torilinn Cwanek, at the Allen County Public Library Auditorium in Fort Wayne, Indiana, in February 2013, performing six shows.
- Hess Oster's adaptation for youth performers (StagePlays, 2013) has been performed by STARS Drama (2013), Actor's Youth Theatre (2013), Bordentown Theatre (2014), Fruits of the Spirit Academy (2015), Mosaic Children's Theatre (2015), and Shine Performing Arts (2017).

=== Radio drama ===
- A Little Princess is a radio adaptation in two parts of 57 minutes each, produced by BBC Radio 4 and directed by Jonquil Panting, first broadcast in 2017.

=== Related books ===
In 1995, Apple published a series of three books written by Gabrielle Charbonnet. "The Princess Trilogy" was an updated version of the classic, with the title character named Molly, rather than Sara. Molly Stewart's father was a famous film director who left his daughter in a posh upscale boarding school. There were three books in the series, which ended in a similar way as the original: Molly's Heart, The Room on the Attic, and Home at Last.

A sequel by Hilary McKay was published by Hodder Children's Books in September 2009: Wishing for Tomorrow: The Sequel to A Little Princess. It tells the story of what happened to the rest of the boarding school girls after Sara and Becky left ("life must go on at Miss Minchin's").

In 2017 a further sequel was published by Scholastic, The Princess and the Suffragette by Holly Webb. This centres on Lottie, the smallest girl in the original story, who is now 10 and learning about the Suffragettes. Sara makes some brief appearances.

=== Games ===
- A Little Lily Princess is a retelling of the classic novel in visual novel form with a yuri twist. It was released for the PC in May 2016 by the independent video game developer Hanako Games.
