= Sarah Stilwell Weber =

American illustrator and artist

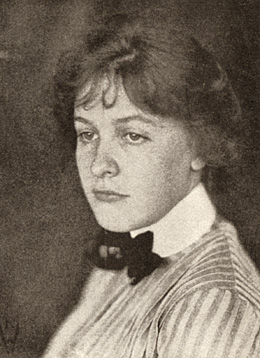
- Sarah Stilwell Weber, photograph, circa 1902
- Born: Sarah S. Stilwell; 1878 (Note: Her year of birth is consistently published as 1878, but her death certificate (Sarah S. Stilwell Weber, died April 4, 1939 in Philadelphia, wife of Herbert S. Weber) and travel documents show that she was born on September 15, 1877. Also from the death certificate, her parents were William and Isabel Ford Stilwell, both born in Pennsylvania.); Concordville, Pennsylvania
- Died: April 6, 1939 (Note: Her Saturday Evening Post biography states that she died on April 6, 1939. Her death certificate, however, states that she died on April 4, 1939 and that she was buried in Woodlands Cemetery in Philadelphia, Pennsylvania on April 6, 1939.); Philadelphia, Pennsylvania
- Education: Drexel Institute
- Known for: Illustrator
- Spouse: Herbert Weber

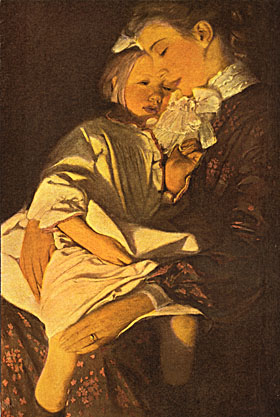
Sarah Stilwell Weber, By the Evening Fire, 1904

Sarah Stilwell Weber (1878 – April 6, 1939) was an American illustrator who studied at Drexel Institute under Howard Pyle. She illustrated books and national magazines, like The Saturday Evening Post, Vogue, and The Century Magazine.

== Early life ==
Sarah S. Stilwell was born in Concordville, Pennsylvania. She was described affectionately by her nephews and nieces for her love of children and her positive, "self-effacing" and imaginative personality.

== Education ==
In 1897, Weber attended Drexel Institute, where illustrator Howard Pyle was an innovative and popular teacher. Pyle, as a result, could be selective about the students that he admitted to his classes. He wrote Edward Penfield, who was his friend and the art director at Harper's Bazaar that he required his students to have strong abilities in color and drawing, artistic ability, and imagination. If they did not excel in each of these areas, he would not accept them as a student.

Drexel Institute established a scholarship fund for Pyle's most accomplished students to attend an art program at Chadd’s Ford on the Brandywine. In 1899, Weber won a scholarship for a summer residential art program in a non-competitive, relaxed environment. Of that summer's program, Pyle said that his students benefited from the natural, relaxed setting that allowed them to progress more as artists in a couple of months than they would have in a year of classroom study. The Saturday Evening Post stated that "[m]any of the Brandywine School artists had a flair for capturing grace and detail of the Victorian Era yet not letting decoration and detail overwhelm the subject matter."

Weber was one of Pyle's favorite students. She was among the first artists to live at his studio in Wilmington, Delaware in 1900. Others included Stanley Arthurs, Ethel Franklin Betts, Frank Schoonover, and Dorothy Warren. Pyle recommended that Weber focus on her life as an artist, rather than marry. Pyle helped her market her work in New York, as he did with other of his top students.

== Career ==
She was a member of The Plastic Club, which was founded in 1897 by Elizabeth Shippen Green, Violet Oakley, and Jessie Willcox Smith and was initially formed as a women's art association for the promotion and exhibition of visual (plastic) arts. Weber illustrated Josephine Daskam's article "A Christmas Hymn for Children", which was printed in the December 1902 issue of The Century Magazine.

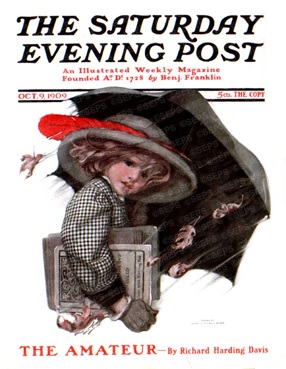
Sarah Stilwell Weber, "Girl with Schoolbooks Walking in Rain with Umbrella", The Saturday Evening Post, October 9, 1909

In 1904, The Saturday Evening Post began hiring women to illustrate the covers of their magazine. Weber illustrated 60 of the magazine's covers starting with New Year’s Number, 1904 on December 31, 1904, and ending with Swinging in the Apple Tree on the August 15, 1925, issue. Although she had been offered the ability to contract for scheduled covers, Weber preferred to complete her works to her satisfaction, rather than being constrained by deadlines. She created illustrations of young children, capturing their enthusiastic and delighted faces while playing. The Saturday Evening Post stated that she was "particularly adept at creating movement and flow that gave the impression of coming and going... [and] that the subject would dance off the page in the next moment." The images of young girls were often depicted like little women, engaged in charming scenes, like flying kites, watering roses, or cuddling cats. Weber was one of several talented illustrators—like J. C. Leyendecker, Neysa McMein, Anita Parkhurst, C. Coles Phillips and Cushman Parker—created illustrations of the weekly magazine, which in the early 20th century was limited to a two-color printing process.

Weber also created covers for The Country Gentleman and Vogue magazine. She also illustrated articles and covers for Harper's Bazaar, Collier's, and St. Nicholas Magazines.

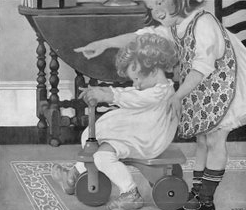
Sarah Stilwell Weber, Kiddie Kar, 1919 magazine illustration

Weber illustrated advertisements for Rit Dyes, Scranton Lace Company, Wamsutta Mills and H-O Oats. Weber collaborated with Herbert, her husband, on The Musical Tree. Herbert wrote the poems and music and Sara created the illustrations for the children's book. By 1921, she had created a series of illustrations called Kiddie Kars, which at that time were owned by H. C. White Company. Her full-page color illustrations were published in The Kiddie-Kar Book, in which the verses were written by Richard J. Walsh.

In 1910, The New York Times published an article "A Latter-Day Industry and Its Rewards: How a Group of Illustrators is Making Fortunes by Drawing Pictures of the 'Modern Woman'" in which Weber was estimated to be tied for the second highest paid woman illustrator with Elizabeth Shippen Green, each estimated to make US$10,000 per year (estimated equivalent to $345,536 in 2025). (Note: The {{inflation}} calculation is only an estimate and is only capable of inflating Consumer Price Index values: staples, workers' rent, small service bills (doctor's costs, train tickets). This template is incapable of inflating capital expenses, government expenses, or the personal wealth and expenditure of the rich.) Jessie Willcox Smith was said to be the highest paid women illustrator, making $15,000 in 1910. One magazine editor stated that the women's income was on the same level as a Supreme Court Justice. They had their own distinctive style and portrayed children from a woman's perspective.

Along with Ethel Franklin Betts and Jessie Willcox Smith, Weber was one of the best known magazine and book illustrators in the early 20th century. She, Anita Parkhurst, and Jessie Willcox Smith were among a group of woman artists—with Lucile Patterson Marsh and Ruth Eastman—to have had distinctive careers as illustrators.

== Death ==
Sarah Stilwell Weber died at her Philadelphia home in April 1939.

In 1975 her works were included in a 90 painting exhibition entitled "Women Illustrators in the Howard Pyle Tradition" held at the Brandywine River Museum from September through November. Other artists included Violet Oakley, Elizabeth Shippen Green, Jessie Willcox Smith, Alice Barber Stephens, Elenore Plaisted Abbott, Anna Whelan Betts, Ethel Franklin Betts, Elizabeth F. Bonsall, Charlotte Harding, Olive Rush, and Katharine Pyle.

From January 27 – February 21, 2014, an exhibition of her work and nine other artists were exhibited at "Women Illustrators in the Golden Age of Illustration, 1880-1920" at the Barrett Art Gallery in Utica College, New York. The original works exhibited were from the Jay Williams American Print Collection. The other illustrators were Jessie Willcox Smith, Alice Barber Stephens, May Wilson Preston, Violet Oakley, Elizabeth Shippen Green, Mary Hallock Foote, Maginel Wright Enright, Florence Scovel Shinn, and Anna Whelan Betts.

== Collections ==
- Brandywine River Museum – Fairy Godmother, illustration for Edith B. Sturgis' "The Child in Fairyland", published in Scribner's, December 1907
- Delaware Art Museum – Vogue magazine cover, c. 1914
- Dodd, Mead and Company – A New Day, 1905

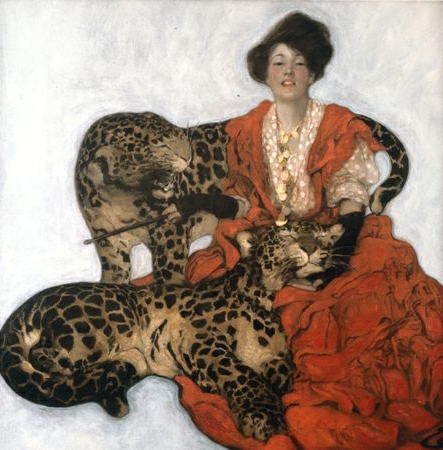
Sarah Stilwell Weber, "Woman with Leopards", Collier's, March 17, 1906, cover

- The Kelly Collection – Lady with Leopards, printed on Collier's, March 17, 1906, issue
- Library of Congress Division of Prints and Photographs – illustration of Josephine Daskin's article "A Christmas Hymn for Children", which was printed in The Century Magazine December 1902 issue
- National Museum of American Illustration

== Published works ==
- Ellen Olney Kirk (1898). Dorothy Deane: A Children's Story. Sarah Stilwell Weber (illustrator). Boston: Houghton, Mifflin and Company. OCLC 1814432.
- Mary Mapes Dodge (1904). Rhymes and Jingles. Sarah Stilwell Weber (illustrator). American Art Archives, Smithsonian Institution. OCLC 2928342.
- Edward Sandford Martin (1904). Luxury of Children & Some Other Luxuries. Sarah Stilwell Weber (illustrator). New York, London: Harper & Brothers. OCLC 2687688.
- Georgia Alexander (1909). Child Classics: The First Reader. Sarah Stilwell Weber (illustrator). Indianapolis: Bobbs-Merrill Company. OCLC 51484847., primary school book
- Georgia Alexander (1909). Child Classics: The Second Reader. Alice Barber Stephens, Sarah Stilwell Weber, Sarah K Smith (illustrators). Indianapolis: Bobbs-Merrill Company. OCLC 759398387., primary school book
- Ethel C. Dow (1910). Mother's Hero. Sarah Stilwell Weber, Isabel Lyndall (illustrators). Philadelphia: Edward Stern. OCLC 859872407.
- Richard J. Walsh (1920). The Kiddie-Kar Book. Sarah Stilwell Weber (illustrator). Philadelphia: J.B. Lippincott. OCLC 179260547.
- Herbert Weber (1925). The Musical Tree. Sarah Stilwell Weber (illustrator). OCLC 20680109., illustrated children's song book

== Gallery ==
Sarah Stilwell Cover Illustrations

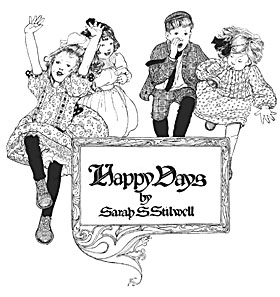
Happy Days, pen and ink, book title page, 1902

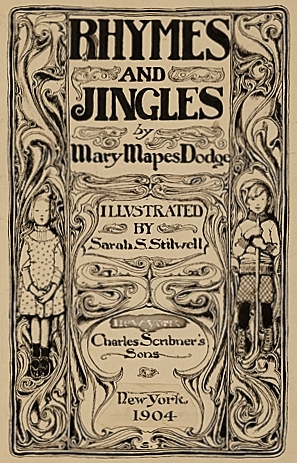
Rhymes and Jingles, book cover design, 1904

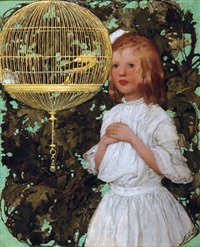
"Love at First Sight", Associated Sunday Magazine cover October 8, 1905 issue

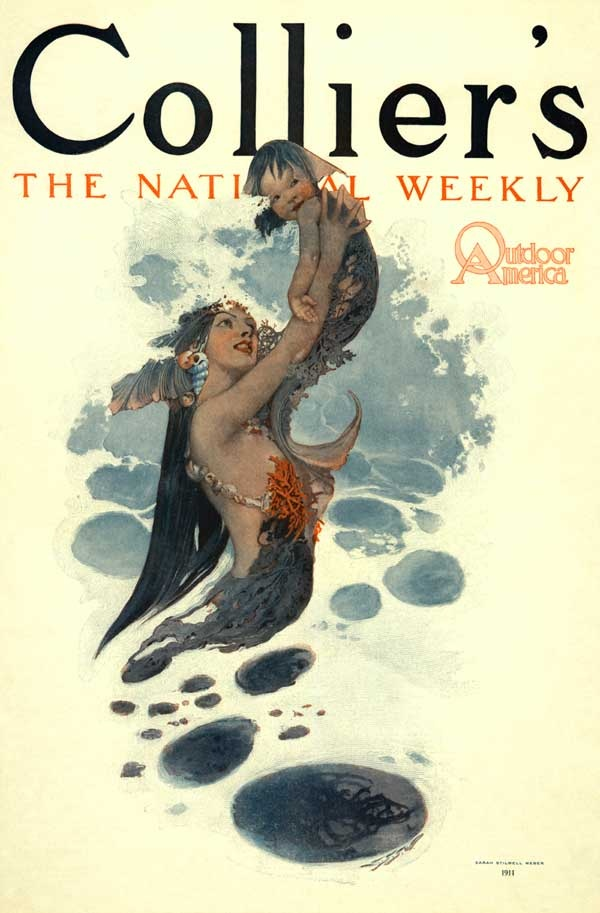
Collier's cover, 1911
