= John Foster Kirk =

American historian, journalist, educator and bibliographer (1824 – 1904)

- Born: March 23, 1824 Fredericton, New Brunswick, Canada
- Died: 1904 (aged 79–80)
- Spouse: Ellen Olney Kirk (1879–death)

John Foster Kirk (March 23, 1824, Fredericton, New Brunswick – 1904) was an American historian, journalist, educator and bibliographer.

Kirk was educated privately in Nova Scotia and came to the United States in 1842. From 1847 to 1859 he was secretary to the historian William H. Prescott, accompanying Prescott to Europe in 1850 and editing Prescott's works after his death. He contributed to the North American Review, the Atlantic Monthly, and other periodicals. He was elected as a member to the American Philosophical Society in 1864. In 1870 he moved to Philadelphia, where he edited Lippincott's Monthly Magazine from 1870 to 1886. In 1886, he became lecturer in European History at the University of Pennsylvania. In 1891 he published a two-volume Supplement to Samuel Austin Allibone's Critical dictionary of English literature.

In 1879, Kirk married his second wife, novelist Ellen Warner Olney, daughter of the geographer Jesse Olney. They were married until Kirk's death in 1904.

== Works ==
- A History of Charles the Bold, Duke of Burgundy, 3 vols, 8vo, 1863–67.
- (ed.) Works of William H. Prescott, 1870–1874.
- A supplement to Allibone's Critical dictionary of English literature and British and American authors. Containing over thirty-seven thousand articles (authors), and enumerating over ninety-three thousand titles, 1891
