= Lucile Marsh =

Lucile Marsh may refer to:

- Lucile Patterson Marsh, American illustrator (1890–1978)
- Lucile Marsh Murray, American dance writer and businesswoman (1899–1982)

== See also ==
- Lucile M. Morsch, American librarian (1906–1972)
