= Mel Atkey =

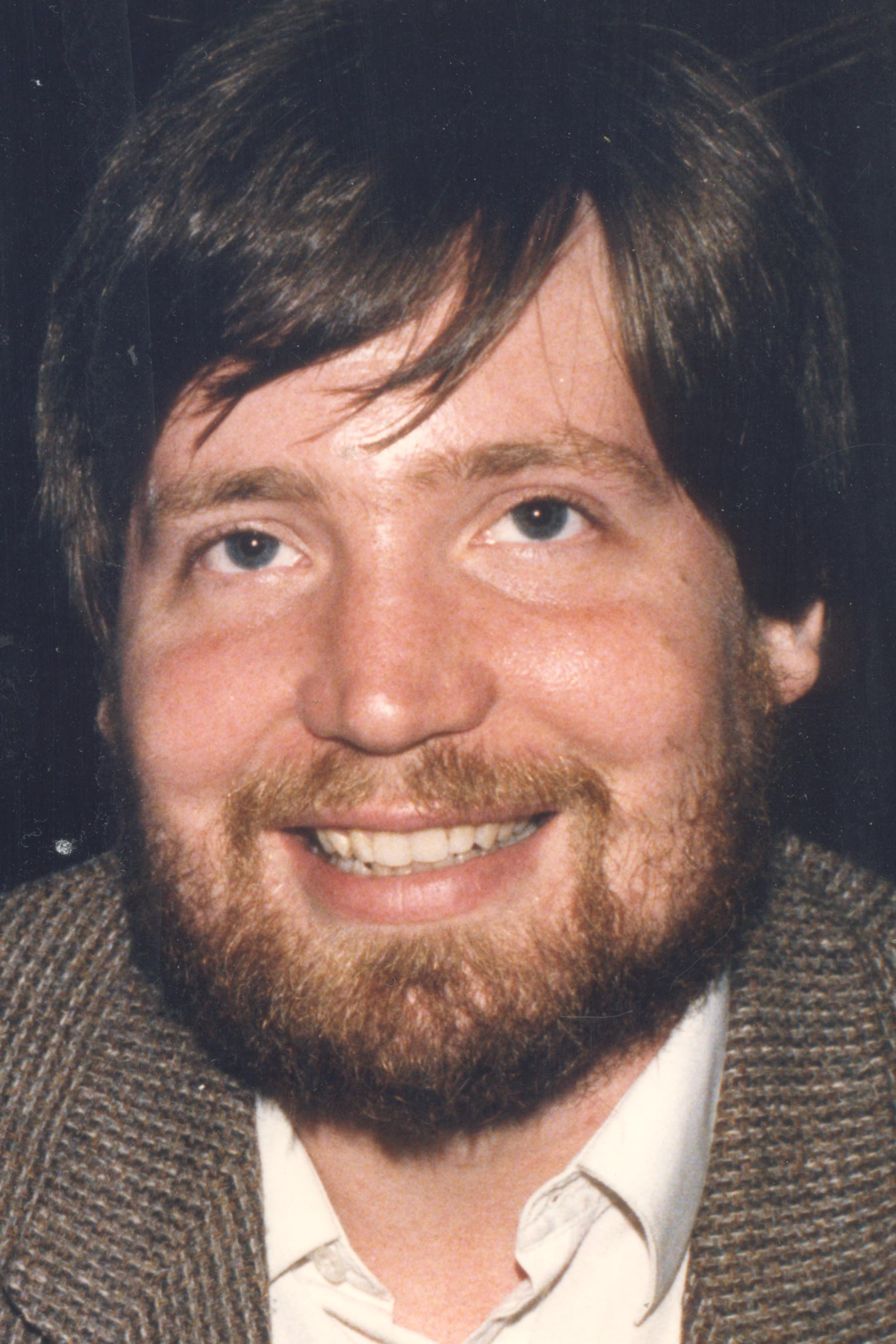

Background information
- Born: June 16, 1958; Ladner, British Columbia, Canada
- Died: December 16, 2022 (aged 64) (death date 1st)
- Genre: Musical theatre
- Occupations: Composer, Lyricist, Author
- Website: melatkey.com

Louis Melville Atkey (born June 16, 1958, in Vancouver, British Columbia - December 16, 2022) was a Canadian-born, English-emigrated musical theatre composer and lyricist. He began to write musicals while still in high school. After college he became a theatre critic in Canada, and continued to write musicals and songs while serving as director of Cabaret and Musical Theater Alliance until he moved to London in 1991. He is a member of the Writers' Union of Canada and Mercury Musical Developments. He was a finalist for the Musical of the Year competition in Aarhus, Denmark, and his work has been short-listed for the Vivian Ellis Prize, the Quest for New Musicals, the Ken Hill Prize and Musical Stairs.

== Life and career ==
Atkey was born to Ken (1927-2014) and Marion (1928-2022) Atkey (née Holmes), a commercial artist and a teacher respectively, in Vancouver, British Columbia, and grew up in neighbouring Ladner where he attended Delta Secondary School. During his high school years, Atkey began writing musicals, and continued to do so while attending Langara College in Vancouver. He gained his MA in Musical Theatre at Goldsmiths, University of London.

In 1977, Atkey co-produced a jazz concert with Vancouver impresario Willi Germann and a telethon featuring folk singer Tom Northcott. Atkey's first musical, Shikara, was produced on the radio in Canada. A single was released by singer Janice Jaud of one of the songs, "Far Away", and received airplay across Canada and the U.S. Atkey spent two years as a theatre critic in Vancouver before moving to Toronto to pursue musical theatre writing. He was commissioned to write songs for CBC Radio, and was a member of the Lehman Engel Musical Theater Workshop. He was a director of the Cabaret and Musical Theatre Alliance until he moved to London in 1991.

He made his New York debut in April 2001 with an Off-off-Broadway showcase of O Pioneers! with a book by Robert Sickinger, founder of Chicago's famed Hull House Theatre. This show was then a finalist for "Stages 2002" at the New Tuners theatre in Chicago. When their second musical, A Little Princess, was presented at Wings Theatre in New York in 2003, the New York Times said, "Mel Atkey, who wrote the score and lyrics, has composed lovely music". His two-character musical, Perfect Timing, for which he wrote the book as well as music and lyrics, was showcased in 2005 as part of Greenwich Theatre’s Musical Futures series in London. He wrote the opening number for Janie Dee’s critically acclaimed one-woman show. His book, When We Both Got to Heaven, tells the story of his ancestor James Atkey, who came to Georgian Bay from the Isle of Wight in 1854 as a teacher to the Ojibwe. It was published by Natural Heritage Books, Toronto, in October 2002. A second book, Broadway North: The Dream of a Canadian Musical Theatre, was published by Natural Heritage in 2006. He achieved his Master of Arts in Musical Theatre from Goldsmiths, University of London in 2016.

He died unexpectedly on or about December 16, 2022. No cause was stated. His obituary was attributed to his siblings.

== Works ==
- O Pioneers! (2001), musical with music and lyrics by Atkey and a book by Robert Sickinger
- When We Both Got to Heaven: James Atkey among the Anishnabek at Colpoy's Bay (2002), Natural Heritage Books, Toronto
- A Little Princess (2003), musical with music and lyrics by Atkey and a book by Robert Sickinger
- Broadway North: The Dream of a Canadian Musical Theater (2006), Natural Heritage Books, Toronto
- A Million Miles from Broadway: Musical Theatre Beyond New York and London - Revised and Expanded Edition (2019), Friendlysong Books, Vancouver
- Running Away with the Circus (or, "Now is the Winter of our Missing Tent") (2013), Friendlysong Books, Vancouver
- Breaking into Song (2015) Friendlysong Books, Vancouver

His other musicals include Shikara (broadcast on radio), and Perfect Timing (showcased at Greenwich Theatre, London, 2005). He has written songs for CBC Radio and for Janie Dee.
