= Ethel Franklin Betts =

American illustrator

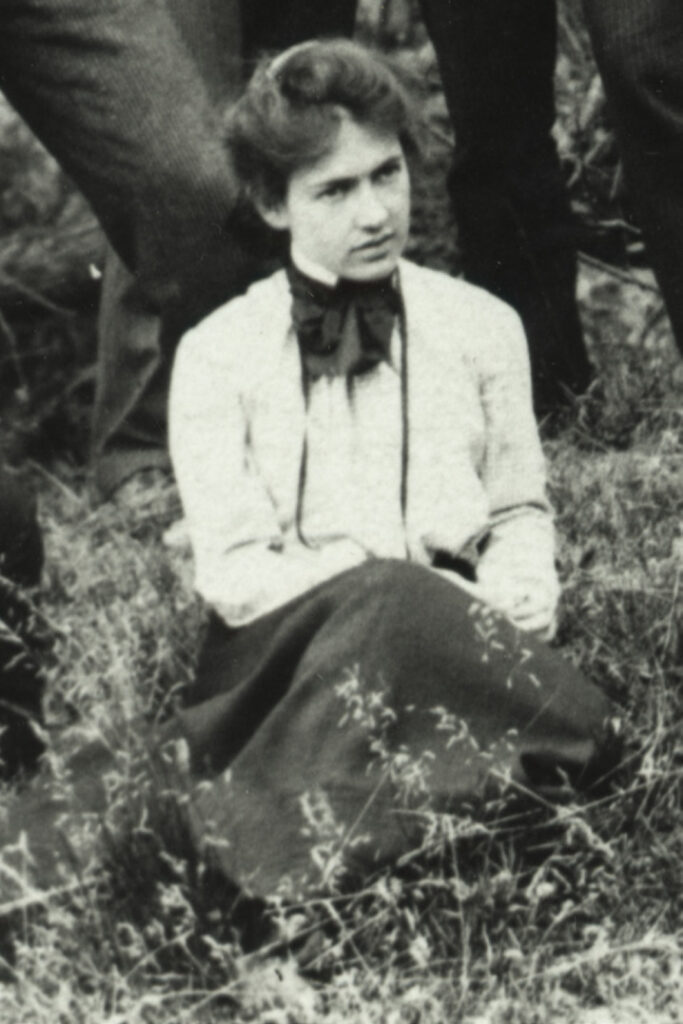
- Betts in 1902
- Born: September 6, 1877; Philadelphia, Pennsylvania, US
- Died: October 9, 1959 (aged 82); Philadelphia, Pennsylvania, US
- Education: Pennsylvania Academy of the Fine Arts; Drexel Institute
- Known for: Illustrations
- Movement: The Golden Age of Illustration

Ethel Franklin Betts Bains (September 6, 1877 – October 9, 1959) was an American illustrator primarily of children's books during the Golden Age of American Illustration in the late 19th and early 20th centuries.

== Life ==
=== Early life and education ===
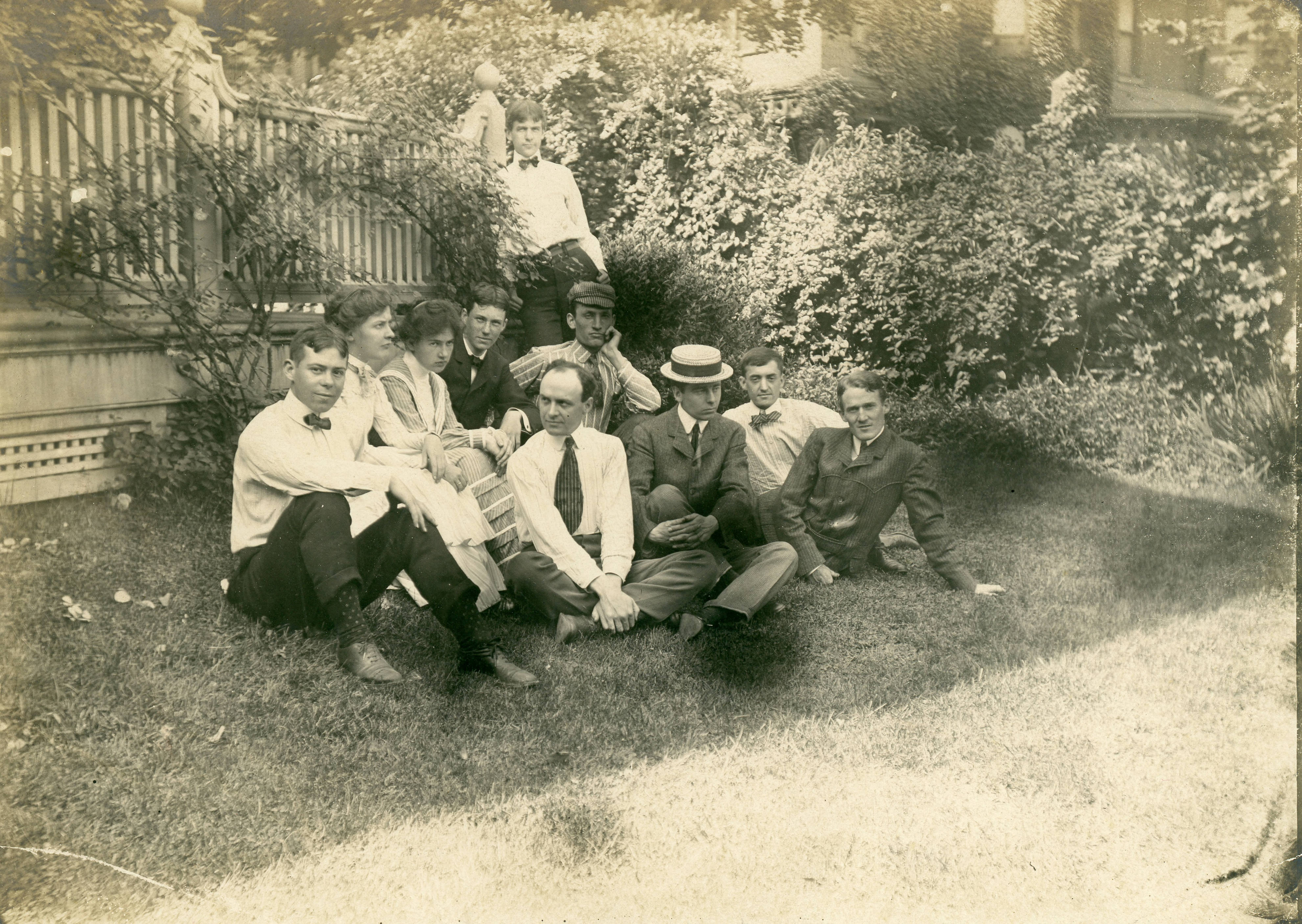
Betts (sitting third from left) in front of Pyle's studio in Wilmington, Delaware, 1901

Ethel Franklin Betts was born on September 6, 1877, in Philadelphia, Pennsylvania, the youngest daughter of doctor Thomas Betts and housekeeper Alice Whelan. Illustrator Anna Whelan Betts was her older sister.

Betts attended the Pennsylvania Academy of the Fine Arts before enrolling in illustrator and teacher Howard Pyle's class at Drexel Institute in 1899. Betts, accompanied by her sister Anna and mutual friend Dorothy Warren, established a studio near Pyle's after he moved to Wilmington, Delaware. Her stay in Wilmington spanned two winters, the latter of which she spent as a guest in Pyle's home.

=== Marriage ===
After leaving Wilmington, Betts worked in a studio in her parents' barn until she married Edward Bains (August 2, 1874 – July 10, 1949), the executive of the hosiery manufacturing company Barger, Bains & Munn, on September 20, 1909. On July 11, 1910, she gave birth to her daughter Sarah Mellor Bains, who died at six months old from acute otitis media, a pneumonia infection of the middle ear.

=== Career ===
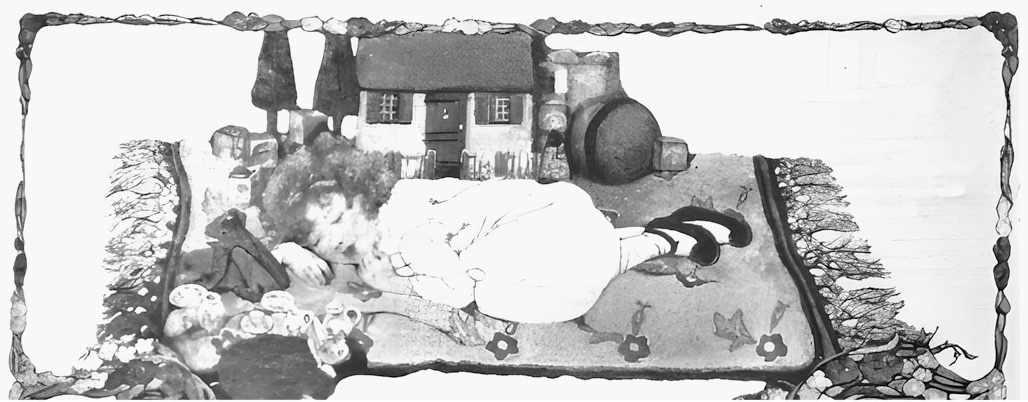
Decoration by Betts for "When Baby Slept" by Riley in Collier's, 1915

In the 1900s, Betts gained prominence alongside other women illustrators such as Sarah Stilwell Weber and Jessie Willcox Smith. According to Betts herself, she and her colleagues "entered the field at the time color illustration was reaching its height and came into full flower". Even with greater recognition, the works of women illustrators were still subject to both positive and negative gendered criticism.

Betts first gained work illustrating magazines, including St. Nicholas Magazine, McClure's, and Collier's. Beginning in 1904, she was commissioned to illustrate several books including, James Whitcomb Riley's The Raggedy Man, While the Heart Beats Young, and Frances Hodgson Burnett's A Little Princess. She reduced her commercial work after getting married. She continued to work as a portraitist and exhibited her portfolio, occasionally submitting illustrations to House & Garden and The Saturday Evening Post. She was awarded a bronze medal for her illustration of The Story of the Six Swans at the 1915 Panama–Pacific International Exposition.

Betts was a member of both the Philadelphia Water Color Club (WCC) and the Fellowship of the Pennsylvania Academy of the Fine Arts, where she continued to exhibit through the 1920s. Betts received the Carol H. Beck Medal in 1922 for presenting the best portrait.

=== Death ===
Betts died from a cardiovascular hemorrhage in Philadelphia on October 9, 1959, at the age of eighty-two. Betts willed the bulk of her estate to the Germantown Hospital, Visiting Nurse Association, Overbrook School for the Blind and Volunteer Service to the Blind.

== Selected works ==
=== Illustrations ===
Literature

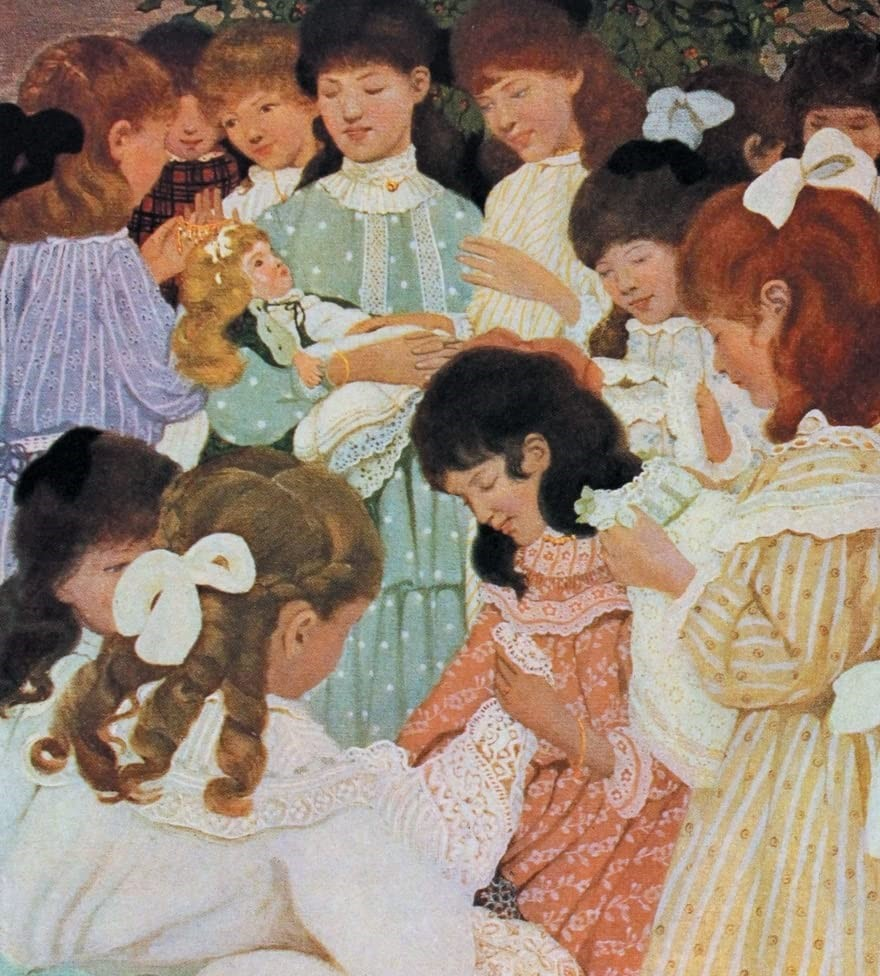
A Little Princess: Being the Whole Story of Sara Crewe Now Being Told for the First Time by Frances Hodgson Burnett, 1905

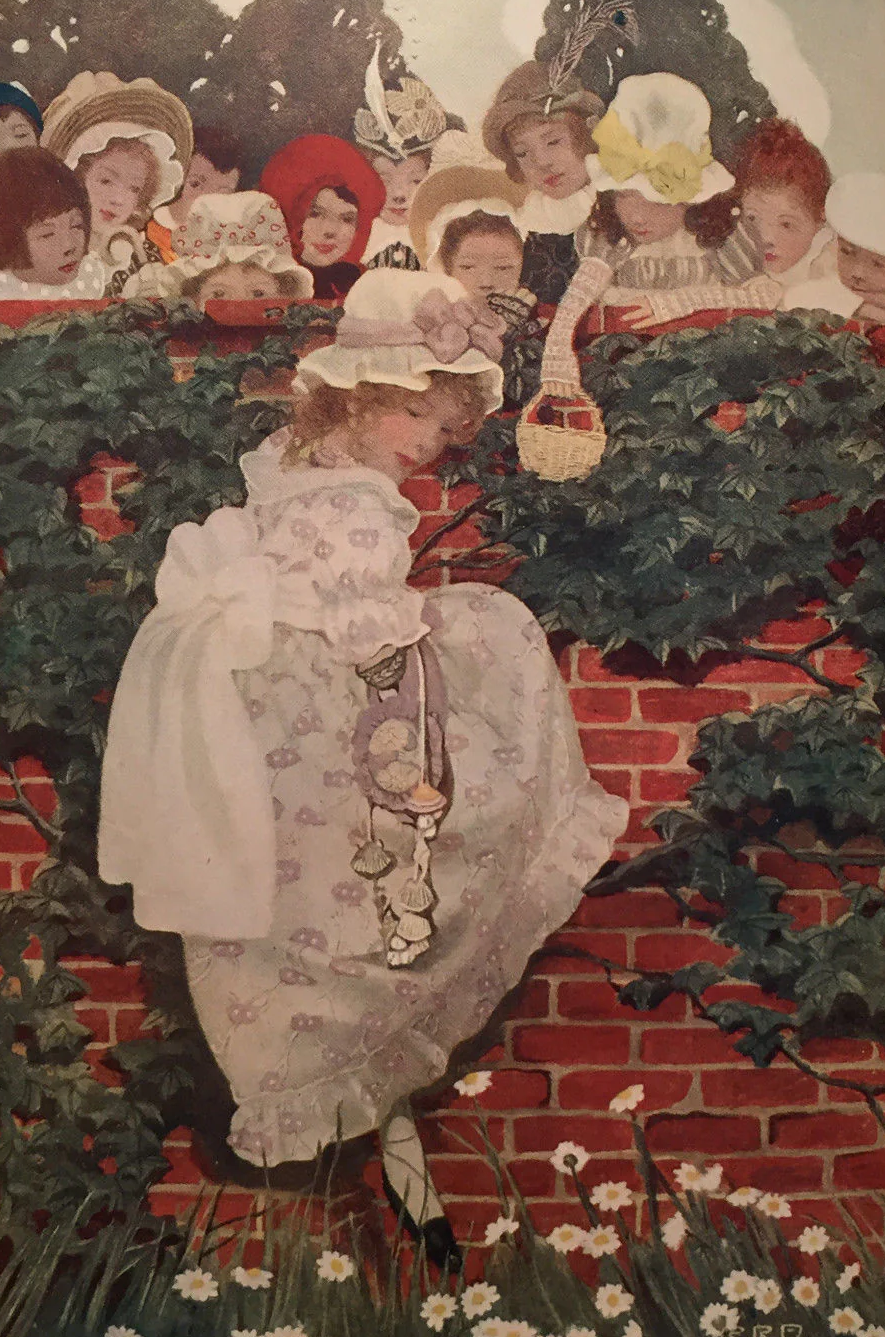
Babes in Toyland by Glen MacDonough and Anna Alice Chapin, 1904

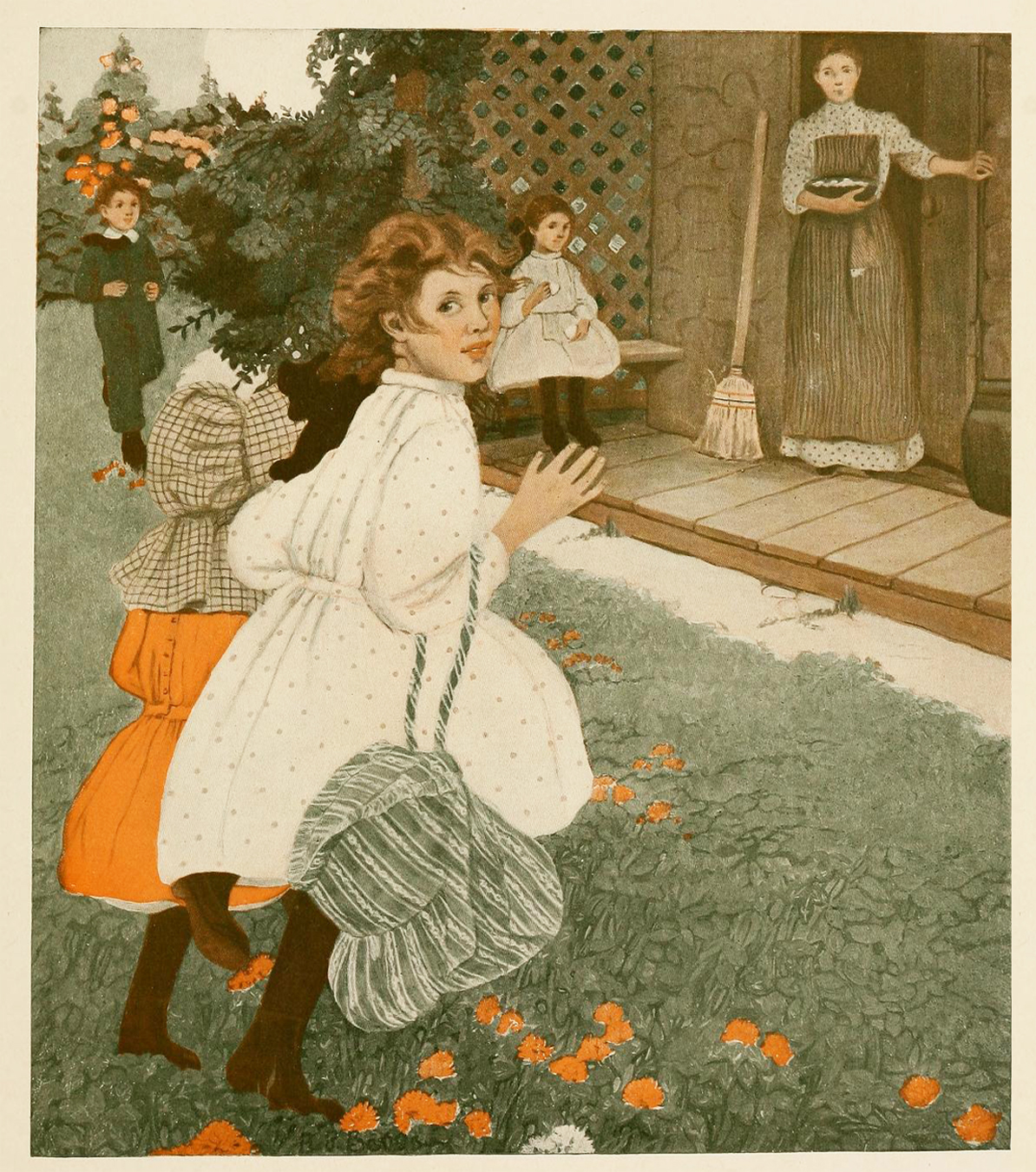
The Orphant Annie Book by James Whitcomb Riley, 1908
Magazines

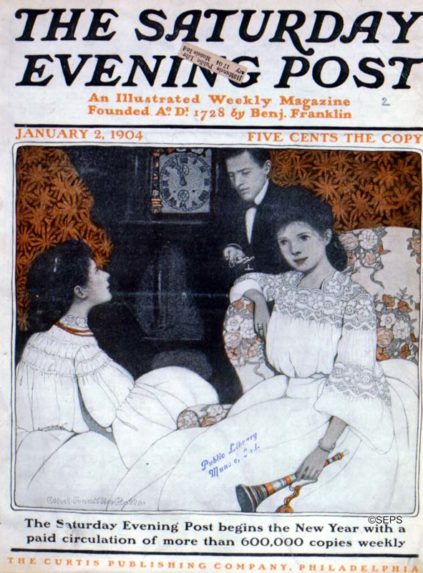
Cover art for the January 2, 1904 issue of The Saturday Evening Post

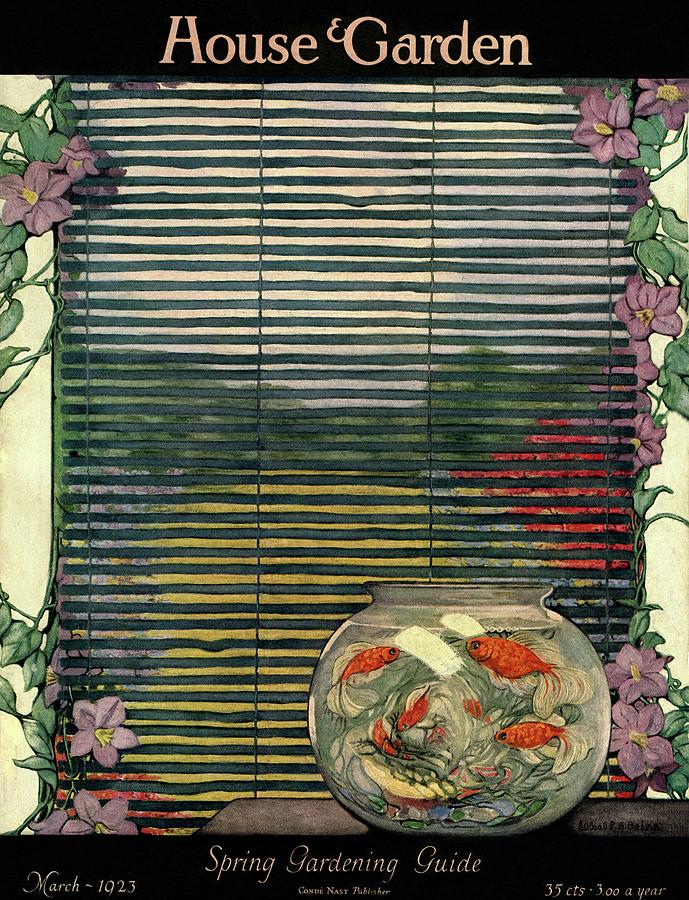
Cover art for Volume 43, No. 3 of House & Garden, 1923

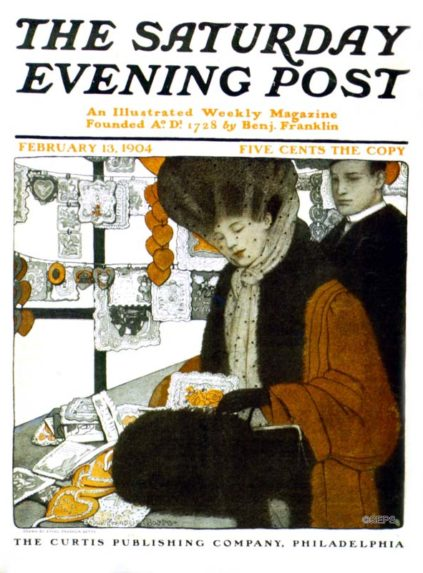
Cover art for the February 13, 1904 issue of The Saturday Evening Post
