= Solebury School =

Location
- 6832 Phillips Mill Rd; New Hope, Bucks, Pennsylvania 18938-9682; United States; 40.3802°N 74.9892°W

Information
- Type: Independent day & boarding school
- Religious affiliation: Nonsectarian
- Established: September 1925; 101 years ago
- Status: Currently operational
- Superintendent: Anette Miller
- CEEB code: 392955
- NCES School ID: 01197388
- Head of school: Tom Wilschutz
- Faculty: 47.9 (on an FTE basis)
- Grades: 9–12
- Enrollment: 218 (2019–2020)
  - Grade 9: 43
  - Grade 10: 53
  - Grade 11: 60
  - Grade 12: 62
- Student to teacher ratio: 4.6
- Hours in school day: 9.2
- Campus type: Rural
- Athletics conference: Penn-Jersey Athletic Association
- Nickname: Spartans
- Annual tuition: $45,180 (day); $66,920 (boarding)
- Affiliation: NAIS
- Website: solebury.org

Solebury School is a co-educational private boarding and day school located on a 140-acre (57 ha) campus in Solebury Township, Pennsylvania, in the United States. Solebury School's academic program features a college-preparatory curriculum with courses and electives in various subjects and a focus on interdisciplinary and experiential education models.

== History ==
=== 20th century ===
Solebury School was conceived by Robert Shaw, Laurie Erskine, Julian Lathrop, and Arthur Washburn in the early 1920s. It opened in September 1925 in rented quarters with four boys and four teachers. A year later, the founders purchased Michener Farm, which remains the institution's site. In 1949, the school merged with another local school, the Holmquist School for Girls, which had a similar educational philosophy and often shared events and productions. Solebury is often described as a socially progressive or liberal institution.

In the 1980s, a local activist and noted anarchist Abbie Hoffman would give speeches to the student body.

=== 21st century ===
The school hosts LGBTQ groups; it produced an entry about bullying for the It Gets Better Project in 2011 and has an active campus club focused on sexuality that students and teachers attend together. By participating annually in a local AIDS fundraiser walk, Solebury School has raised thousands of dollars for AIDS organizations.

==== Sexual abuse ====
In 2014, after several alumni claimed they had been sexually abused as students at Solebury, including by the current head gym coach, the school publicly issued a letter of acknowledgment and apology to them by mail in 2014. In a second letter to alumni and parents, the school revealed its chief founder, Robert Shaw, had sexual relationships with his students.

On January 26, 2017, Bucks County published the results of a 2015 grand jury investigation detailing testimony considered credible by the district attorney from six former students alleging sexual abuse at Solebury School from the 1950s through 2005, identifying nine living adults formerly connected with the school who could be prosecuted. The report was critical of the Solebury School's campus culture as facilitating the abuse.

Before this, in the mid-1990s, there was a public sexual abuse scandal at Solebury between a music teacher and an underage student, which was settled in a civil suit in 1998.

== Notable faculty ==
- Anna Whelan Betts, Victorian style illustrator
- Jonathan Miles - Novelist, Harmonicist (Writer-in-Residence)

== Notable alumni ==
- Joyce Bulifant '56 - Actress
- Andrew Bynum - NBA All Star
- Shaun Cassidy - Actor and Producer
- Peter Hobbs - Actor
- Robert Kenner '68 - Emmy-winning documentary filmmaker
- James MacArthur '56 - Actor
- Alexa McDonough ‘62 - Politician
- Margaret Mead - Anthropologist
- Jill Nelson - Journalist and writer
- Elizabeth Pitcairn '91 - Classical violinist
- Peggy Shepard - Environmental justice activist
- Langhorne Slim - Musician, songwriter
