= Samantha Raine =

English dance teacher and ballerina

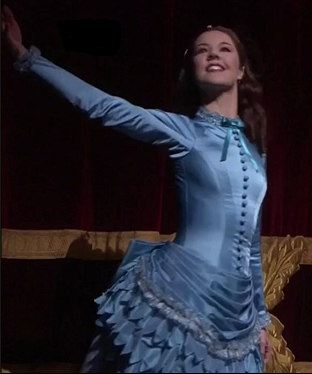
- in Alice in Wonderland (2011)
- Born: Yorkshire
- Occupation: Ballet Mistress at the Royal Ballet

Samantha Raine is an English dance teacher and a retired ballerina. She is the ballet mistress of the Royal Ballet, at the Royal Opera House, in London's Covent Garden, having previously been a soloist with the Company.

== Early life and education ==
Samantha Raine was born in Yorkshire and began dancing at the age of two. She learned to dance, along with her sister, at the Kirkham Henry (KH) Performing Arts Centre, in Malton. Raine's sister, Pippa Raine, also dances professionally, usually in West End musicals.

Raine trained at the Royal Ballet School from the age of eleven, beginning in the Lower School, at the White Lodge in Richmond. Whilst a student, she won the Kenneth MacMillan Choreographic Award, in 1995, and the inaugural Dame Ninette de Valois Award, in 1998.

== Career ==
=== Ballerina ===
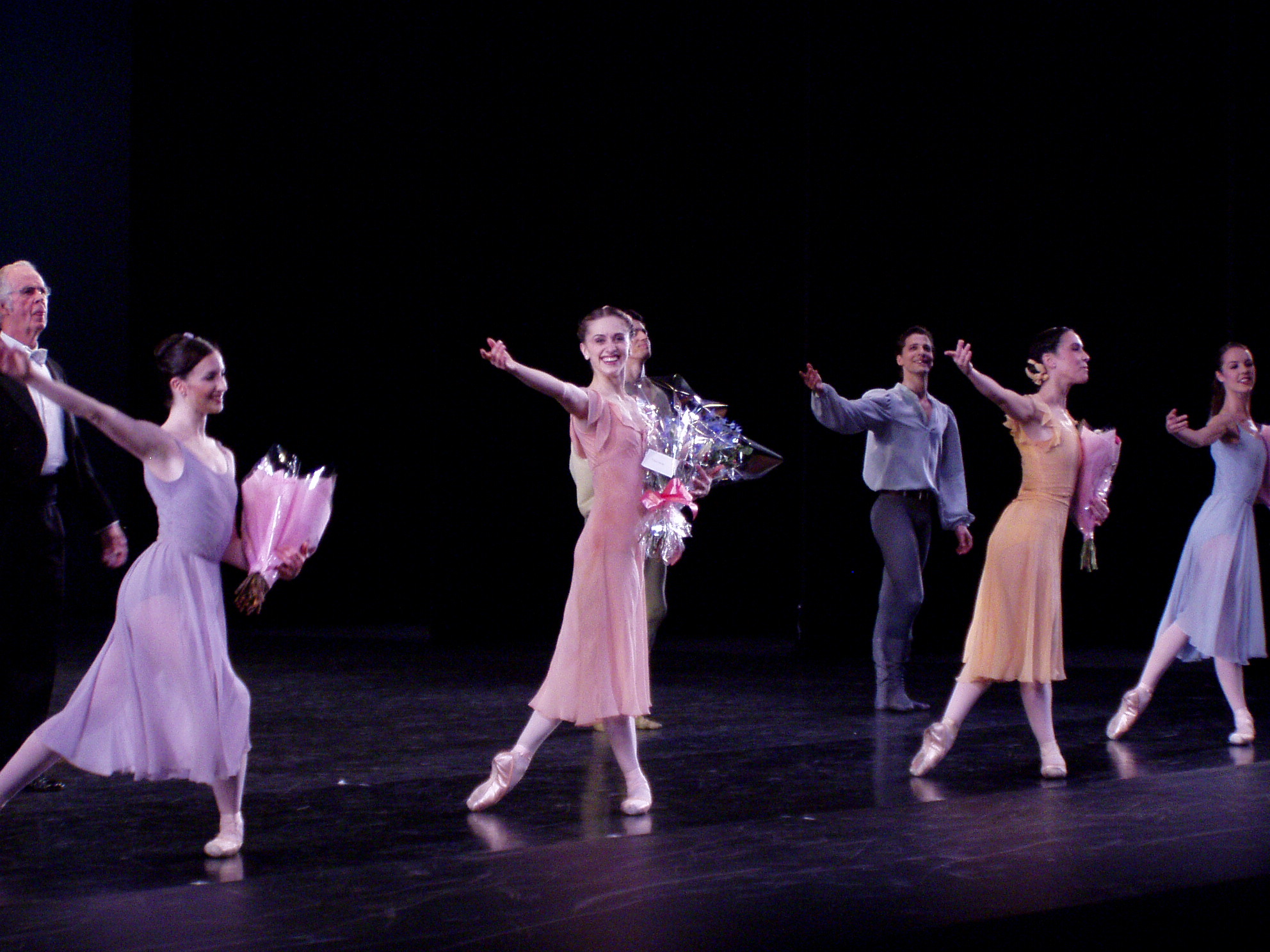
Dances at a Gathering, Royal Ballet. Raine is on the right

Raine graduated into the Royal Ballet in 1997. The Company is based at the Royal Opera House, in Covent Garden, London. She was promoted to First Artist in 2001 and to Soloist in 2006. Raine also has IMDb credits as an actress, due to the filming of the ballets Acis and Galatea, in 2009, and Alice's Adventures in Wonderland, in 2011, in which she performed leading roles. She retired as a dancer in 2012, after a fifteen-year career, and having already been appointed as the Ballet Mistress.

=== Ballet mistress ===
Raine is the ballet mistress of the Royal Ballet, having been appointed in 2012, at the young age of 32. With the assistant ballet mistress, Sian Murphy, she is responsible for ensuring the Company's corps de ballet knows the repertoire to perfection. Benesh notation is used to help teach the choreography.

In an interview, Raine gave an insight into the work required for one of the most challenging sequences: the "Kingdom of the Shades", in Act III of La Bayadère.
