= Anna Whelan Betts =

American illustrator and art teacher

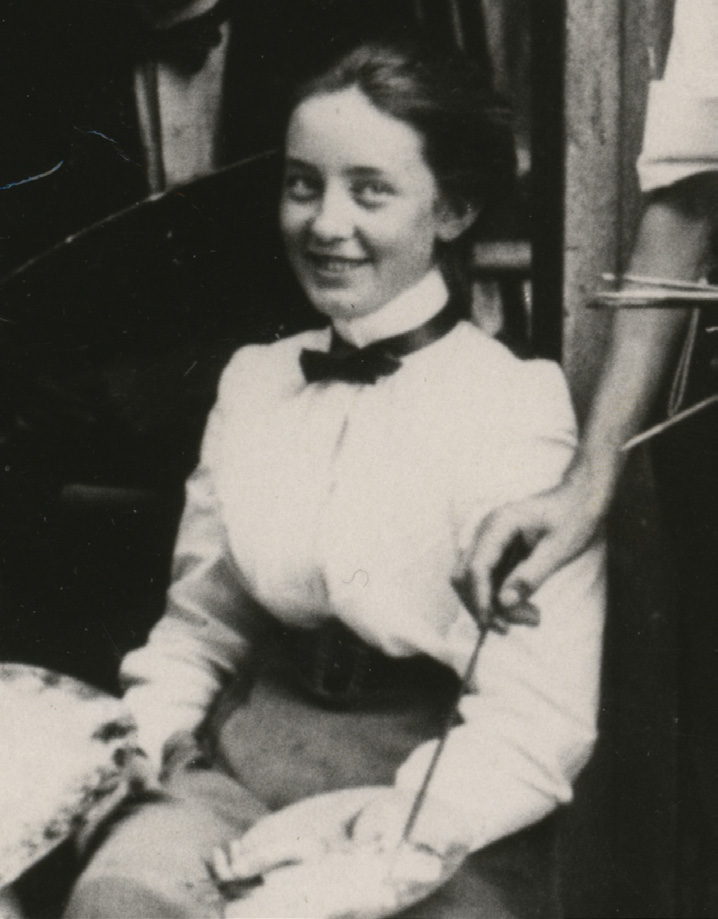
- Betts in 1899
- Born: May 15, 1873; Philadelphia, Pennsylvania, U.S.
- Died: February 6, 1959 (aged 85); Philadelphia, Pennsylvania, U.S.
- Education: Pennsylvania Academy; Drexel Institute
- Known for: Illustration

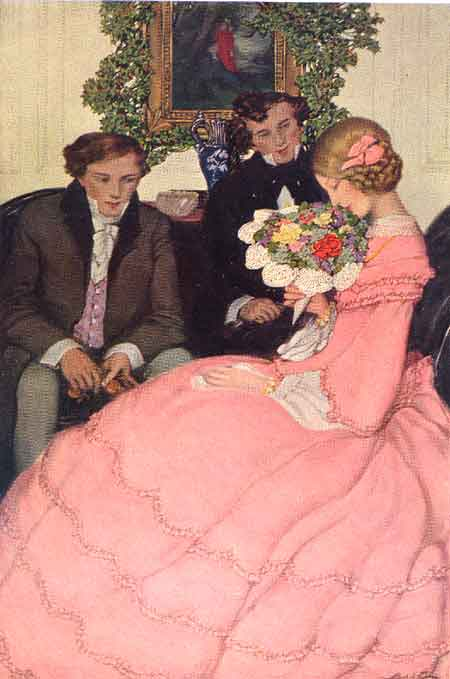
Christmas Callers, an illustration by Betts that appeared in the December 1904 edition of The Century Magazine

Anna Whelan Betts (May 15, 1873 – February 6, 1959) was an American illustrator and art teacher who was noted for her paintings of Victorian women in romantic settings. Betts is considered one of the primary artists of the golden age of American illustration during the late 19th and early 20th centuries. Art historian Walt Reed described Betts's work as "characterized by its great beauty and sensitivity."

== Early life and education ==
Betts was born on May 15, 1873, in Philadelphia, Pennsylvania, the oldest of three children of the physician Thomas Betts and Alice Whelan. Her sister, Ethel Franklin Betts, also became an artist. Betts studied art at the Pennsylvania Academy in Philadelphia with Robert Vonnoh. After graduating, she moved to Paris where she was tutored by the French painter Gustave-Claude-Etienne Courtois.

== Career ==
Upon returning to the United States, she studied illustration under Howard Pyle, a professor of illustration art at Drexel Institute, now Drexel University, in Philadelphia. He later founded the Howard Pyle School of Art in Wilmington, Delaware. Betts's first published illustration was for Collier's magazine in 1899. Her work later appeared in many of the popular magazines of the early 1900s including Century Magazine, Harper's, The Ladies’ Home Journal, and St. Nicholas Magazine. Her earliest book illustrations appeared while she was still a Howard Pyle student. For example, Betts illustrated Sarah Orne Jewett's 1899 publication of Betty Leicester’s Christmas published by Houghton Mifflin Company. And in 1900 she was one of the community of illustrators chosen to provide illustrations for The Complete Writings of Nathaniel Hawthorne in 22 volumes by Houghton, Mifflin Company. Betts created the illustrations for volume 1. Betts was honored as a fellow at the Pennsylvania Academy and won several medals, including a bronze medal at the Panama-Pacific International Exposition (1915) in San Francisco.

After her eyesight began failing in 1925, Betts was advised to retire from illustration. She joined the faculty of the small private boys' school, Solebury School, where she worked as an administrator, hostess and art teacher.

In 1944, Betts retired from teaching and moved to New Hope, Pennsylvania, to live with her sister Ethel.

== Death ==
On February 6, 1959, Betts died at their home in Philadelphia.
