= Holly Webb =

British children's writer (born 1976)

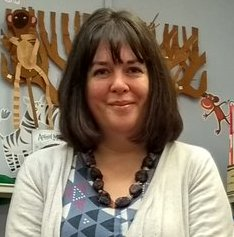
- Webb at Pangbourne Library
- Born: February 4, 1976 (age 50); London, England
- Education: Newnham College, Cambridge
- Writing career
- Genre: children's literature
- Website: holly-webb.com

Holly Webb (born 1976 in London) is a British children's writer. She studied Classics at Newnham College at Cambridge University, Byzantine and Medieval Art History at the Courtauld Institute of Art, and then worked as a children's book editor until 2005. She lives outside Reading with her husband Jon and her three children, Aisling, Robin and William.

Her works have been translated into 31 different languages, including Russian and Polish. Her books are published by Scholastic, Stripes, Orchard and Nosy Crow.

According to Russia Beyond the Headlines, she was one of the 10 most popular children's writers in Russia in 2016. 97 books by her with a total print run of 595,000 copies were published there that year.

In Kazakhstan, her book Maisie Hitchins and the Case of the Phantom Cat was the fifth best-selling book for teenagers of 2017.

She is also very popular in Poland. It was estimated that her Animal Stories series, targeted at girls aged 6–10, sold over 500,000 copies in that country up to February 2013.

== Ongoing ==
=== Animal Stories ===
| # | Title | First published |
|---|---|---|
| 1 | Lost in the Snow | 2006 |
| 2 | Alfie All Alone | 2006 |
| 3 | Lost in the Storm | 2007 |
| 4 | Sam the Stolen Puppy | 2008 |
| 5 | Max the Missing Puppy | 2008 |
| 6 | Sky the Unwanted Kitten | 2008 |
| 7 | Timmy in Trouble | 2008 |
| 8 | Ginger the Stray Kitten | 2009 |
| 9 | Harry the Homeless Puppy | 2009 |
| 10 | Buttons the Runaway Puppy | 2009 |
| 11 | Alone in the Night | 2009 |
| 12 | Ellie the Homesick Puppy | 2010 |
| 13 | Jess the Lonely Puppy | 2010 |
| 14 | Misty the Abandoned Kitten | 2010 |
| 15 | Oscar's Lonely Christmas | 2010 |
| 16 | Lucy the Poorly Puppy | 2011 |
| 17 | Smudge the Stolen Kitten | 2011 |
| 18 | The Rescued Puppy | 2011 |
| 19 | The Kitten Nobody Wanted | 2011 |
| 20 | The Lost Puppy | 2012 |
| 21 | The Frightened Kitten | 2012 |
| 22 | The Secret Puppy | 2012 |
| 23 | The Abandoned Puppy | 2013 |
| 24 | The Missing Kitten | 2013 |
| 25 | The Puppy Who Was Left Behind | 2013 |
| 26 | The Kidnapped Kitten | 2014 |
| 27 | The Scruffy Puppy | 2014 |
| 28 | The Brave Kitten | 2014 |
| 29 | The Forgotten Puppy | 2015 |
| 30 | The Secret Kitten | 2015 |
| 31 | A Home for Molly | 2015 |
| 32 | Sammy the Shy Kitten | 2016 |
| 33 | The Seaside Puppy | 2016 |
| 34 | The Curious Kitten | 2016 |
| 35 | Monty the Sad Puppy | 2017 |
| 36 | The Homeless Kitten | 2017 |
| 37 | A Kitten Called Tiger | 2017 |
| 38 | The Unwanted Puppy | 2018 |
| 39 | The Rescued Kitten | 2018 |
| 40 | The Shelter Puppy | 2018 |
| 41 | The Perfect Kitten | 2019 |
| 42 | The Puppy Who Couldn't Sleep | 2019 |
| 43 | The Loneliest Kitten | 2019 |
| 44 | The Mystery Kitten | 2020 |
| 45 | The Story Puppy | 2020 |
| 46 | The Saddest Kitten | 2020 |
| 47 | The Kitten Next Door | 2021 |
| 48 | The Puppy Who Ran Away | 2021 |
| 49 | Nadia and the Forever Kitten | 2021 |
| 50 | A Puppy's First Christmas | 2021 |
| 51 | The Homesick Kitten | 2022 |
| 52 | The Frightened Puppy | 2022 |
| 53 | The Smallest Kitten | 2022 |
| 54 | The Borrowed Puppy | 2023 |
| 55 | The Railway Kitten | 2023 |
| 56 | The Trapped Puppy | 2023 |
| 57 | The Firefighter's Kitten | 2024 |
| 58 | The Hero Puppy | 2024 |
| 59 | The Determined Kitten | 2024 |
| 60 | The Bold Kitten | 2025 |
| 61 | The Summer Puppy | 2025 |
| 62 | The Proud Puppy | 2026 |
| 63 | A Friend at Christmas | 2026 |

=== Winter Wildlife Stories ===
| # | Title | First published |
|---|---|---|
| 1 | The Snow Bear | 2012 |
| 2 | The Reindeer Girl | 2013 |
| 3 | The Winter Wolf | 2014 |
| 4 | The Storm Leopards | 2015 |
| 5 | The Snow Cat | 2016 |
| 6 | The Storm Dog | 2017 |
| 7 | Frost | 2018 |
| 8 | Star | 2019 |
| 9 | Luna | 2020 |
| 10 | Sky | 2021 |
| 11 | The Arctic Fox | 2024 |
| 12 | The Snowy Penguin | 2025 |
| 13 | The Secret Pine Marten | 2026 |

=== Summer Wildlife Stories ===
| # | Title | First published |
|---|---|---|
| 1 | The Hideaway Deer | 2019 |
| 2 | The Silver Pony | 2020 |
| 3 | The Wildmeadow Hare | 2021 |
| 4 | The Dawn Seal | 2022 |
| 5 | The Lost Bear Cub | 2023 |
| 6 | The Summer Dolphin | 2024 |
| 7 | The Woodland Badger | 2025 |
| 8 | The Littlest Puffling | 2026 |

=== A Rose Patrol Mystery ===
| # | Title | First published |
|---|---|---|
| 1 | A Girl's Guide to Spying | 2026 |

=== Standalone Books ===
| # | Title | First published |
|---|---|---|
| 1 | A Cat Called Penguin | 2011 |
| 2 | The Chocolate Dog | 2012 |
| 3 | Looking for Bear | 2013 |
| 4 | A Tiger Tale | 2014 |
| 5 | The Truffle Mouse | 2015 |
| 6 | The Midnight Panda | 2016 |
| 7 | The Pocket Dog | 2016 |
| 8 | The Princess and the Suffragette | 2017 |
| 9 | Evie's War | 2018 |
| 10 | Return to the Secret Garden | 2019 |
| 11 | The Runaways | 2019 |

== Complete ==
=== Triplets ===
| # | Title | First published |
|---|---|---|
| 1 | Becky's Terrible Term | 2004 |
| 2 | Annabel's Perfect Party | 2004 |
| 3 | Katie's Big Match | 2004 |
| 4 | Becky's Problem Pet | 2004 |
| 5 | Annabel's Starring Role | 2004 |
| 6 | Katie's Secret Admirer | 2005 |
| 7 | Becky's Dress Disaster | 2005 |

=== Animal Magic ===
| # | Title | First published |
|---|---|---|
| 1 | Catmagic | 2008 |
| 2 | Dogmagic | 2008 |
| 3 | Hamstermagic | 2008 |
| 4 | Rabbitmagic | 2008 |
| 5 | Birdmagic | 2010 |
| 6 | Ponymagic | 2010 |
| 7 | Mousemagic | 2011 |

=== Magic Molly ===
| # | Title | First published |
|---|---|---|
| 1 | The Witch's Kitten | 2009 |
| 2 | The Wish Puppy | 2009 |
| 3 | The Invisible Bunny | 2009 |
| 4 | The Secret Pony | 2009 |
| 5 | The Shy Piglet | 2011 |
| 6 | The Good Luck Duck | 2012 |
| 7 | The Clever Little Kitten | 2012 |

- The Purple Butterfly (early reader) - 2014

=== Rose ===
| # | Title | First published |
|---|---|---|
| 1 | Rose | 2009 |
| 2 | Rose and the Lost Princess | 2010 |
| 3 | Rose and the Magician's Mask | 2010 |
| 4 | Rose and the Silver Ghost | 2011 |

=== My Naughty Little Puppy ===
| # | Title | First published |
|---|---|---|
| 1 | A Home for Rascal | 2010 |
| 2 | New Tricks for Rascal | 2010 |
| 3 | Playtime for Rascal | 2010 |
| 4 | Rascal's Sleepover Fun | 2010 |
| 5 | Rascal's Seaside Adventure | 2011 |
| 6 | Rascal's Festive Fun | 2011 |
| 7 | Rascal and the Wedding | 2012 |
| 8 | Rascal the Star | 2012 |

=== Lily ===
| # | Title | First published |
|---|---|---|
| 1 | Lily | 2011 |
| 2 | Lily and the Shining Dragons | 2012 |
| 3 | Lily and the Prisoner of Magic | 2012 |
| 4 | Lily and the Traitors' Spell | 2013 |

=== Maisie Hitchins ===
| # | Title | First published |
|---|---|---|
| 1 | The Case of the Stolen Sixpence | 2013 |
| 2 | The Case of the Vanishing Emerald | 2013 |
| 3 | The Case of the Phantom Cat | 2013 |
| 4 | The Case of the Feathered Mask | 2014 |
| 5 | The Case of the Secret Tunnel | 2014 |
| 6 | The Case of the Spilled Ink | 2014 |
| 7 | The Case of the Blind Beetle | 2015 |
| 8 | The Case of the Weeping Mermaid | 2015 |

=== Emily Feather ===
| # | Title | First published |
|---|---|---|
| 1 | Emily Feather and the Enchanted Door | 2013 |
| 2 | Emily Feather and the Secret Mirror | 2013 |
| 3 | Emily Feather and the Chest of Charms | 2014 |
| 4 | Emily Feather and the Starlit Staircase | 2014 |

=== Earth Friends ===
The series was originally published in 2014 under no apparent title. In 2021, it was rebranded under the title Earth Friends and all the books were consequently renamed. Original titles on the left.

| # | Title | First published |
|---|---|---|
| 1 | Maya's Secret/Fair Fashion | 2014 |
| 2 | Izzy's River/River Rescue | 2014 |
| 3 | Poppy's Garden/Green Garden | 2014 |
| 4 | Emily's Dream/Pet Protection | 2015 |

=== A Magical Venice Story ===
| # | Title | First published |
|---|---|---|
| 1 | The Water Horse | 2015 |
| 2 | The Mermaid's Sister | 2016 |
| 3 | The Maskmaker's Daughter | 2016 |
| 4 | The Girl of Glass | 2017 |

=== Furry Friends ===
| # | Title | First published |
|---|---|---|
| 1 | Sophie's Squeaky Surprise | 2016 |
| 2 | Marshmallow Magic | 2017 |
| 3 | Peril in Paris | 2017 |

=== The Hounds of Penhallow Hall ===
| # | Title | First published |
|---|---|---|
| 1 | The Moonlight Statue | 2017 |
| 2 | The Lost Treasure | 2017 |
| 3 | The Hidden Staircase | 2018 |
| 4 | The Secrets Tree | 2018 |

=== Shine ===
| # | Title | First published |
|---|---|---|
| 1 | Chloe Centre Stage | 2018 |
| 2 | Sara's Dream Role | 2019 |
| 3 | Lily's Secret Audition | 2019 |
| 4 | Bethany Sings Out | 2020 |

=== Museum Kittens ===
| # | Title | First published |
|---|---|---|
| 1 | The Midnight Visitor | 2020 |
| 2 | The Pharaoh's Curse | 2020 |
| 3 | The Sleepover Mystery | 2021 |
| 4 | The Treasure Map | 2021 |

=== Little Gems ===
Little Gems is a collaborative series by many authors and illustrators. There are more than 80 books.

| # | Title | First published |
|---|---|---|
| 1 | The Beach Puppy | 2021 |
| 2 | The Little Lost Kitten | 2023 |
| 3 | The Missing Bunny | 2024 |
| 4 | The Guinea Pig Party | 2025 |
| 5 | The Runaway Tortoise | 2026 |

=== The Story of Greenriver ===
| # | Title | First published |
|---|---|---|
| 1 | The Story of Greenriver | 2022 |
| 2 | The Swan's Warning | 2023 |

=== Picture Books ===
| # | Title | First published |
|---|---|---|
| 1 | Little Puppy Lost | 2014 |
| 2 | The Snow Princess | 2015 |
| 3 | The Snow Princess and the Winter Rescue | 2016 |
