= Robert Sickinger =

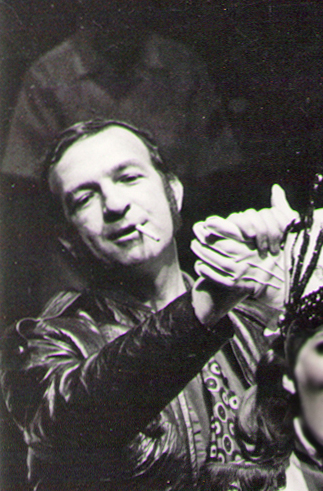
Robert "Bob" Sickinger directing an actor in "Desert Song" how to dance with a partner. Photographed during a dress rehearsal at the Hull House Theater in Chicago

William Robert Sickinger (November 7, 1926 – May 9, 2013) was an American theater director, based in Chicago. He was regarded as the founder of "off-Loop" theater, the Chicago equivalent of Off-Broadway. He often cast non-professional actors in his productions, and in doing so occasionally found new talent such as David Mamet, Marilu Henner, Jim Jacobs, and Mike Nussbaum, all of whom were Sickinger proteges.

== Early life ==
Raised in Philadelphia, Sickinger was drafted into the United States Army while still at school and served in the Philippines during the Second World War. He subsequently resumed his studies at Bloomsburg University of Pennsylvania, where he trained as a teacher and first discovered theater.

== Chicago theater ==
Sickinger was able to convince a local movie theater owner to rent him space, and produced a number of plays in this venue during the early 1950s. He was later hired by Hull House Association director Paul Jans to run a theater programme in Chicago. Sickinger chose to produce "challenging, sometimes distressing contemporary plays" on subjects that had never been seen on Chicago stages, mounting productions by Edward Albee, Harold Pinter, Athol Fugard, and Amiri Baraka. Though his choices raised eyebrows, critics generally praised his productions as "revelatory".

Sickinger founded the Uptown Theater, as well as other theaters in more deprived areas of Chicago. He was an accomplished fundraiser, promoting theater in unlikely venues such as breakfast clubs and organising performances in the homes of Chicago's wealthier citizens. He attended almost every performance of his productions, and would continue giving notes to the actors throughout a show's run.

== Later career ==
After Jans' resignation in 1969, Sickinger was also obliged to resign from the Hull House Association when board members argued that he was no longer engaged with their mission to provide social services. Sickinger relocated to New York, where he directed a number of off-Broadway shows with limited success. He later retired from theater and began running a telemarketing company called Everything For Living Space.

He died of congestive heart failure at his residence in Delray Beach, Florida, on May 9, 2013, aged 86.
