= Jesse Olney =

American politician

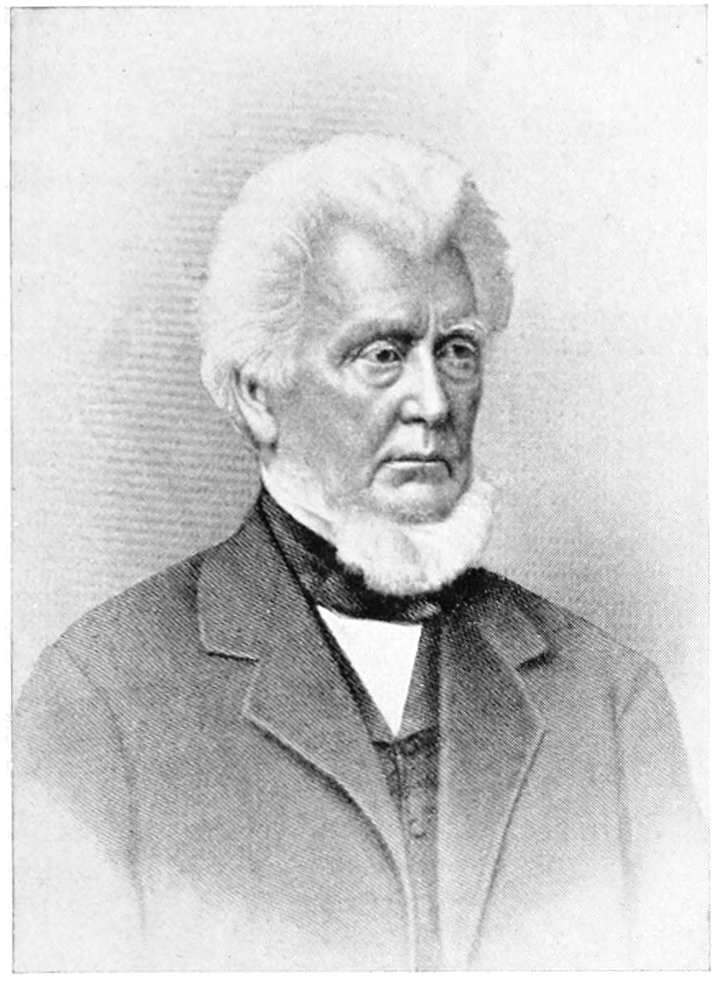
- Portrait of Jesse Olney from the Connecticut Magazine
- Born: 12 October 1798; Union, Connecticut, United States
- Died: July 31, 1872 (aged 73); Stratford, Connecticut, United States
- Known for: Publishing A Geography and Atlas

Jesse Olney (12 October 1798 – 31 July 1872) was an American geographer. He was active in the improvement of school textbooks on the subject of geography. His work was rewarded with substantial sales, second only to Noah Webster's American Spelling Book.

== Early life ==
Olney was born on 12 October 1798 in Union, Connecticut. He was educated at Whitesboro, New York, became a teacher at Whitesborough and Binghamton, and was for twelve years principal of the Stone School in Hartford, Connecticut, resigning in 1831.

== Career ==
In 1828, he brought out A Geography and Atlas, which was at once accepted as a standard work, and for thirty years was used in almost every public and private school of the United States. It was many times enlarged and revised, and ran through 98 editions, some of the editions numbering 80,000 copies. Millions of copies were sold, and the popularity of Olney's Geography was surpassed only by that of Webster's American Spelling Book.

Olney's Geography has the distinction of having caused a complete revolution in the methods of teaching geography. Olney was a practical instructor, and was dissatisfied with the existing textbooks and treatises, which began with an exposition of the science of astronomy, and, making the centre of the Solar System the initial point, developed the scheme until it finally included the Earth. Olney reversed this method. He began with the scholar's own continent — in fact, in the very city, town, or village in which he or she lived, and made clear by lucid definitions the natural divisions of land and water, illustrating each instance by the use of maps. His plan was to familiarize the child with the surface of the Earth by going from the near to the distant, and from the concrete to the abstract, and this system at once overthrew theoretic geography, and initiated the modern practical and descriptive science.

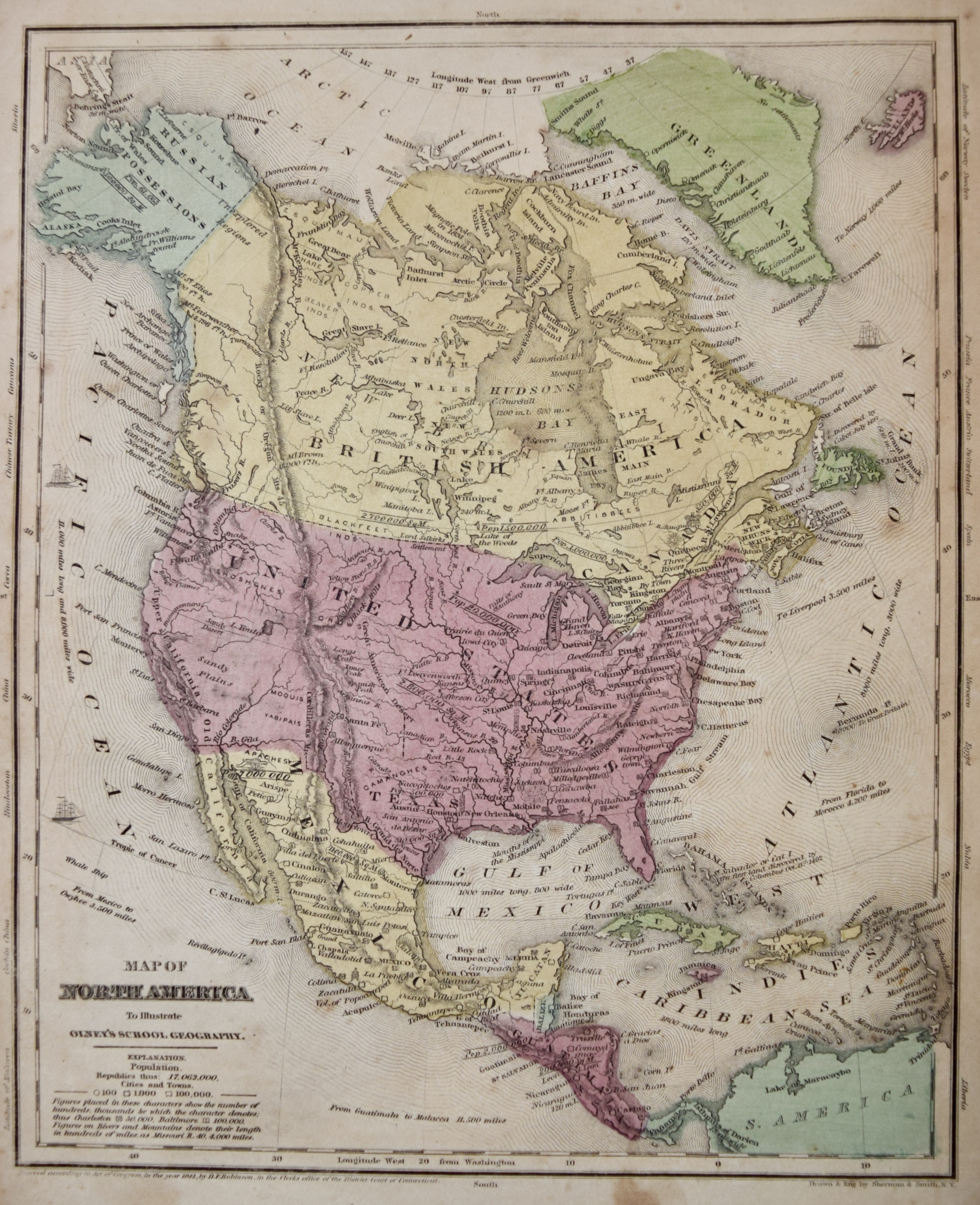
1844 school map

== Later life and death ==
The immediate success of the work led Olney to give up teaching and devote himself to authorship. Leaving Hartford in 1833, he settled in Southington, Connecticut, until 1854, when he moved to Stratford. His text-books (1831–52) included other geographies, a series of readers, a Common School Arithmetic, and a History of the United States. He also compiled A Family Book of History, Psalms of Life, poems, and other works.

After discontinuing to teach, he devoted himself to the cause of popular education. He was for many years a member of the legislature, afterward comptroller of the state for two terms, and used largely his legislative and official powers to build up the system of Connecticut common schools. In 1840, he had become a Unitarian, and for the next fourteen years he gave sympathy and much practical aid to the liberal religious movement that was then agitating New England. He died on 31 July 1872 in Stratford.
