= Lucile Patterson Marsh =

American illustrator (1890–1978)

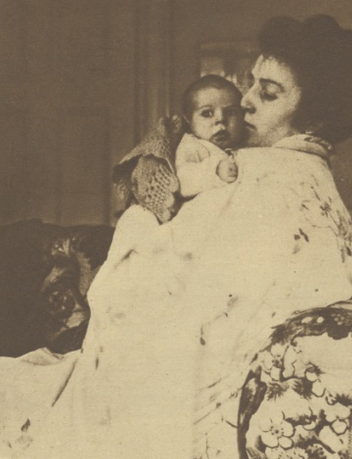
- Born: October 21, 1890; Rapid City, South Dakota
- Died: July 1978 (aged 87); New York City
- Education: Art
- Alma mater: The School of the Art Institute of Chicago and Archipenko School of Sculpture
- Known for: Illustrating magazine covers and advertisements
- Style: Oil painting, Watercolor painting, Illustration

Lucile Patterson Marsh, also spelled as Lucille Patterson Marsh, (October 21, 1890 – July 1978) was a prominent illustrator during the 1920s to 1950s. She illustrated numerous covers for magazines including, Woman's Home Companion and Cosmopolitan. Marsh also illustrated advertisements for Jell-O, Pet Milk, and Ivory soap, among others.

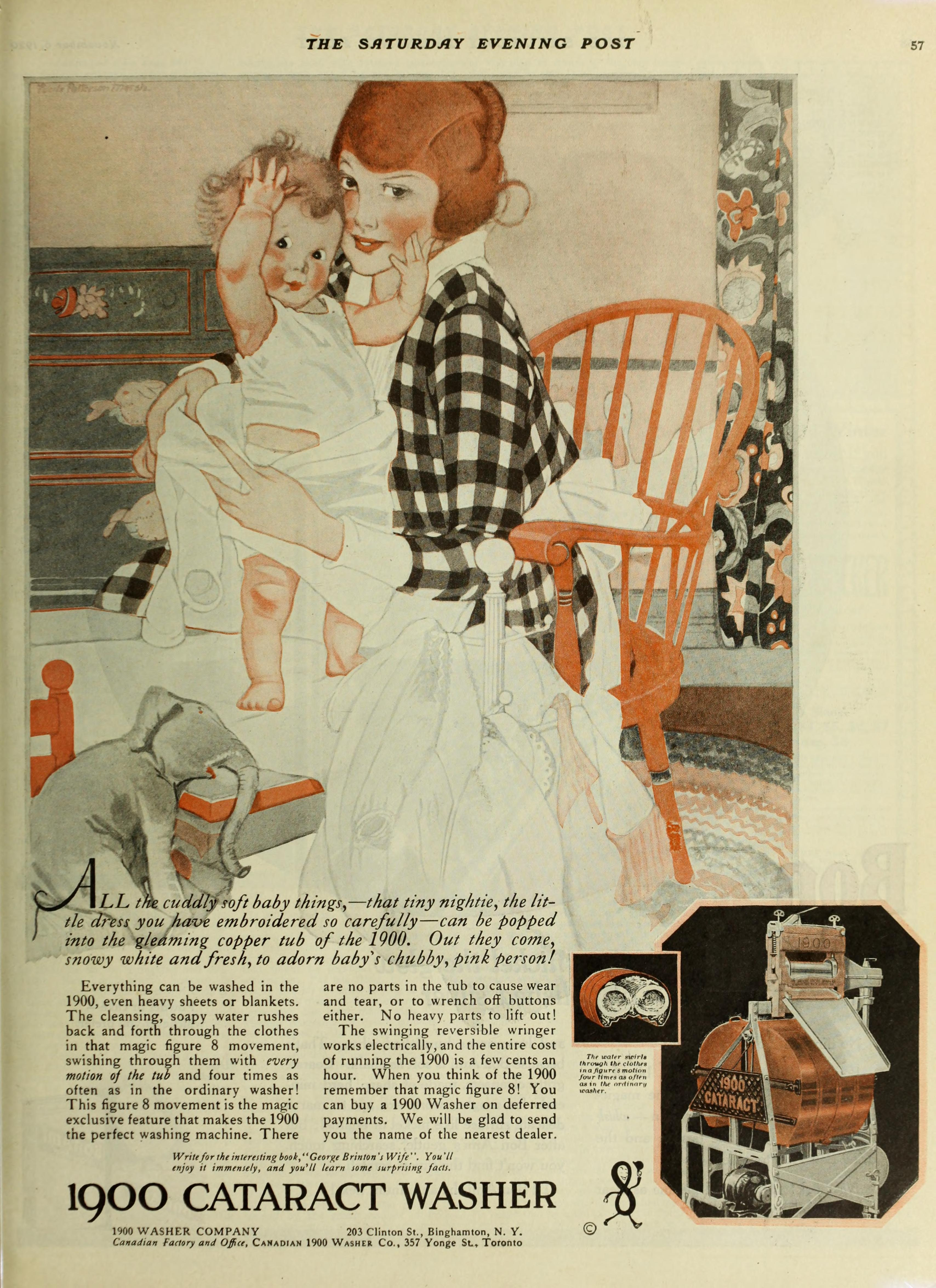
Lucile Patterson Marsh. Saturday Evening Post illustration, 1920.

== Biography ==
Marsh was born October 21, 1890, in Rapid City, South Dakota. She studied at The School of the Art Institute of Chicago, and later at the Archipenko School of Sculpture. In 1913, she was awarded the American Traveling Scholarship from the Art Institute of Chicago.

Marsh's illustrations usually featured children, many times in a "homey" setting. Her illustrations were featured in national magazines, among them: The Saturday Evening Post, Gates School Reader, Ladies' Home Journal, Babytalk, Woman's Home Companion, Pictorial Review, and Cosmopolitan.

Also an illustrator for advertisements, Marsh's work appeared on ad accounts for Ivory soap, Jell-O, Pet Milk, Cataract Washer, and General Electric.

In 1917, Marsh hand-painted a billboard overlooking Fifth Avenue and 42nd Street in New York City. During this year, Marsh also designed a World War I poster titled, "Service, Fall In!" The poster was created for the National League for Women's Service. It aimed to encourage women to do their part in the home front war effort, while continuing to keep their household duties.

In the early 1900s, she was commissioned to illustrate an advertisement for the National Board of the YWCA. The title of the poster was "The Play's the Thing," and its message was camaraderie and sisterhood.

Marsh taught at the Art Students League of New York. She was a member of the Artists Guild of New York City and the Society of Illustrators. During her career, Marsh resided in New York City. She died in July 1978 in New York City.
