= Dante Gabriel Rossetti =

English poet and artist (1828–1882)

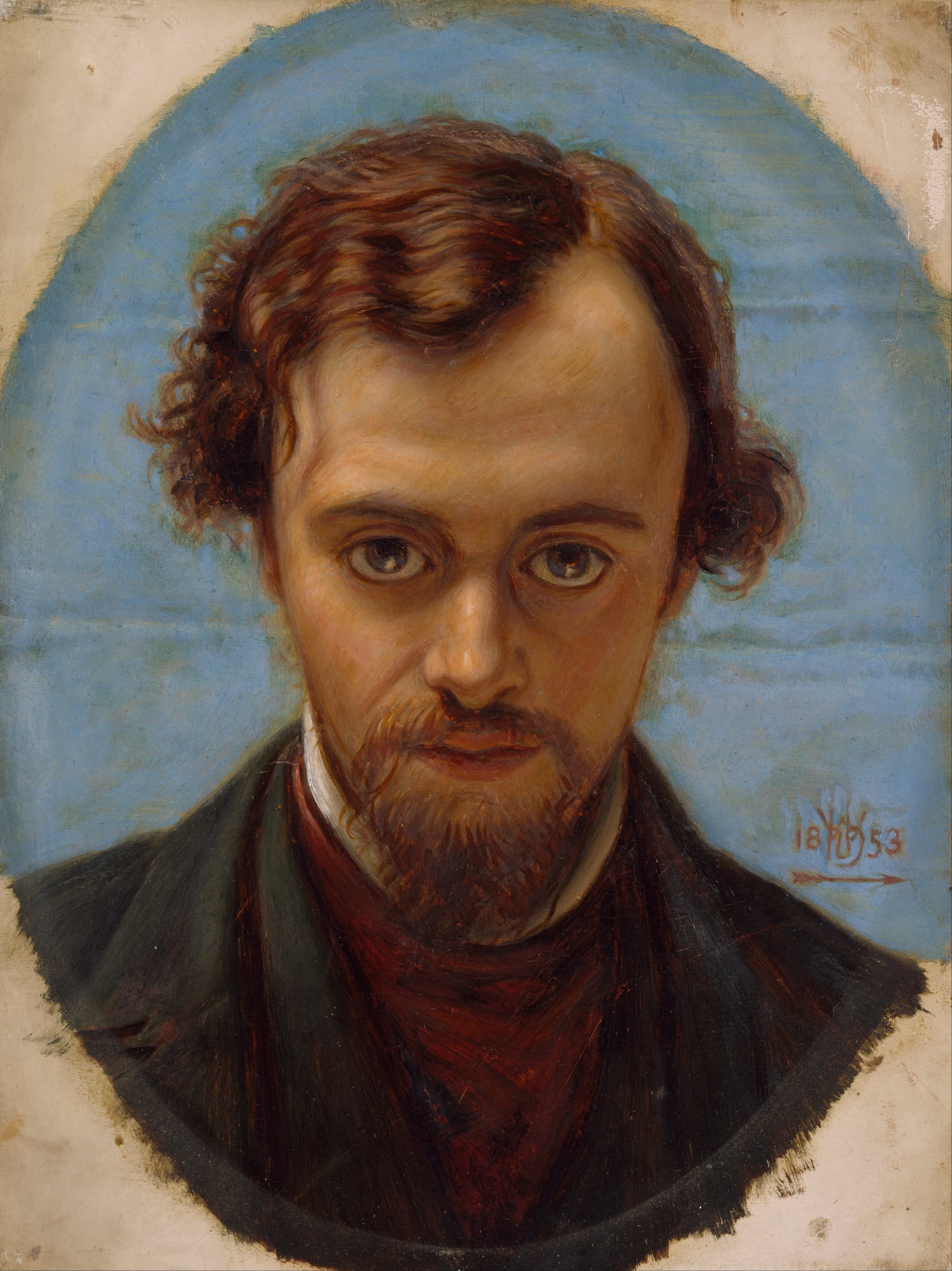
- Portrait by William Holman Hunt, 1853
- Born: Gabriel Charles Dante Rossetti; 12 May 1828; London, England
- Died: 9 April 1882 (aged 53); Birchington-on-Sea, England
- Education: King's College School; Royal Academy
- Occupations: Poet, illustrator, painter
- Spouse: Elizabeth Siddal (m. 1860; died 1862)
- Parents: Gabriele Rossetti; Frances Polidori
- Relatives: Christina Georgina Rossetti (sister); Maria Francesca Rossetti (sister); William Michael Rossetti (brother); Gaetano Polidori (maternal grandfather); John William Polidori (maternal uncle)

Gabriel Charles Dante Rossetti (12 May 1828 – 9 April 1882), generally known as Dante Gabriel Rossetti (/rəˈzɛti/ rə-ZET-ee; Italian: [rosˈsetti]), was an English poet, illustrator, painter and translator. He founded the Pre-Raphaelite Brotherhood in 1848 with William Holman Hunt and John Everett Millais. Rossetti inspired many contemporary artists and writers, such as Algernon Charles Swinburne, William Morris, and Edward Burne-Jones. His later work also influenced the European Symbolists and was a major precursor of the Aesthetic movement.

Rossetti's art was characterised by its sensuality and its mediaeval revivalism. His early poetry was influenced by John Keats and William Blake. He frequently wrote sonnets to accompany his pictures, spanning from The Girlhood of Mary Virgin (1849) to Astarte Syriaca (1877), while also creating art to illustrate poems such as Goblin Market by his sister Christina Rossetti.

From about 1860, Rossetti's painting style changed to a dense, rich style drawing from later Italian Renaissance painting, very often showing a single female figure using one of his small group of regular models, typically with a luxuriant background of vegetation. He also produced many drawings, prints, and book illustrations.

Rossetti's personal life was closely linked to his work, especially his relationships with his models and muses, including Elizabeth Siddal (whom he married), Fanny Cornforth, and Jane Morris.

== Early life ==
Self-portrait, 1847

Gabriel Charles Dante Rossetti was born on 12 May 1828, at 38 Charlotte Street (later renamed 105 Hallam Street) in London. His father was the émigré Italian scholar Gabriele Pasquale Giuseppe Rossetti, and his mother was Frances Mary Lavinia Polidori, the daughter of an Italian scholar from Tuscany, Gaetano Polidori. The writer and physician John William Polidori was Rossetti's maternal uncle.

Rossetti’s family and friends called him Gabriel, but in publications he favoured the name Dante. He had three siblings: the poet Christina Rossetti, the critic William Michael Rossetti, and the author Maria Francesca Rossetti. His father was a lapsed Roman Catholic and his mother was an Anglican: Gabriel was baptised as Anglican.

The household was a bohemian environment, with frequent visits by Italian artists, scholars, adventurers and revolutionaries, and the children, including Gabriel, were educated together at home by their mother, who was an important influence on all of them and taught them the works of Dante and Petrarch.

Rossetti went on to attend King's College School in its original location near the Strand in London. He read the Bible, along with the works of Shakespeare, Dickens, Sir Walter Scott, and Lord Byron. In his teens he discovered the work of Dante Aligheri, whose Vita Nuova he later translated.

The youthful Rossetti is described as "self-possessed, articulate, passionate and charismatic" but also "ardent, poetic and feckless". Like all his siblings, he aspired to be a poet. He also wished to be a painter, having shown a great interest in Medieval Italian art. He studied at Henry Sass' Drawing Academy from 1841 to 1845, when he enrolled in the Antique School of the Royal Academy, which he left in 1848. After leaving the Royal Academy, Rossetti studied under Ford Madox Brown, with whom he retained a close relationship throughout his life.

Following the exhibition of William Holman Hunt's painting The Eve of St. Agnes, Rossetti sought out Hunt's friendship. The painting illustrated a poem by John Keats. Rossetti's own poem, "The Blessed Damozel", was an imitation of Keats, and he believed Hunt might share his artistic and literary ideals. Together they developed the philosophy of the Pre-Raphaelite Brotherhood, a group they founded along with John Everett Millais.

The group's intention was to reform English art by rejecting what they considered to be the mechanistic approach first adopted by the Mannerist artists who succeeded Raphael and Michelangelo and the formal training regime introduced by Sir Joshua Reynolds. Their approach was to return to the abundant detail, intense colours, and complex compositions of Quattrocento Italian and Flemish art. Their technique involved the use of pure colours on a white background, and they also often painted outdoors for maximum authenticity.

The critic John Ruskin wrote:

Every Pre-Raphaelite landscape background is painted to the last touch, in the open air, from the thing itself. Every Pre-Raphaelite figure, however studied in expression, is a true portrait of some living person.

For the first issue of the brotherhood's magazine, The Germ, published early in 1850, Rossetti contributed his poem, "The Blessed Damozel", and a story about a fictional early Italian artist inspired by a vision of a woman who bids him combine the human and the divine in his art.

== Career ==
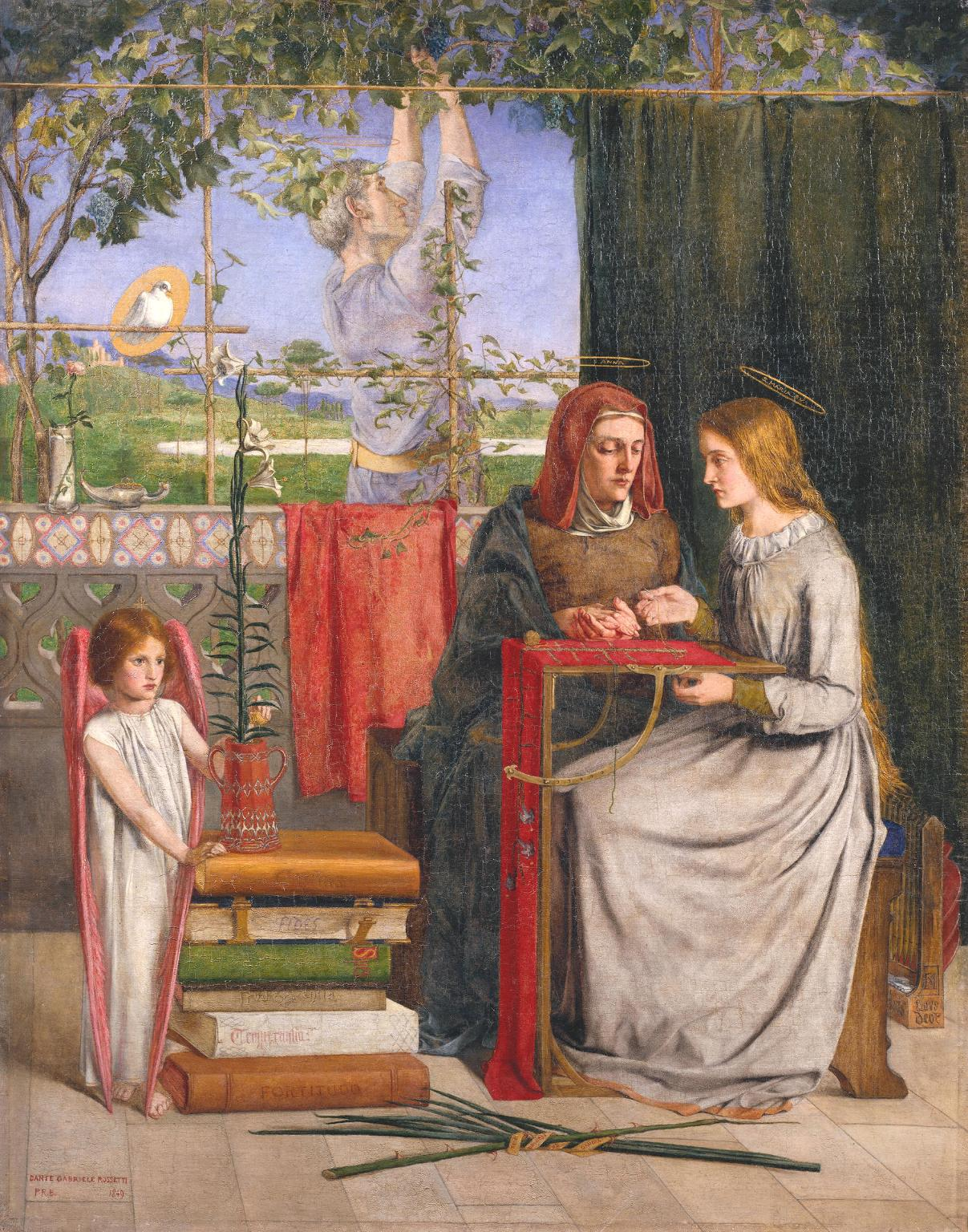
The Girlhood of Mary Virgin (1849). The models were the artist's mother for Saint Anne and his sister Christina for the Virgin.

=== Beginnings ===
Rossetti's first major oil paintings display the realist qualities of the early Pre-Raphaelite movement. His Girlhood of Mary Virgin (1849) and Ecce Ancilla Domini! (1850) portray Mary as a teenage girl. William Bell Scott saw Girlhood in progress in Hunt's studio and remarked on young Rossetti's technique:

He was painting in oils with water-colour brushes, as thinly as in water-colour, on canvas which he had primed with white till the surface was a smooth as cardboard, and every tint remained transparent. I saw at once that he was not an orthodox boy, but acting purely from the aesthetic motive. The mixture of genius and dilettantism of both men [Rossetti and Hunt] shut me up for the moment, and whetted my curiosity.

Stung by criticism of his second major painting, Ecce Ancilla Domini, exhibited in 1850, and the "increasingly hysterical critical reaction that greeted Pre-Raphaelitism" that year, Rossetti turned to watercolours, which could be sold privately. Although his work subsequently won support from John Ruskin, Rossetti rarely exhibited thereafter.

=== Dante and Mediaevalism ===
For many years, Rossetti had worked on translations of Italian poetry, including Dante Alighieri's La Vita Nuova (published as The Early Italian Poets in 1861). These, along with Sir Thomas Malory's Le Morte d'Arthur, inspired his art of the 1850s. Rossetti created a method of painting in watercolours, using thick pigments mixed with gum to give rich effects similar to mediaeval illuminations. He also developed a novel drawing technique in pen-and-ink. His first published illustration was "The Maids of Elfen-Mere" (1855), for a poem by his friend William Allingham, and he contributed two illustrations to Edward Moxon's 1857 edition of Alfred, Lord Tennyson's Poems and illustrations for works by his sister Christina Rossetti.

His visions of Arthurian romance and mediaeval design also inspired William Morris and Edward Burne-Jones. Neither Burne-Jones nor Morris knew Rossetti, but they were much influenced by his works, and met him by recruiting him as a contributor to their Oxford and Cambridge Magazine, which Morris founded in 1856 to promote his ideas about art and poetry.

In February 1857, Rossetti wrote to William Bell Scott:

Two young men, projectors of the Oxford and Cambridge Magazine, have recently come up to town from Oxford, and are now very intimate friends of mine. Their names are Morris and Jones. They have turned artists instead of taking up any other career to which the university generally leads, and both are men of real genius. Jones's designs are marvels of finish and imaginative detail, unequalled by anything unless perhaps Albert Dürer's finest works.

That summer Morris and Rossetti visited Oxford and, finding the Oxford Union debating-hall under construction, pursued a commission to paint the upper walls with scenes from Le Morte d'Arthur and to decorate the roof between the open timbers. Seven artists were recruited, among them Valentine Prinsep and Arthur Hughes, and the work was hastily begun. The frescoes, done too soon and too fast, began to fade at once and now are barely decipherable. Rossetti recruited two sisters, Bessie and Jane Burden, as models for the Oxford Union murals, and Jane became Morris's wife in 1859.

Rossetti's incomplete picture Found, begun in 1853 and still unfinished at his death, was his only major modern-life subject. It depicted a prostitute, lifted from the street by a country drover who recognises his old sweetheart. However, Rossetti increasingly preferred symbolic and mythological images to realistic ones.

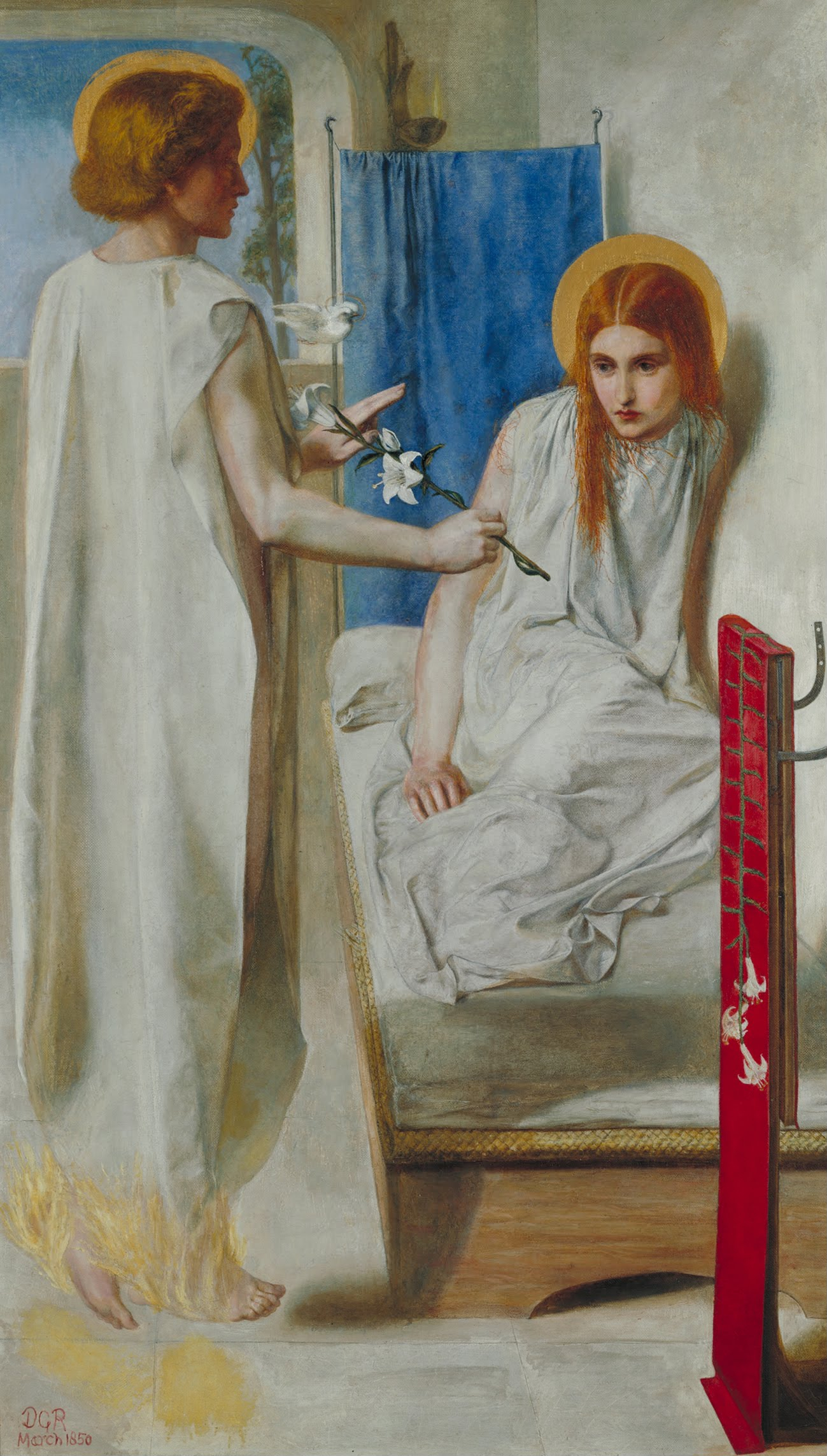
Ecce Ancilla Domini!, 1850, a depiction of the Annunciation

=== Book arts ===
Literature was integrated into the Pre-Raphaelite Brotherhood's artistic practice from the beginning, with many paintings making direct literary references. Rossetti was particularly critical of the gaudy ornamentation of Victorian gift books and sought to refine bindings and illustrations to align with the principles of the Aesthetic Movement. Rossetti's key bindings were designed between 1861 and 1871. He collaborated as a designer/illustrator with his sister, the poet Christina Rossetti, on the first edition of Goblin Market (1862) and The Prince's Progress (1866).

One of Rossetti's contributions to illustration was the collaborative book, Poems by Alfred, Lord Tennyson (published by Edward Moxon in 1857 and known colloquially as the 'Moxon Tennyson'). Moxon envisioned Royal Academicians as the illustrators, but this vision was quickly disrupted once Millais, a founding member of the Pre-Raphaelite Brotherhood, became involved. Millais recruited William Holman Hunt and Rossetti for the project, and the involvement of these artists reshaped the entire production of the book. In reference to the Pre-Raphaelite illustrations, Laurence Housman wrote "[...] The illustrations of the Pre-Raphaelites were personal and intellectual readings of the poems to which they belonged, not merely echoes in line of the words of the text." The Pre-Raphaelites' visualization of Tennyson's poems indicated the range of possibilities in interpreting written works, as did their unique approach to visualizing narrative on the canvas.

Pre-Raphaelite illustrations do not simply refer to the text in which they appear; rather, they are part of a bigger program of art: the book as a whole. Rossetti wrote in 1855 a letter to poet William Allingham, in reference to his work on the Moxon Tennyson:

I have not begun even designing for them yet, but fancy I shall try the Vision of Sin, and Palace of Art etc.—those where one can allegorize on one's own hook, without killing for oneself and everyone a distinct idea of the poet's.

=== Religious influence on works ===
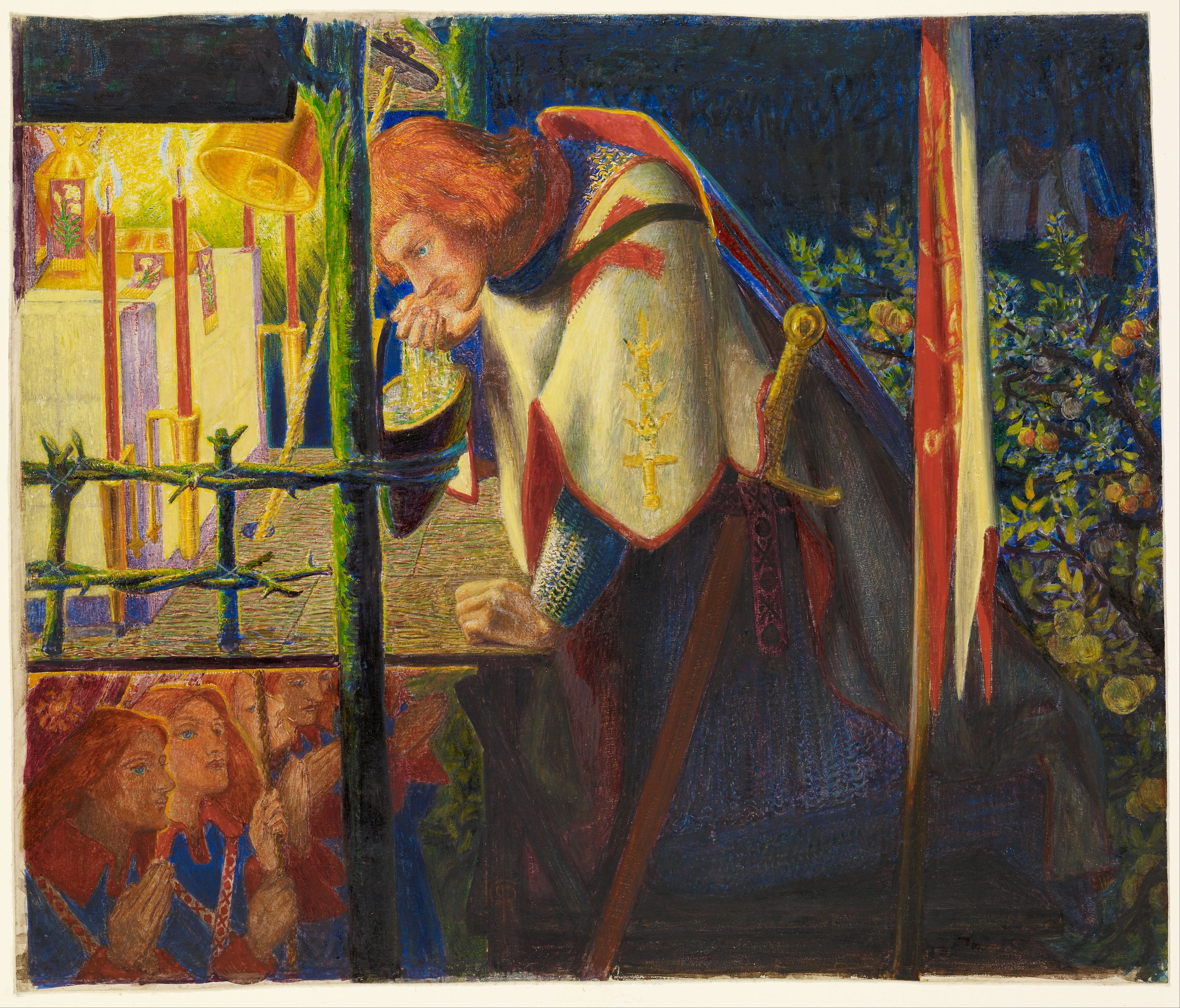
Sir Galahad at the ruined Chapel, watercolour and bodycolour, 1857–1859

England began to see a revival of religious beliefs and practices starting in 1833 and moving onward to about 1845. Rossetti and his family had been attending Christ Church, Albany Street since 1843. His brother, William Michael Rossetti, recorded that services had begun changing in the church since the start of the "High Anglican movement". Rev. William Dodsworth was responsible for these changes, including the addition of the Catholic practice of placing flowers and candles by the altar. Rossetti and his family, along with two of his colleagues (one of whom cofounded the Pre-Raphaelite Brotherhood), had also attended St. Andrew's on Wells Street, a High Anglican church.

William Michael Rossetti, his brother, wrote in 1895: "He was never confirmed, professed no religious faith, and practised no regular religious observances; but he had ... sufficient sympathy with the abstract ideas and the venerable forms of Christianity to go occasionally to an Anglican church – very occasionally, and only as the inclination ruled him."

In spite of his unorthodox approach to religion, Rossetti's early work often deals with religious themes and imagery. The oil painting The Girlhood of Mary Virgin, finished in 1849, features an altar decorated very similarly to that of a Catholic altar. The subject of the painting, the Blessed Virgin, is sewing a red cloth, a significant part of the Oxford Movement that emphasized the embroidering of altar cloths by women. Oxford Reformers identified two major aspects to their movement, that "the end of all religion must be communion with God," and "that the Church was divinely instituted for the very purpose of bringing about this consummation."

From the beginning of the Brotherhood's formation in 1848, their pieces of art included subjects of noble or religious disposition. Their aim was to communicate a message of "moral reform" through the style of their works, exhibiting a "truth to nature". In Rossetti's "Hand and Soul", written in 1849, he displays his main character Chiaro as an artist with spiritual inclinations. In the text, Chiaro's spirit appears before him in the form of a woman who instructs him to "set thine hand and thy soul to serve man with God." The Rossetti Archive defines this text as "Rossetti's way of constellating his commitments to art, religious devotion, and a thoroughly secular historicism." Likewise, in "The Blessed Damozel", written between 1847 and 1870, Rossetti describes the Damozel looking down "From the gold bar of Heaven" to Earth. In "Ave" (1847), Mary awaits the day that she will meet her son in Heaven, uniting the earthly with the heavenly. The text highlights a strong element in Anglican Marian theology that describes Mary's body and soul having been assumed into Heaven.

=== Relationship with Elizabeth Siddal ===
In 1849 or 1850, Rossetti met Elizabeth Siddal, who had entered the Pre-Raphaelite circle after being noticed by Walter Deverell while working in a milliner's in Leicester Square. Over the next decade, Siddall became Rossetti's muse and pupil, and after 1851, modelled exclusively for him. The couple were married in 1860 after a long engagement, during which Rossetti was serially unfaithful, and Siddal became addicted to laudanum.

In 1862, Siddall died of an overdose of laudanum, shortly after giving birth to a stillborn child. After her death Rossetti became increasingly depressed, and when Elizabeth was buried at Highgate Cemetery, he interred the bulk of his unpublished poems with her, though he later had them dug up. He idealised her image as Dante's Beatrice in a number of paintings, such as Beata Beatrix.

=== A new direction ===
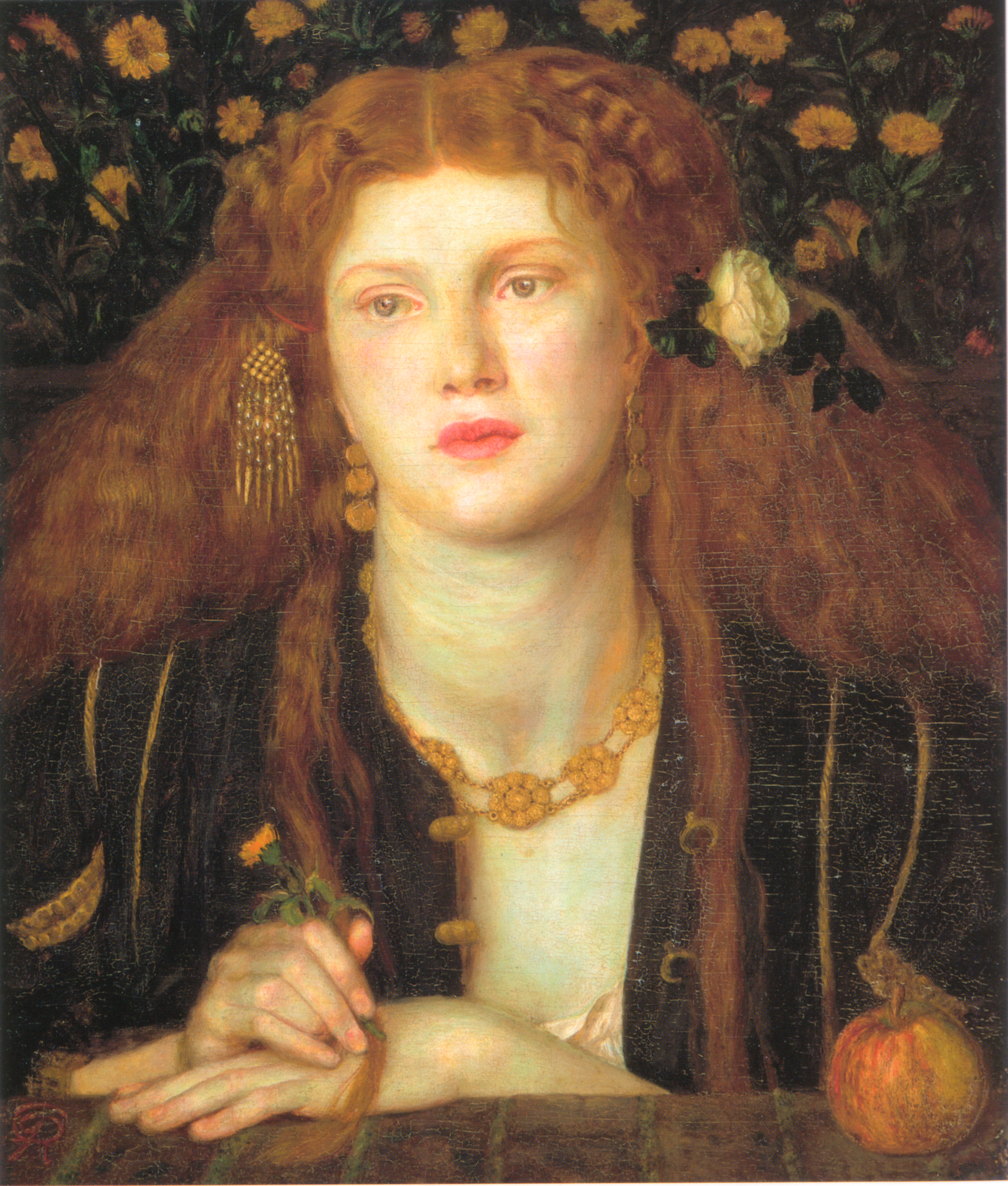
Bocca Baciata (1859), modelled by Fanny Cornforth, signalled a new direction in Rossetti's work. (Museum of Fine Arts, Boston)

Around 1860, Rossetti returned to oil painting, abandoning the dense medieval compositions of the 1850s in favour of powerful close-up images of women in flat pictorial spaces characterised by dense colour. These paintings became a major influence on the development of the European Symbolist movement. These new works were based not on mediaevalism, but on the Italian High Renaissance artists of Venice, Titian and Veronese.

In 1861, Rossetti became a founding partner in the decorative arts firm Morris, Marshall, Faulkner & Co. with Morris, Burne-Jones, Ford Madox Brown, Philip Webb, Charles Faulkner and Peter Paul Marshall. Rossetti contributed designs for stained glass and other decorative objects.

=== Cheyne Walk years ===
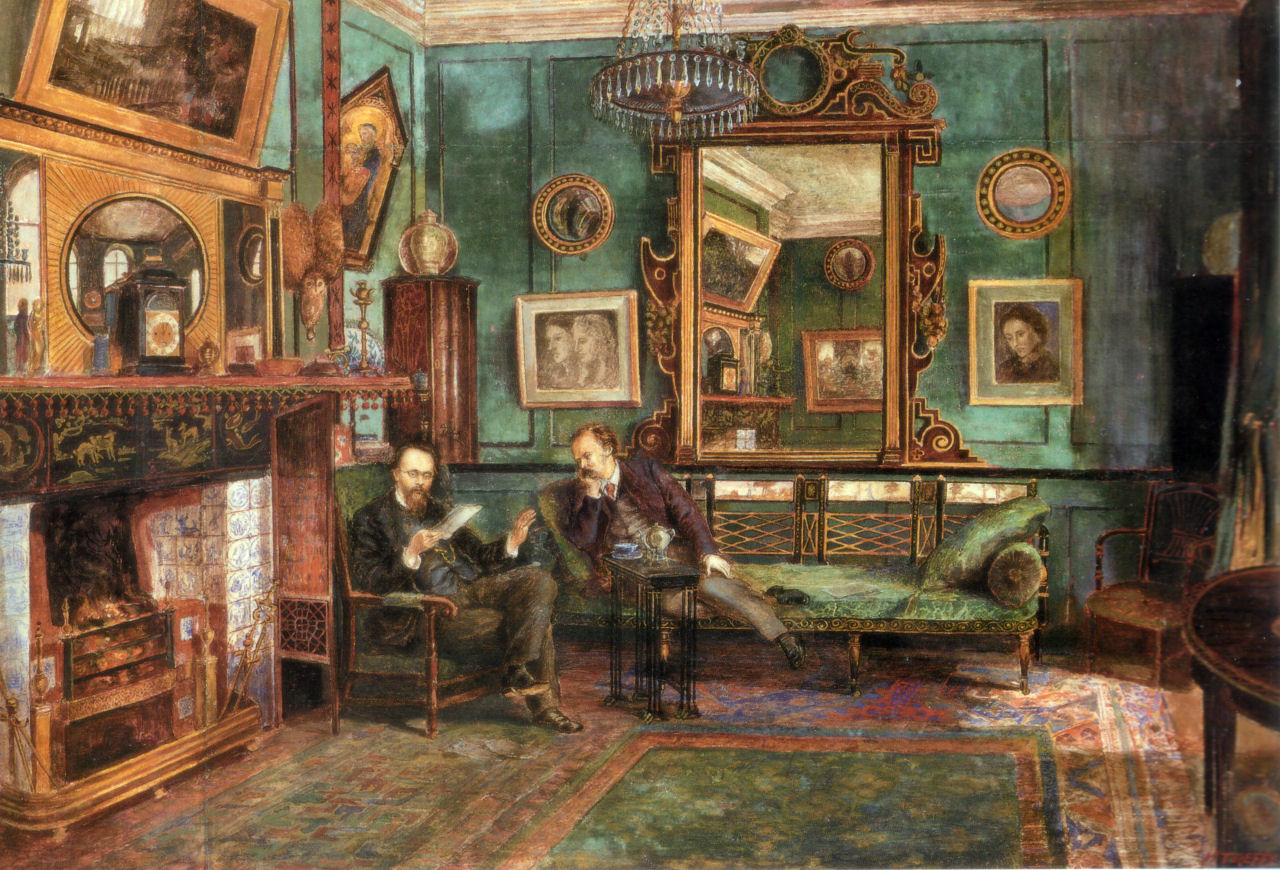
Rossetti reading proofs of Ballads and Sonnets at 16 Cheyne Walk, by Henry Treffry Dunn (1882)

After the death of his wife, Rossetti leased a Tudor House at 16, Cheyne Walk, in Chelsea, where he lived for 20 years, surrounded by extravagant furnishings and a parade of exotic birds and animals. Rossetti was fascinated with wombats, asking friends to meet him at the "Wombat's Lair" at the London Zoo in Regent's Park, and spending hours there. In September 1869, he acquired the first of two pet wombats, which he named "Top". It was brought to the dinner table and allowed to sleep in the large centrepiece during meals. Rossetti's fascination with exotic animals continued throughout his life, culminating in the purchase of a llama and a toucan, which he dressed in a cowboy hat and trained to ride the llama round the dining table for his amusement.

During this period, Rossetti maintained Fanny Cornforth (described by William Allington as Rossetti's "housekeeper") in her own establishment nearby in Chelsea, and painted many voluptuous images of her between 1863 and 1865.

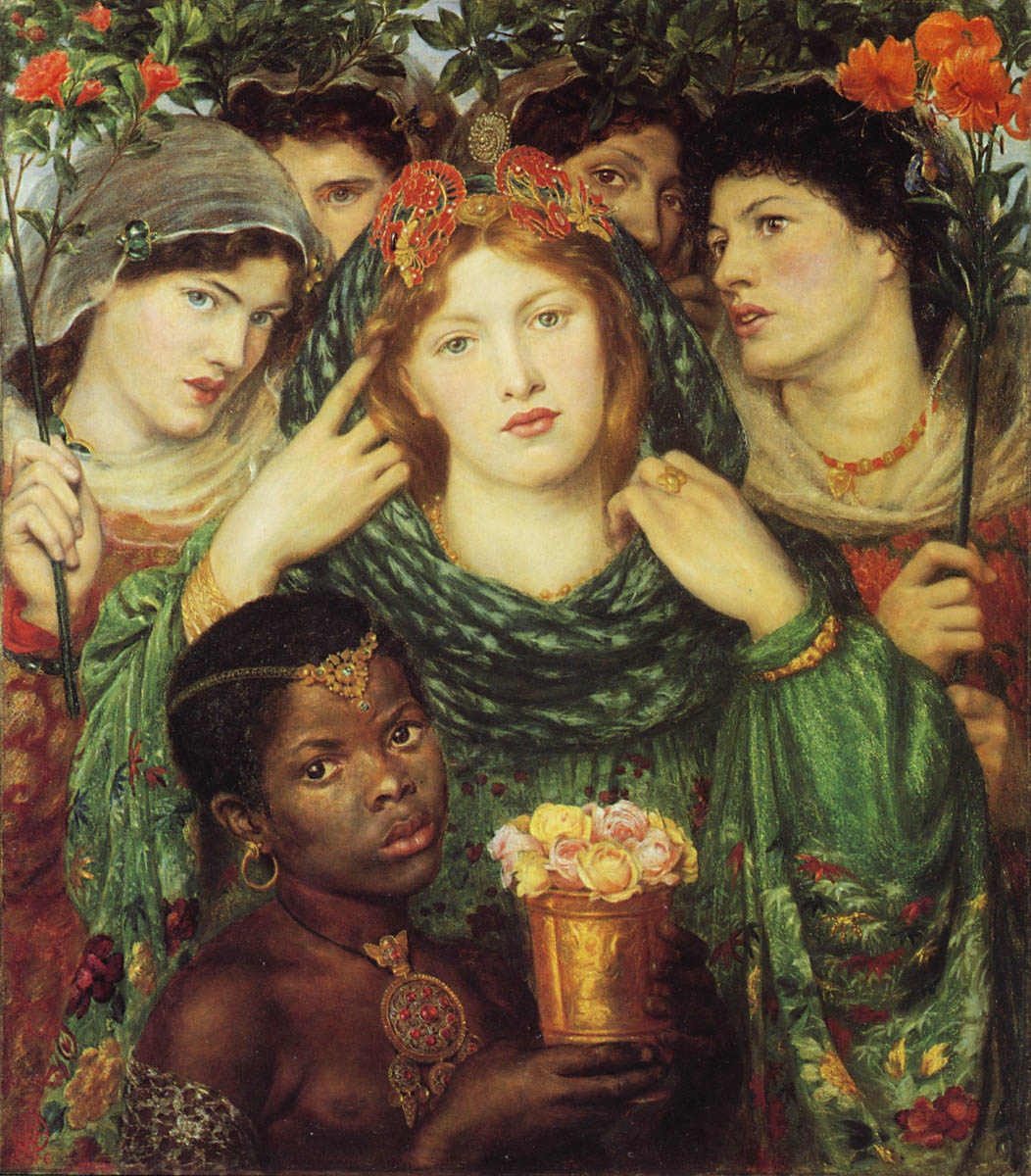
The Beloved (1865–1866) (Models:Marie Ford, Ellen Smith, Fanny Eaton, Keomi), Tate

In 1865, he discovered auburn-haired Alexa Wilding, a dressmaker and would-be actress who was engaged to model for him on a full-time basis and sat for Veronica Veronese, The Blessed Damozel, A Sea–Spell, and other paintings. She sat for more of his finished works than any other model, but comparatively little is known about her due to the lack of any romantic connection with Rossetti. He spotted Wilding one evening in the Strand in 1865 and was immediately struck by her beauty. She agreed to sit for him the following day, but failed to arrive. He spotted her again weeks later, jumped from the cab he was in and persuaded her to go straight to his studio. He paid her a weekly fee to sit for him exclusively, afraid that other artists might employ her. They shared a lasting bond; after Rossetti's death, Wilding travelled regularly to place a wreath on his grave.

Jane Morris, whom Rossetti had used as a model for the Oxford Union murals he painted with William Morris and Edward Burne-Jones in 1857, also sat for him during these years; she "consumed and obsessed him in paint, poetry, and life". Jane Morris was also photographed by John Robert Parsons, whose photographs were painted by Rossetti. In 1869, Morris and Rossetti rented a country house, Kelmscott Manor at Kelmscott, Oxfordshire, as a summer home, but it became a retreat for Rossetti and Jane Morris. They spent summers there with the Morrises' children, while William Morris travelled to Iceland in 1871 and 1873.

During these years, Rossetti was prevailed upon by friends, in particular Charles Augustus Howell, to exhume his poems from his wife's grave. In 1869 he did so, collating and publishing them in 1870 in the volume Poems by D. G. Rossetti. The collection included some translations, such as his "Ballad Of Dead Ladies", an 1869 translation of François Villon's poem "Ballade des dames du temps jadis". (The word "yesteryear" is credited to Rossetti as a neologism used for the first time in this translation.)

Rossetti's first collection of poetry was met with a savage reaction from critics. In an article in The Contemporary Review for October 1871, poet and critic Robert Buchanan attacked both the poems and Rossetti's morality. Against the advice of his brother William Michael, Rossetti issued a written reply in December, resulting in an extended essay from Buchanan, published as a 100-page pamphlet in May 1872, entitled: The Fleshly School of Poetry and Other Phenomena of the Day.

== Decline and death ==
This criticism of his poems contributed to Rossetti's mental breakdown in June 1872, during which he attempted unsuccessfully to kill himself with an overdose of laudanum. After spending nine weeks recuperating in Scotland, he joined Jane Morris at Kelmscott that September; however, he "spent his days in a haze of chloral and whisky". The next summer he was much improved, and both Alexa Wilding and Jane sat for him at Kelmscott, where he created a soulful series of dream-like portraits. In 1874, Morris reorganised his decorative arts firm, cutting Rossetti out of the business, and the polite fiction that both men were in residence with Jane at Kelmscott could not be maintained. Rossetti abruptly left Kelmscott in July 1874 and never returned. Toward the end of his life, he sank into a morbid state, darkened by his addiction to chloral hydrate and increasing mental instability. He spent his last years as a virtual recluse at Cheyne Walk.

In 1881, Rossetti published a second volume of poems, Ballads and Sonnets, which included the remaining sonnets from The House of Life sequence.

On 11 December 1881, he suffered a mild stroke, leaving his sight dim and his left side paralysed. He had been mostly housebound for some years on account of his obesity, possible diabetes, chloral addiction, and excessive intake of alcohol, especially whisky. On 4 February 1882, he travelled to the country house of a friend, Westcliff Bungalow, (Note: The dwelling, which was designed and built by a well-known London architect John Seddon, became known as the Rossetti Bungalow. Despite loud protests by residents of the town, in 1966, Margate Borough Council, approved plans for it to be demolished. The site was redeveloped for seven new houses. A small blue plaque remains on the wall of 2, Shakespeare Road, to denote Rossetti's brief residence.) in Birchington-on-Sea, Kent, in a vain attempt to recover his health. On 10 April, Easter Sunday, Rossetti died there; the cause was listed as Bright's disease, a disorder of the kidneys from which he had been suffering for some time.

He was buried in the churchyard of All Saints in Birchington-on-Sea. (Note: In 1876, Rossetti had left written instructions with his assistant Henry Treffry Dunn in the event of his death: "If I die suddenly at any moment, it is my special last wish that my remains may be burnt," he wrote. "Let no cast be taken on any account of my face or head and let no one come near my body except in your presence or in that of my brother. Let me not on any account be buried at Highgate, but my remains burnt as I say ..." It is unclear whether Rossetti's family were ever aware of these instructions. After his death, William Morris arranged for a memorial cast of Gabriel's head and hand; his pious sisters would have had a fear of cremation, and the first official cremation in the United Kingdom did not take place until 1885; and 'for more than one reason' those present determined that burial should be at Birchington, rather than in the Rossetti family grave in Highgate where his father and wife Lizzie were already buried, and were later joined by his mother, William and his wife Lucy, and Christina.) under a tombstone designed by Ford Madox Brown.

== Collections and critical assessment ==
Tate Britain, Birmingham, Manchester, Salford Museum and Art Galleries and Wightwick Manor National Trust all contain large collections of Rossetti's work; Salford was bequeathed a number of works following the death of L. S. Lowry in 1976. Lowry was president of the Newcastle-based 'Rossetti Society', which was founded in 1966. Lowry's private collection of works was chiefly built around Rossetti's paintings and sketches of Elizabeth Siddal and Jane Morris, and notable pieces included Pandora, Proserpine and a drawing of Annie Miller.

In an interview with Mervyn Levy, Lowry explained his fascination with the Rossetti women in relation to his own work: "I don't like his women at all, but they fascinate me, like a snake. That's why I always buy Rossetti whenever I can. His women are really rather horrible. It's like a friend of mine who says he hates my work, although it fascinates him." The friend Lowry referred to was businessman Monty Bloom, to whom he also explained his obsession with Rossetti's portraits: "They are not real women.[...] They are dreams.[...] He used them for something in his mind caused by the death of his wife. I may be quite wrong there, but significantly they all came after the death of his wife."

The popularity, frequent reproduction, and general availability of Rossetti's later paintings of women have led to this association with "a morbid and languorous sensuality". His small-scale early works and drawings are less well known, but it is in these that his originality, technical inventiveness, and significance in the movement away from Academic tradition can best be seen. As Roger Fry wrote in 1916, "Rossetti more than any other artist since Blake may be hailed as a forerunner of the new ideas" in English Art.

== Media ==
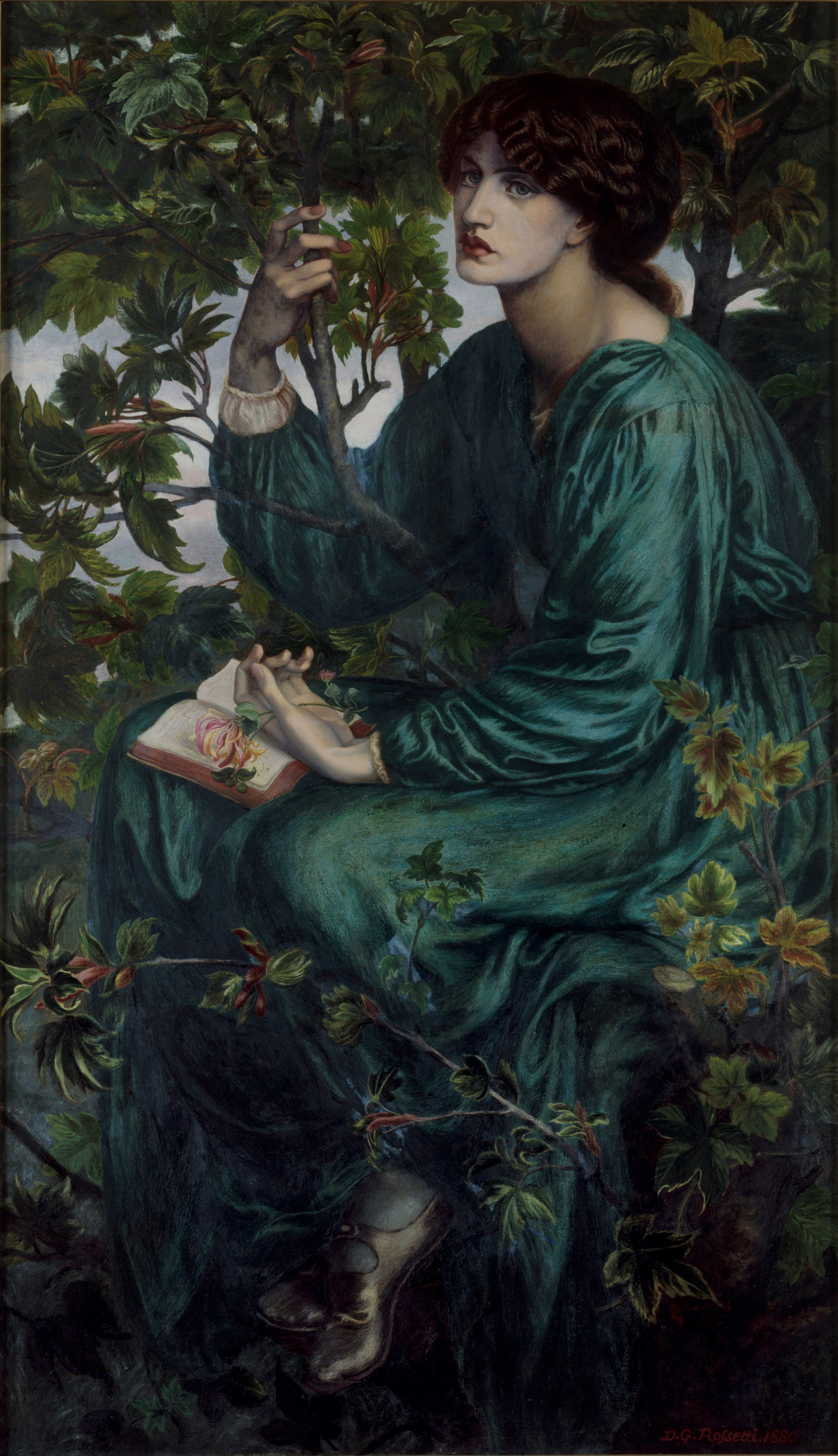
The Day Dream (1880). The sitter is Jane Morris.

Rossetti was played by Oliver Reed in Ken Russell's television film Dante's Inferno (1967). The Pre-Raphaelite Brotherhood has been the subject of two BBC period dramas. The first, The Love School, (1975) features Ben Kingsley as Rossetti. The second was Desperate Romantics, in which Rossetti is played by Aidan Turner. It was broadcast on BBC Two on Tuesday, 21 July 2009.

The character of Dr. Frasier Crane (Kelsey Grammer) appears in an episode of Cheers as Dante Gabriel Rossetti for his Halloween costume. His wife, Dr. Lilith Sternin-Crane, appears as Rossetti's sister Christina.

== Fiction ==
Gabriel Rossetti and other members of the Rossetti family are characters in Tim Powers' 2012 novel Hide Me Among the Graves, in which both the Rossettis' uncle John Polidori and Gabriel's wife Elizabeth act as hosts for vampiric beings, and whose influence inspires the artistic genius of the family.

Rossetti is mentioned and discussed in Tom Stoppard’s adaptation of Parade’s End, based on the book series by Ford Madox Ford.

== Musical settings ==
Rossetti's poem "The Blessed Damozel" was the inspiration for Claude Debussy's cantata La Damoiselle élue (1888).

William Wallace's symphonic poem Sister Helen was first performed at the Crystal Palace in London on 25 February 1899.

In 1904 Ralph Vaughan Williams (1872–1958) created his song cycle The House of Life from six poems by Rossetti. One song in that cycle, "Silent Noon", is one of Vaughan Williams's best-known and most frequently performed songs.

Edward Elgar's part song Go, Song of Mine (1909) is a setting of words by Guido Cavalcanti, translated into English by Rossetti.

Cyril Scott set the poem An Old Song Ended in 1911.

Dame Ethel Smyth's setting of "Sleepless Dreams" for chorus and orchestra was published in 1912.

John Ireland set "English May" in Songs of a Wayfarer (1912), "Youth's Spring Tribute" and "Penumbra" in Marigold: Impression for Voice and Pianoforte (1913), "The One Hope" in Three Songs (1926), and "During Music" in Two Songs (1928).

== Influence ==
In 1904, Phoebe Anna Traquair painted The Awakening, inspired by a sonnet from Rossetti's The House of Life.

Some paintings by Paula Modersohn-Becker (1876–1907) may have been influenced by Rossetti.

The 1990s grunge band Hole used lines from Rossetti's "Superscription", from House of Life, in their song "Celebrity Skin" from their album Celebrity Skin: while Rossetti's line read "Look in my face; my name is Might-have-been" the Hole lyric is "Look at my face; my name is Might-have-been."

The British release cover for the 1970 David Bowie album The Man Who Sold the World was described by Bowie as a parody of a Rossetti painting.

== Gallery ==
=== Paintings ===
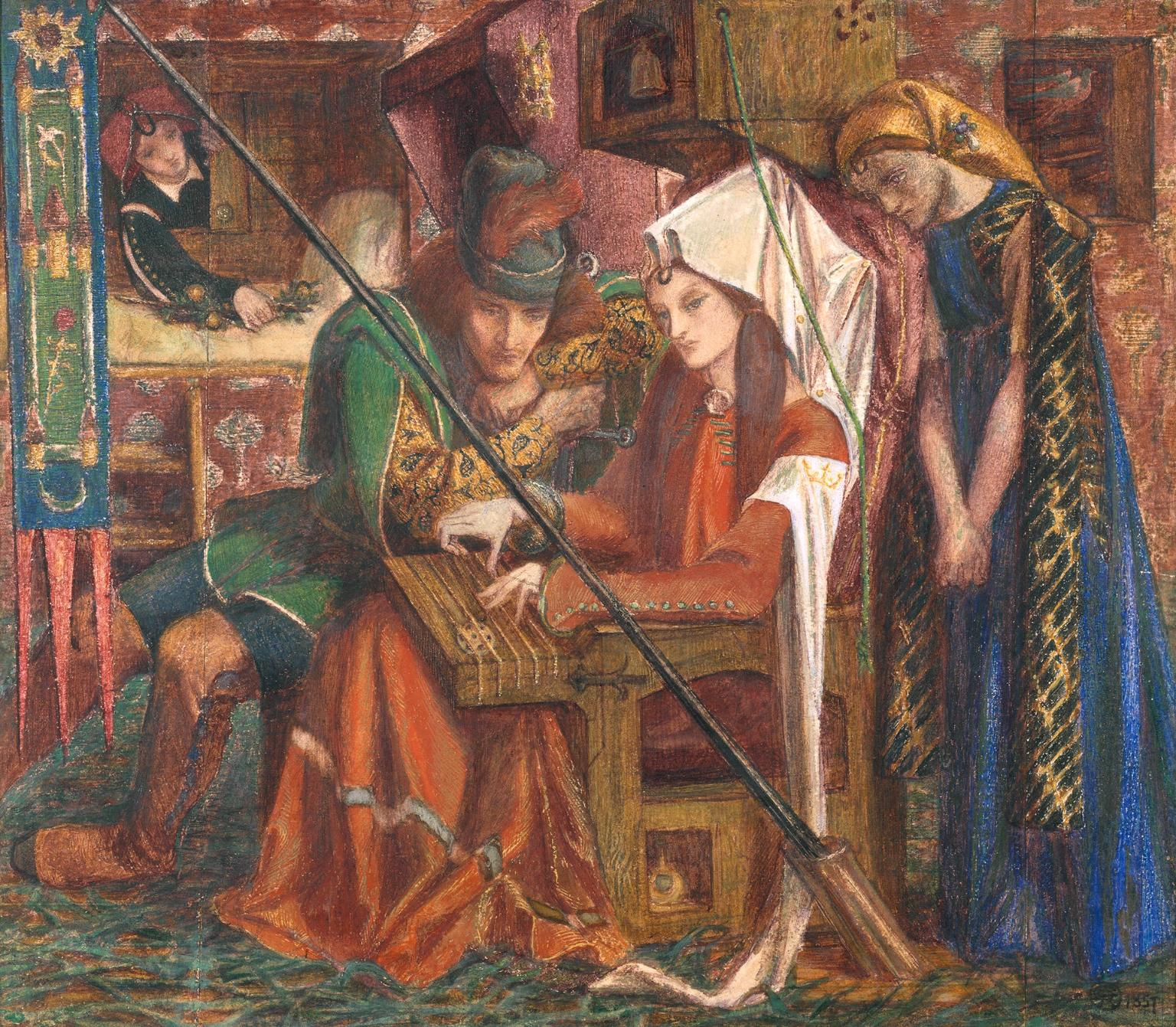
The Tune of the Seven Towers (1857), watercolour, Tate Britain

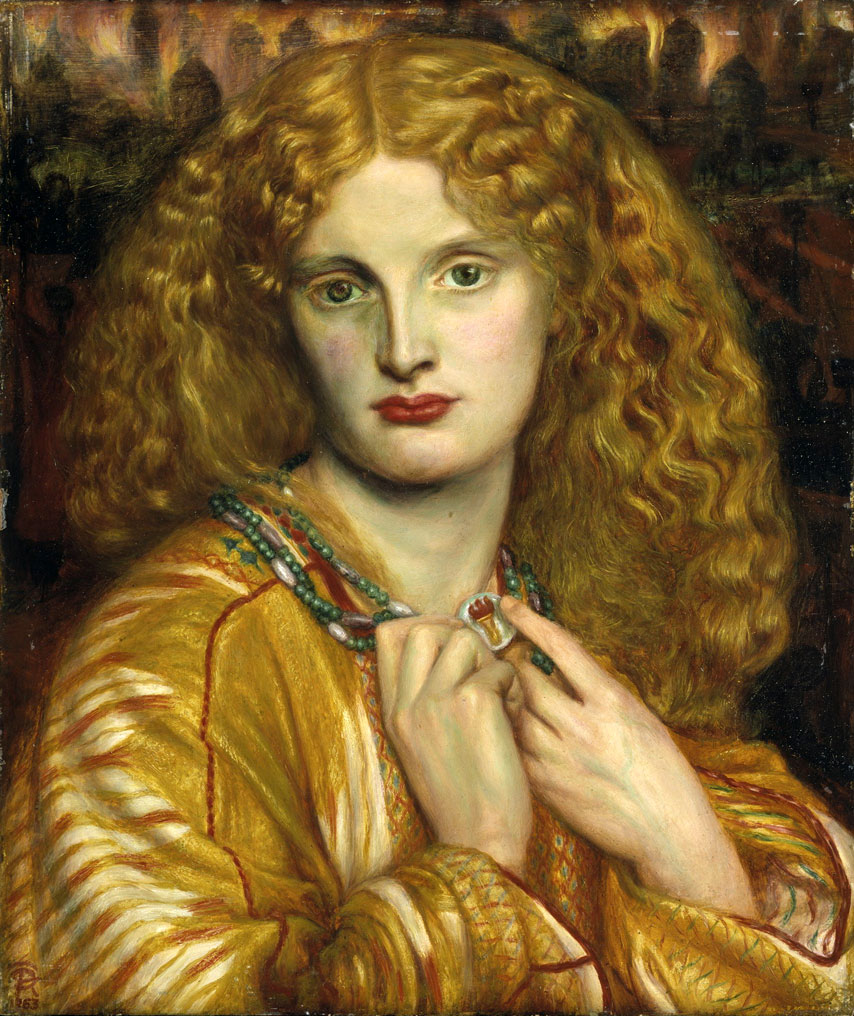
Helen of Troy, 1863, Kunsthalle Hamburg, Hamburg, Germany

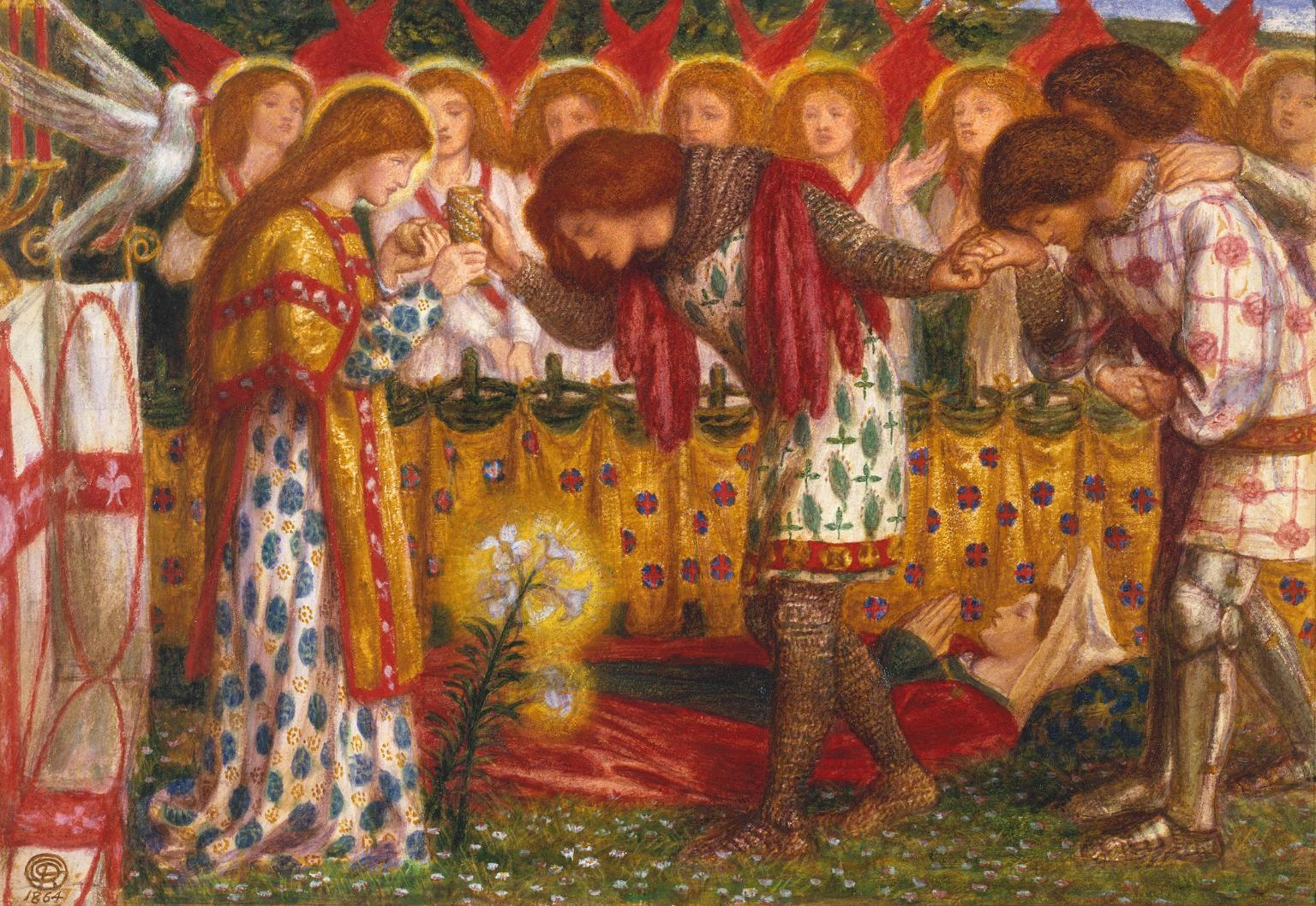
How Sir Galahad. Sir Bors, and Sir Percival were fed with the Sanc Grael; But Sir Percival's Sister Died Along the Way (1864), watercolour, Tate Britain, London

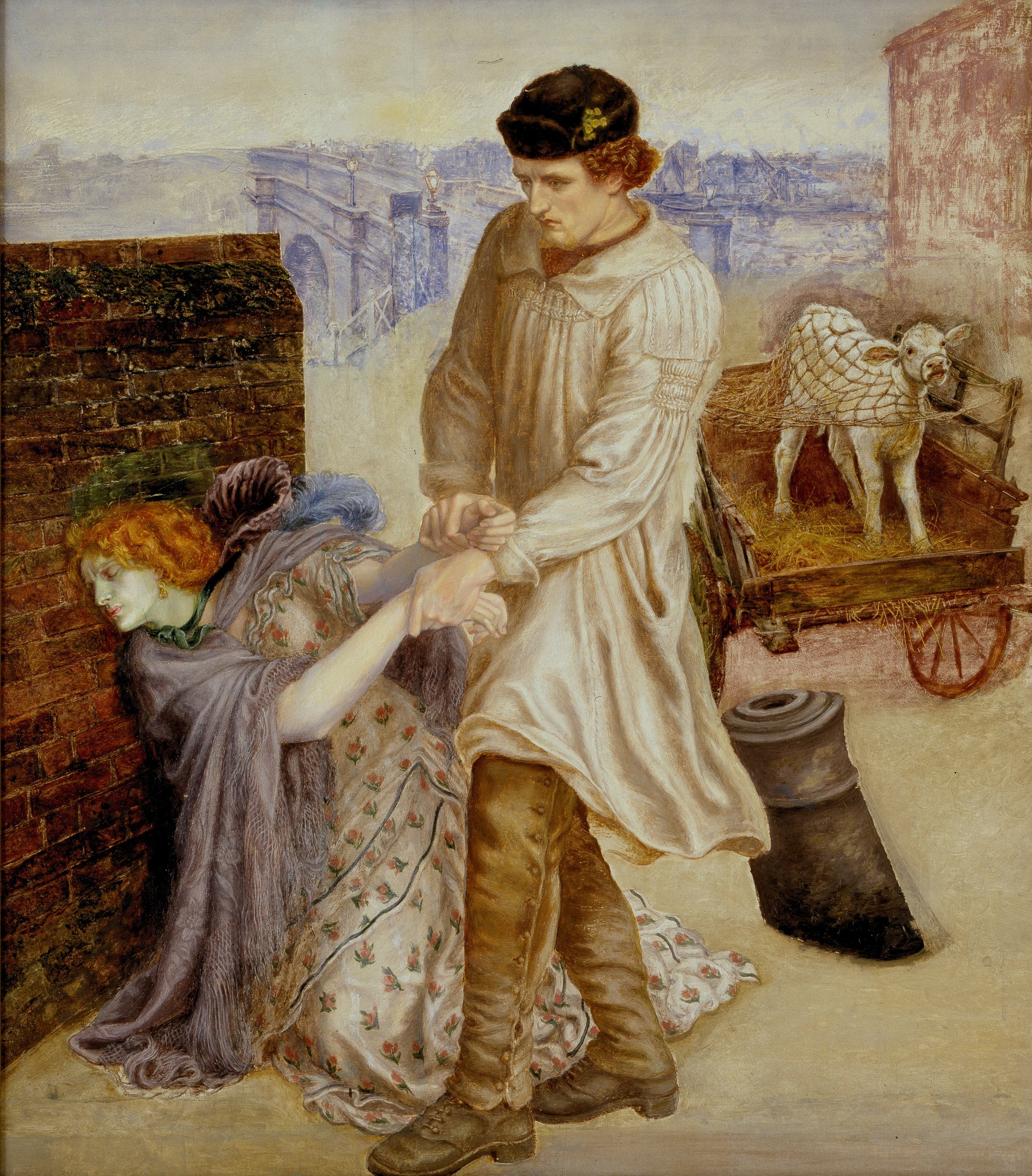
Found (1865–1869, unfinished), Delaware Art Museum

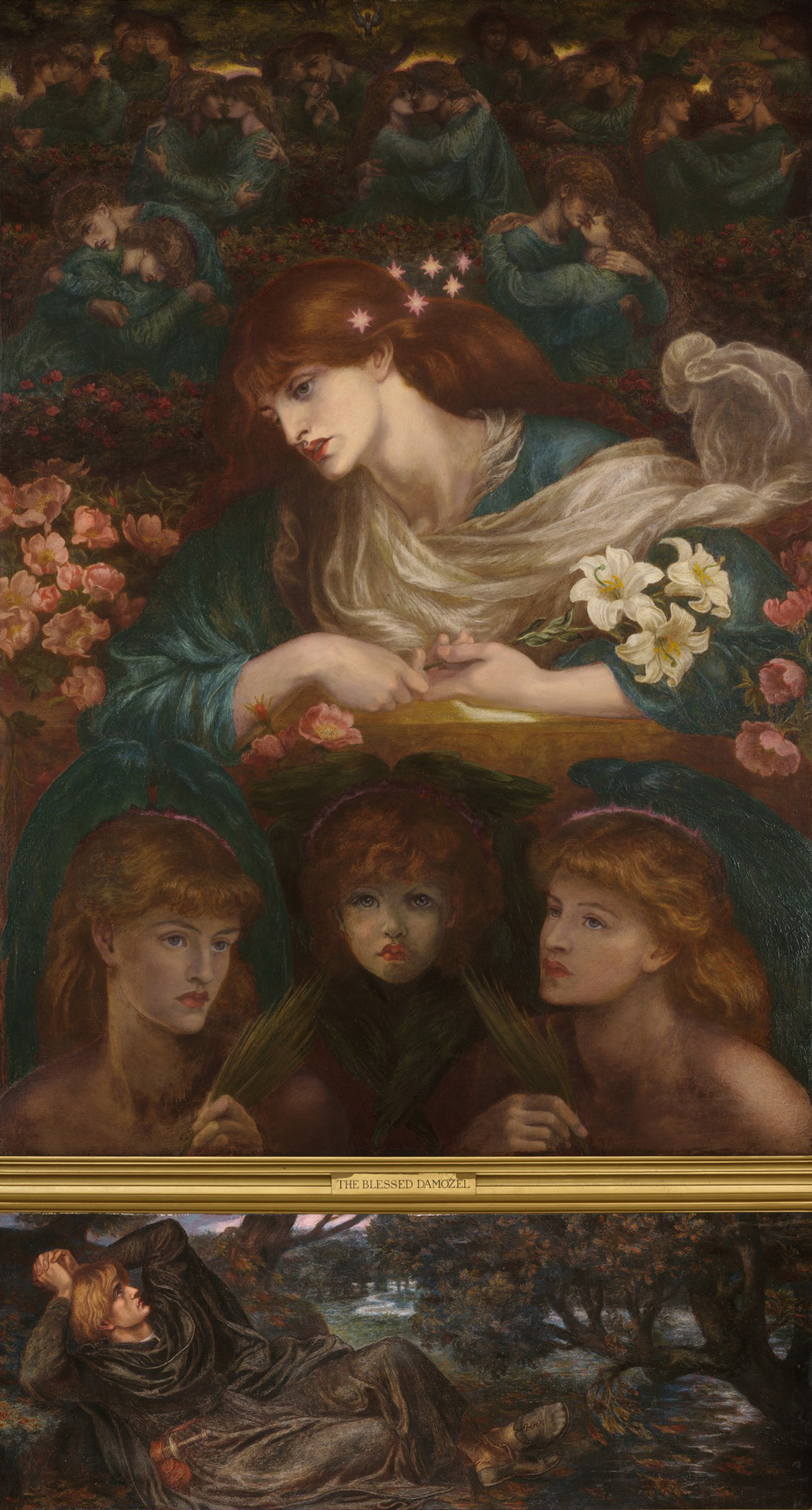
The Blessed Damozel (1871–1878; model: Alexa Wilding)

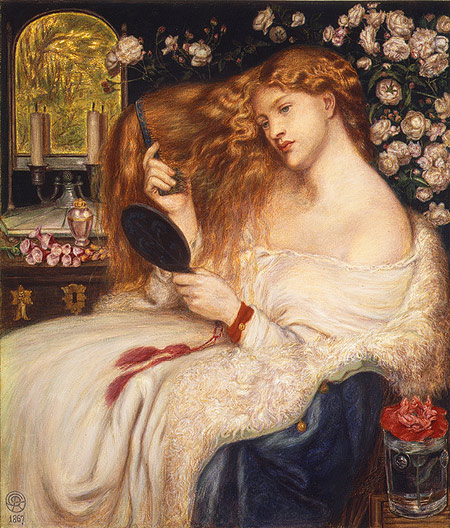
Lady Lilith (1867), Metropolitan Museum of Art (model: Fanny Cornforth)

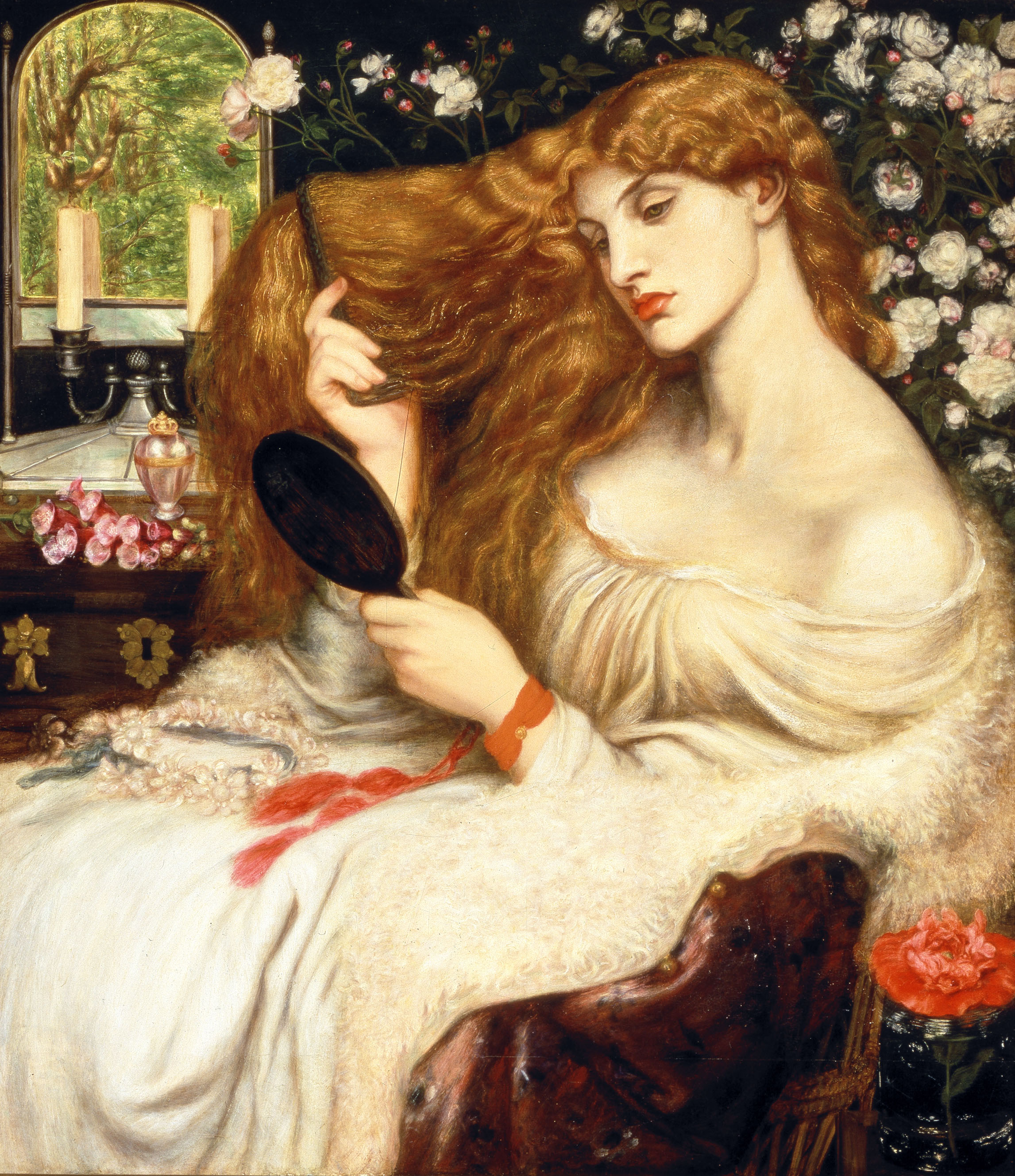
Lady Lilith (1868), Delaware Art Museum (Fanny Cornforth, overpainted at Kelsmcott 1872–73 with the face of Alexa Wilding)

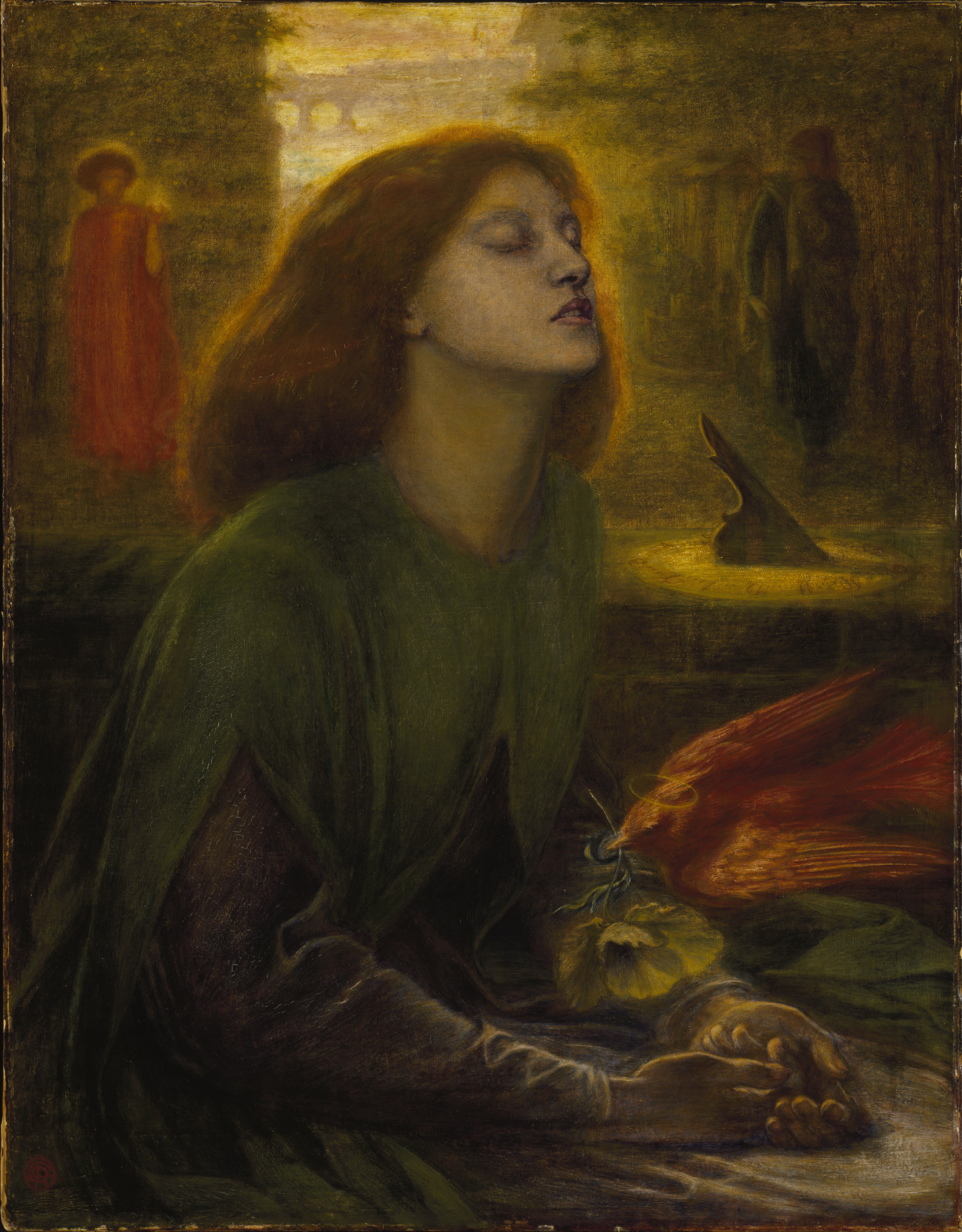
Beata Beatrix (1864–1870), Tate Britain (model: Elizabeth Siddal)

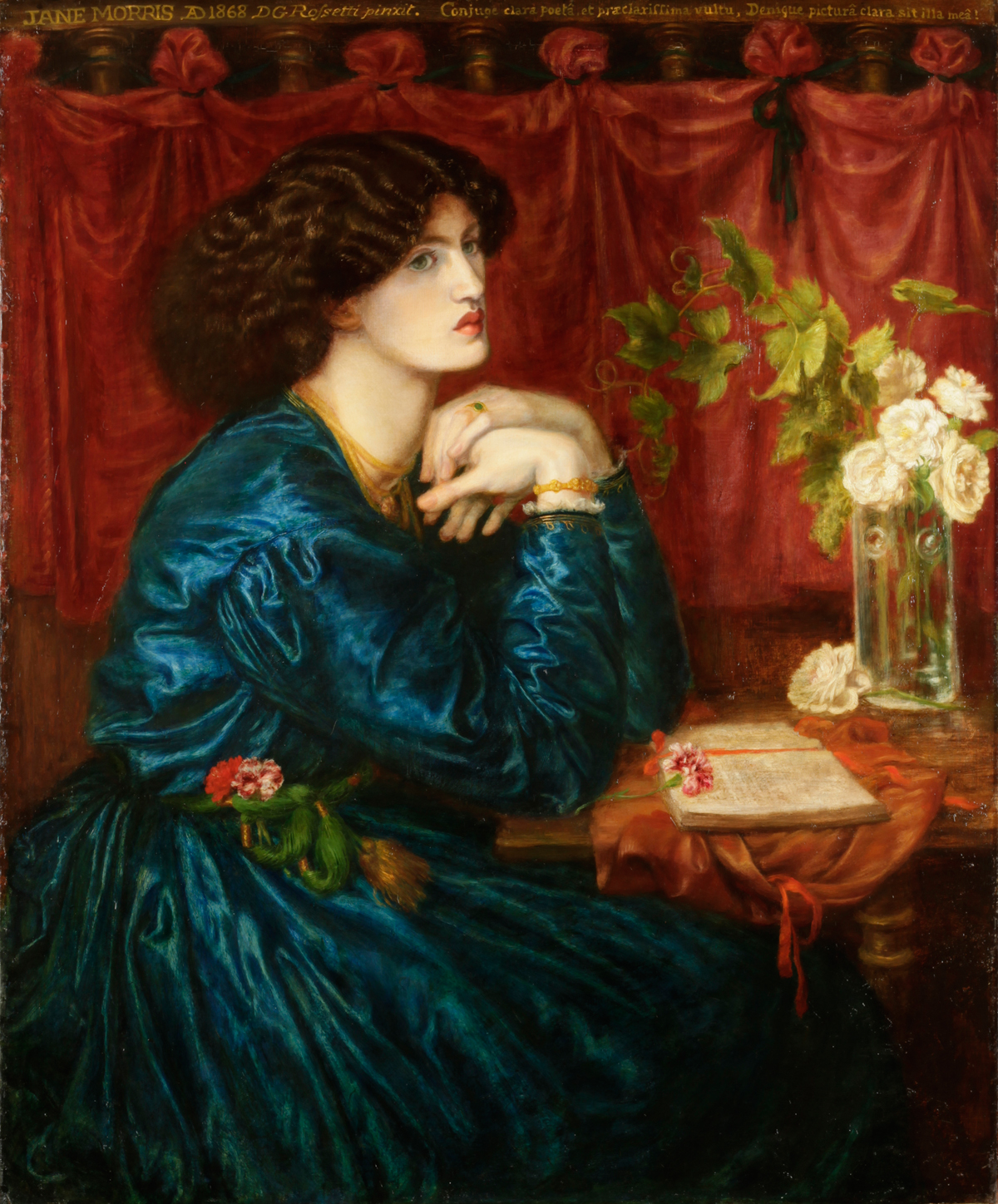
Jane Morris (The Blue Silk Dress) (1868), Kelmscott Manor

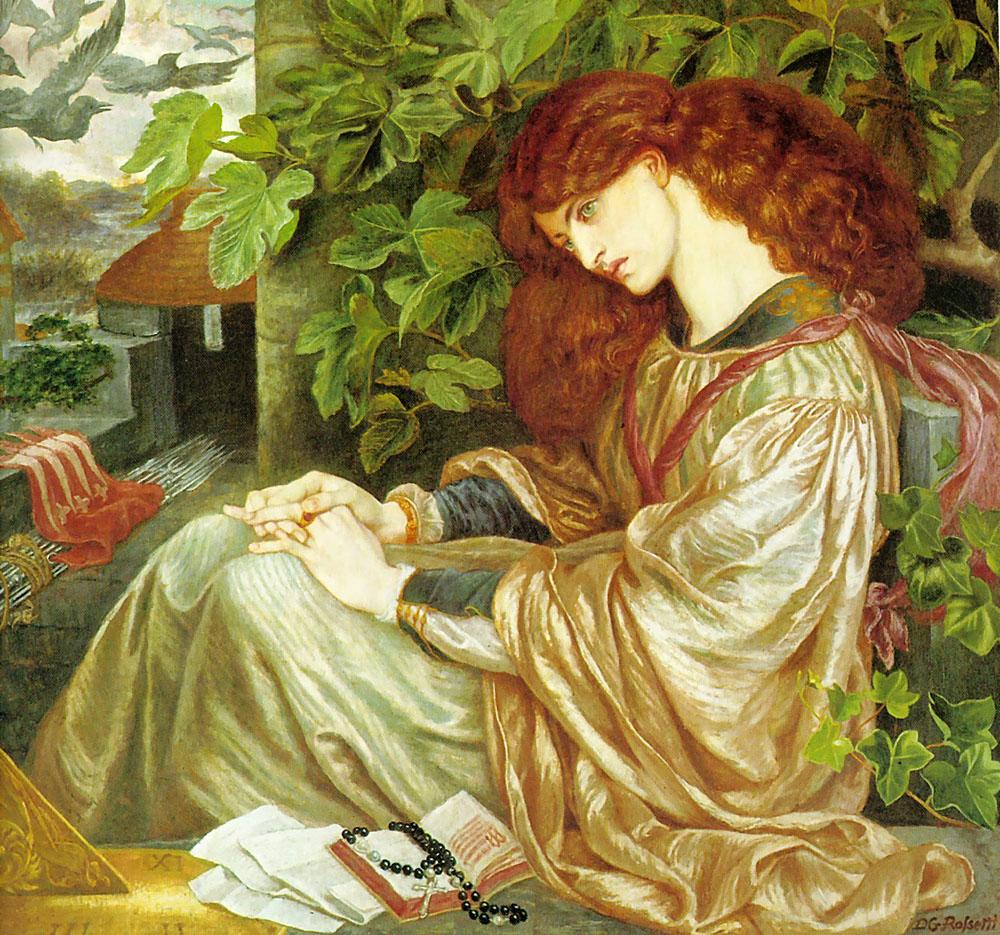
Pia de' Tolomei (1868–1880), Spencer Museum of Art, University of Kansas, Lawrence (model: Jane Morris)

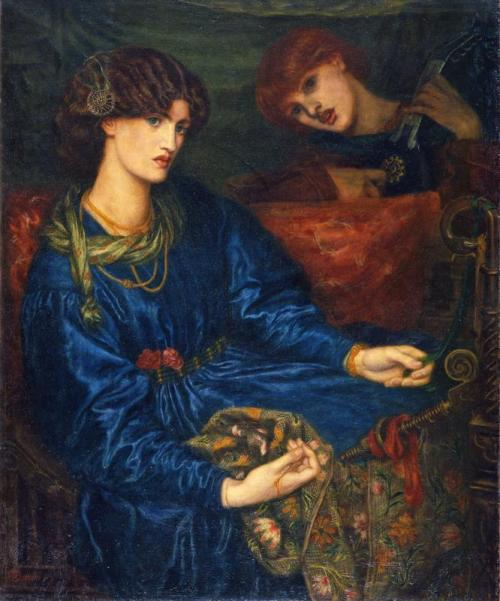
Mariana (1870; model: Jane Morris), Aberdeen Art Gallery

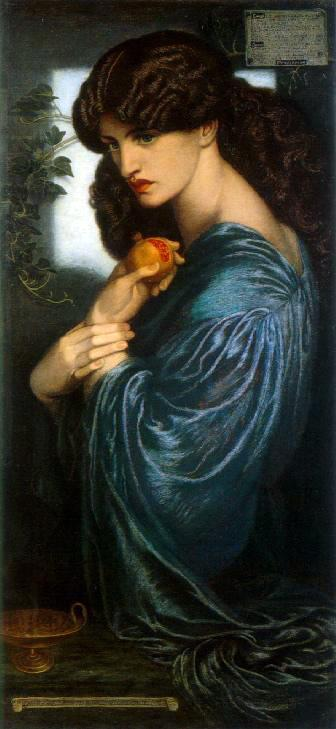
Proserpine (1874; model: Jane Morris) Tate Britain, London

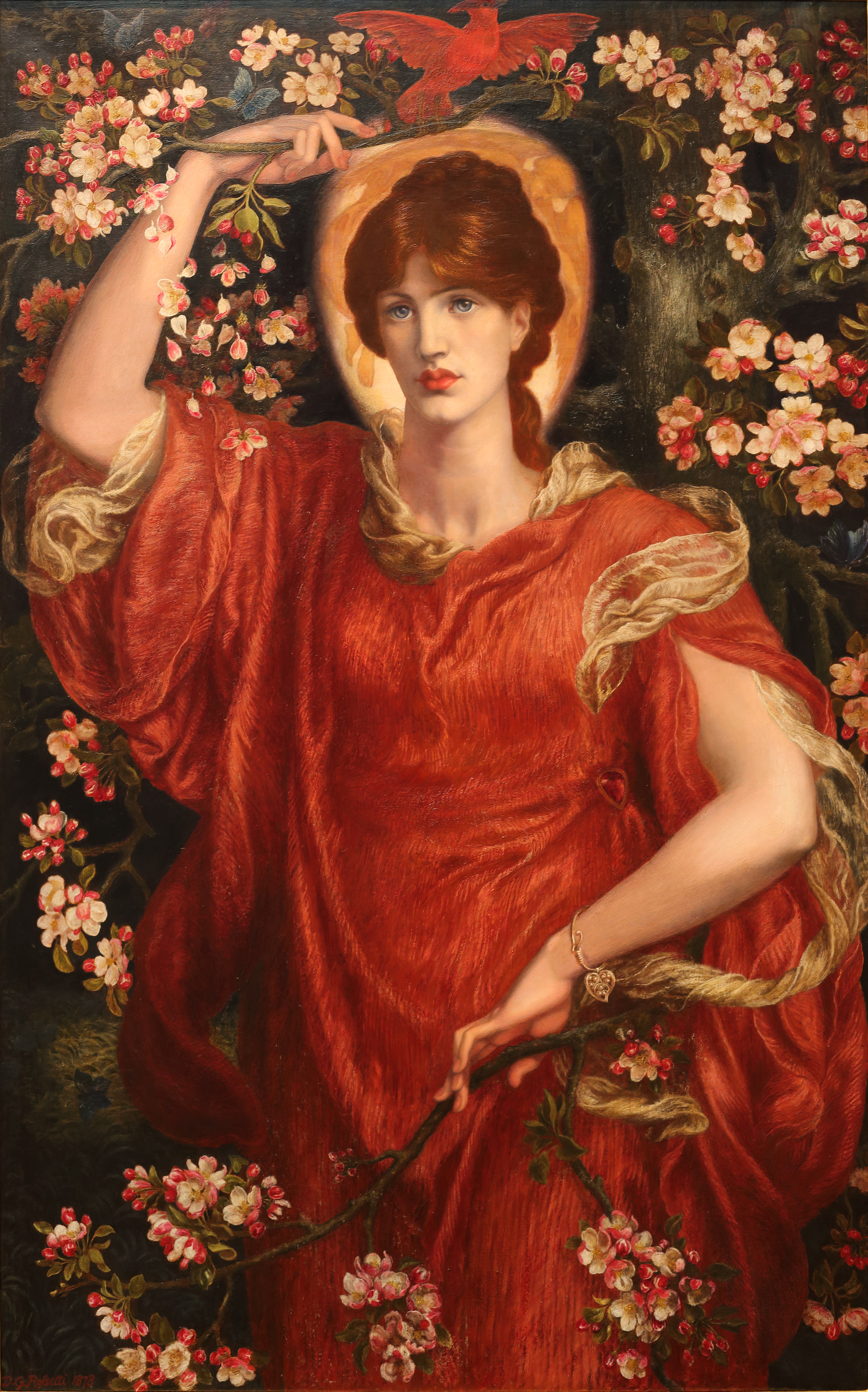
A Vision of Fiammetta (1878), one of Rossetti's last paintings, now in the collection of Andrew Lloyd Webber (model: Marie Spartali Stillman)

=== Drawings ===
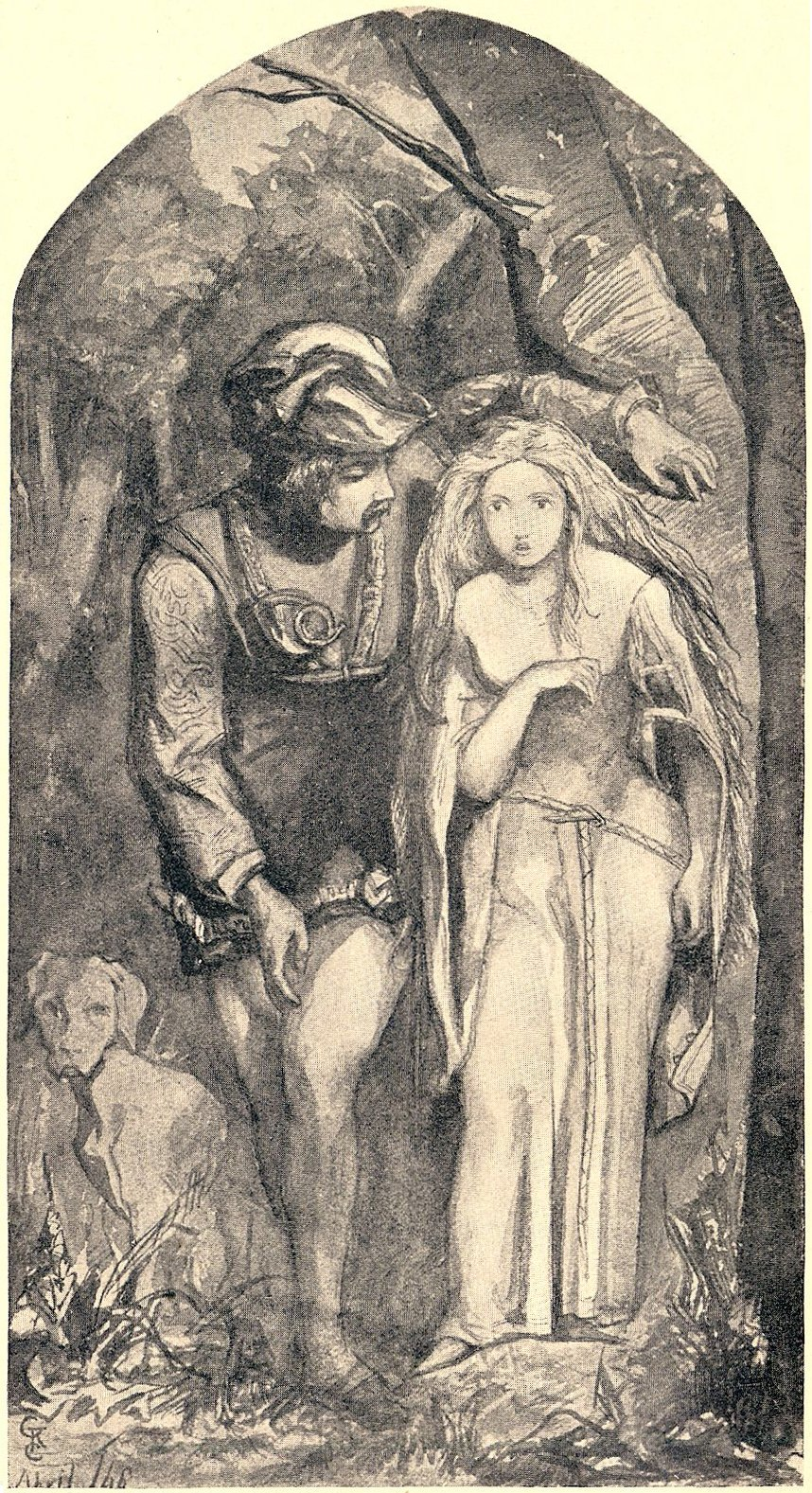
La Belle Dame sans Merci (1848), pen and sepia with some pencil

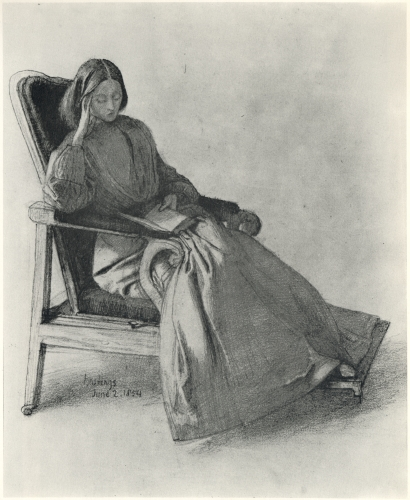
Drawing of Elizabeth Siddal reading (1854)

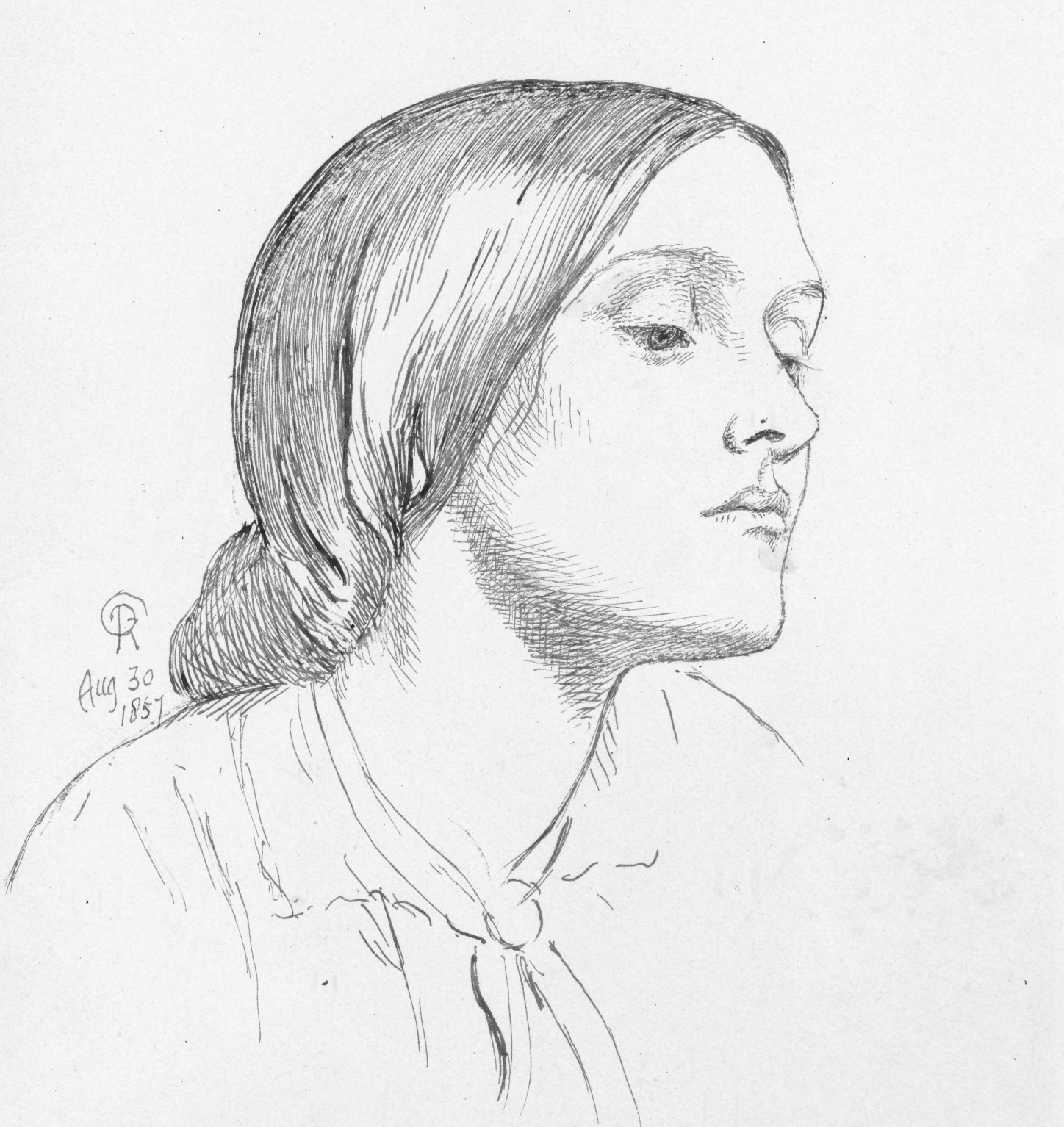
Maria Hungerford Pollen (1857), pen and brown ink

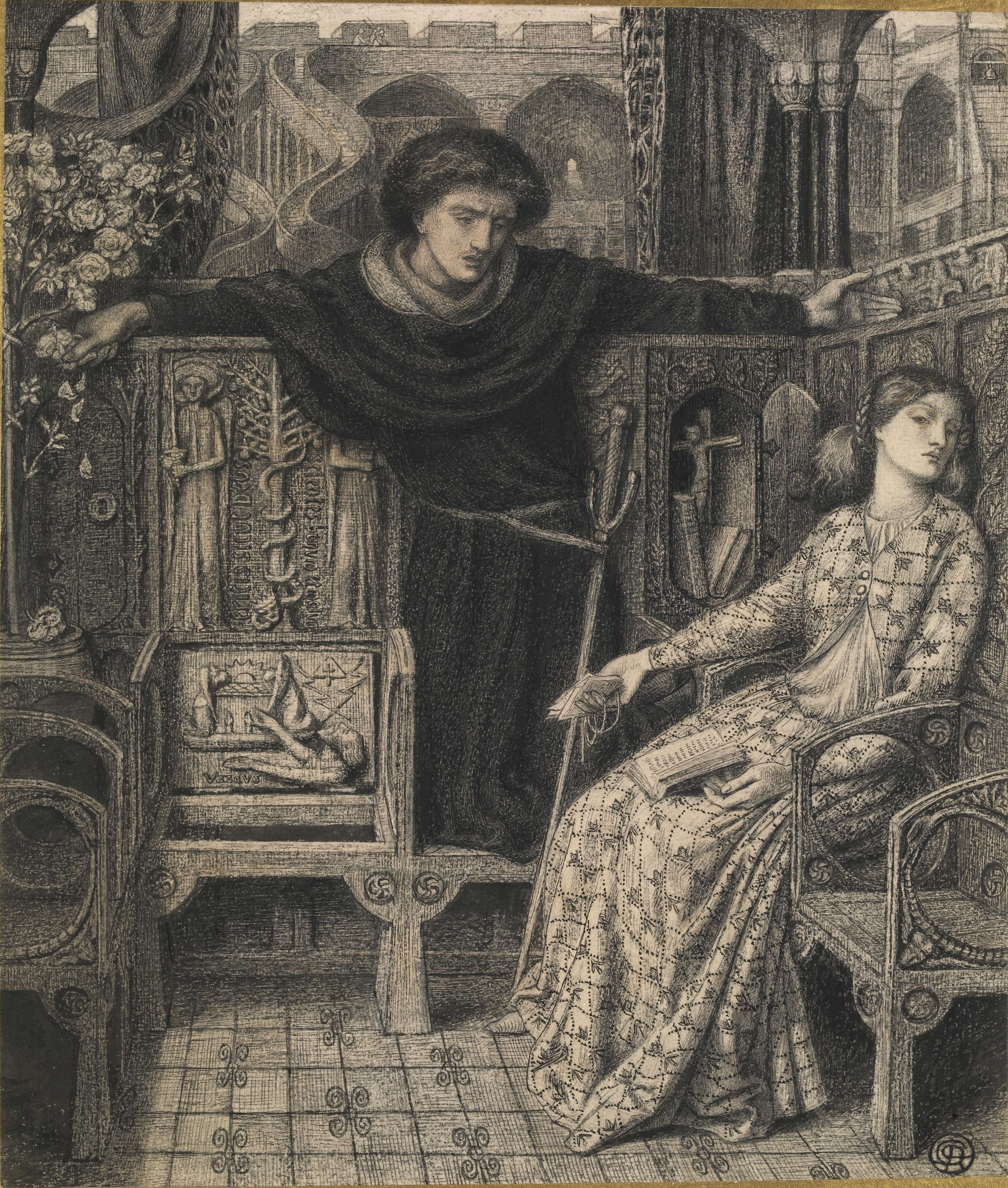
Hamlet and Ophelia (1858), pen and ink drawing

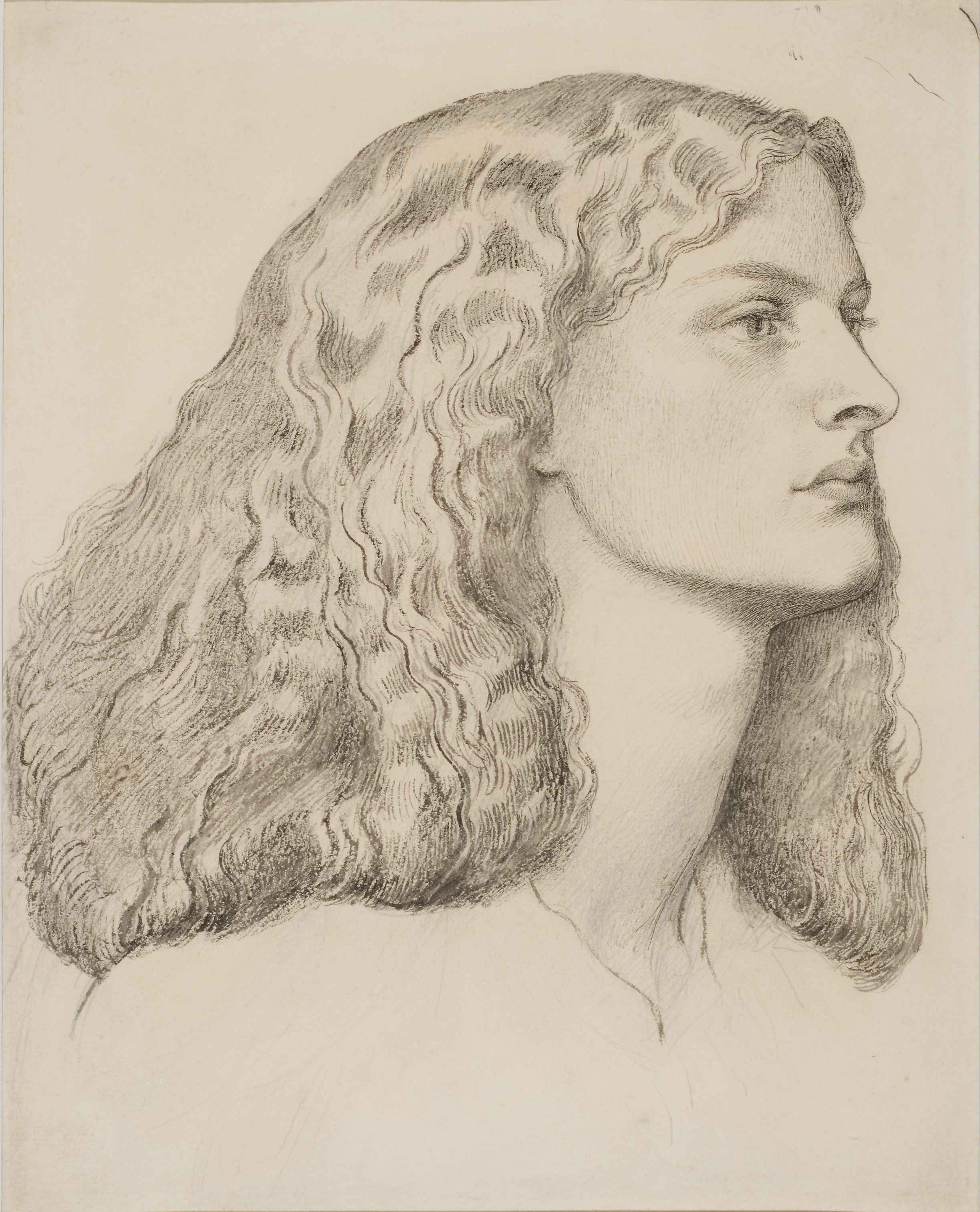
Drawing of Annie Miller (1860)

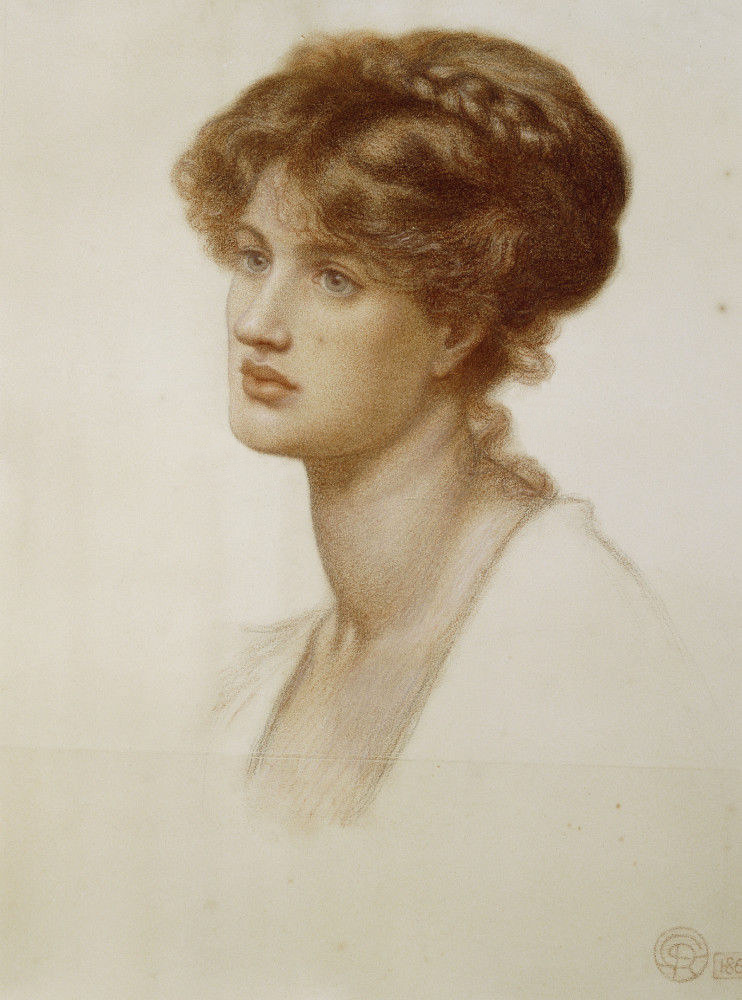
Portrait of Marie Spartali Stillman (1869)

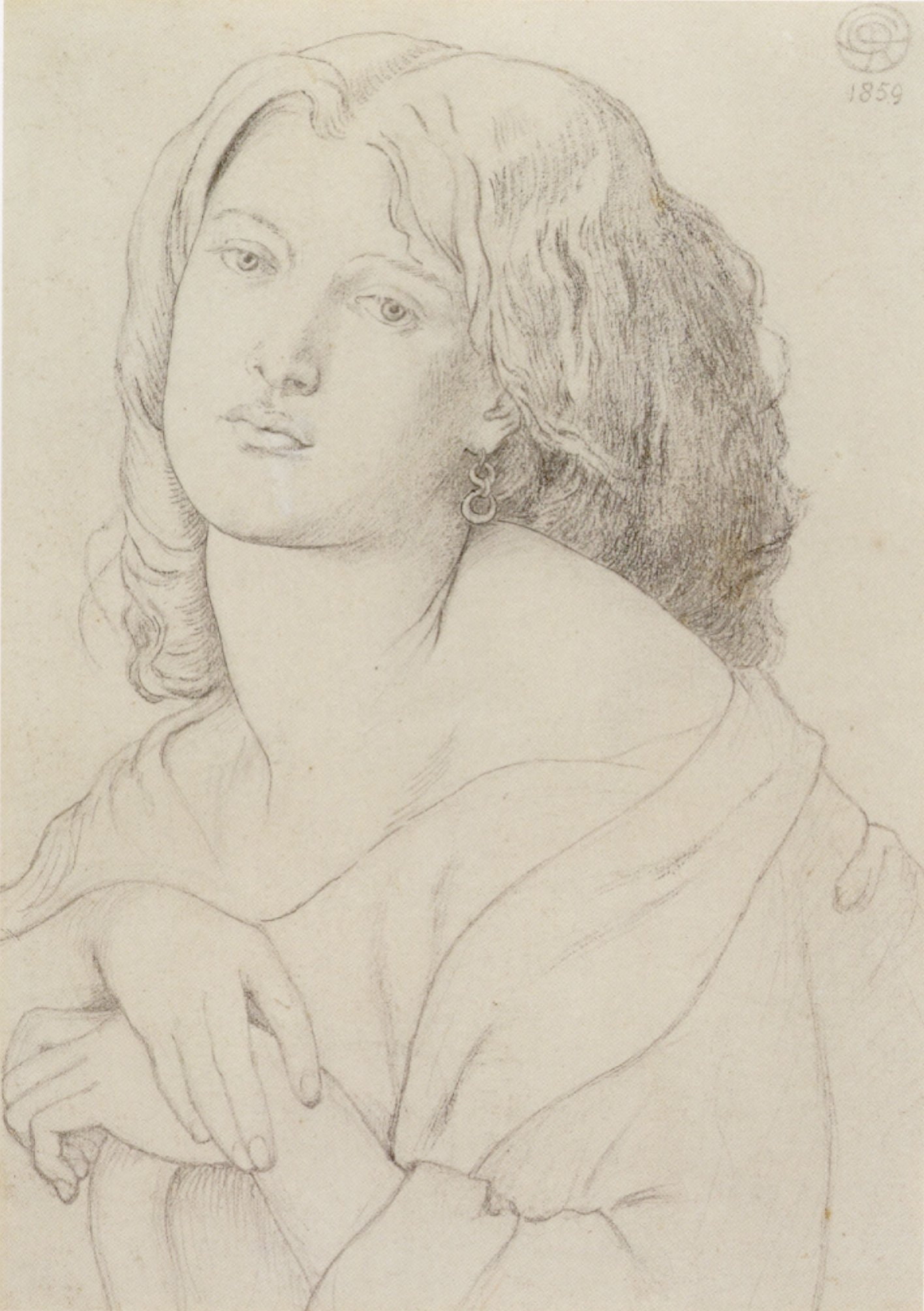
Drawing of Fanny Cornforth, graphite on paper (1869)

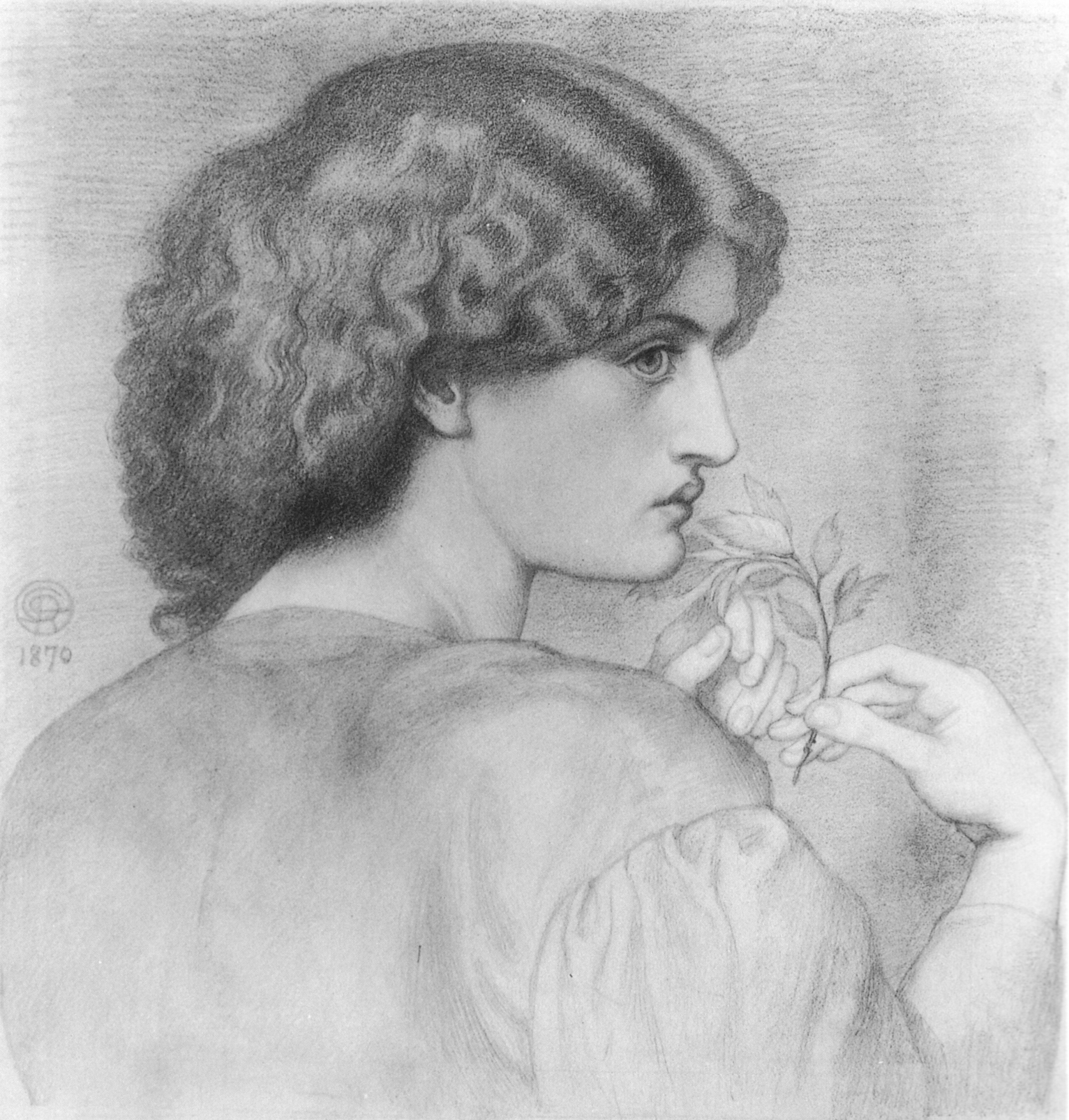
The Roseleaf (Portrait of Jane Morris; 1870), graphite on wove paper

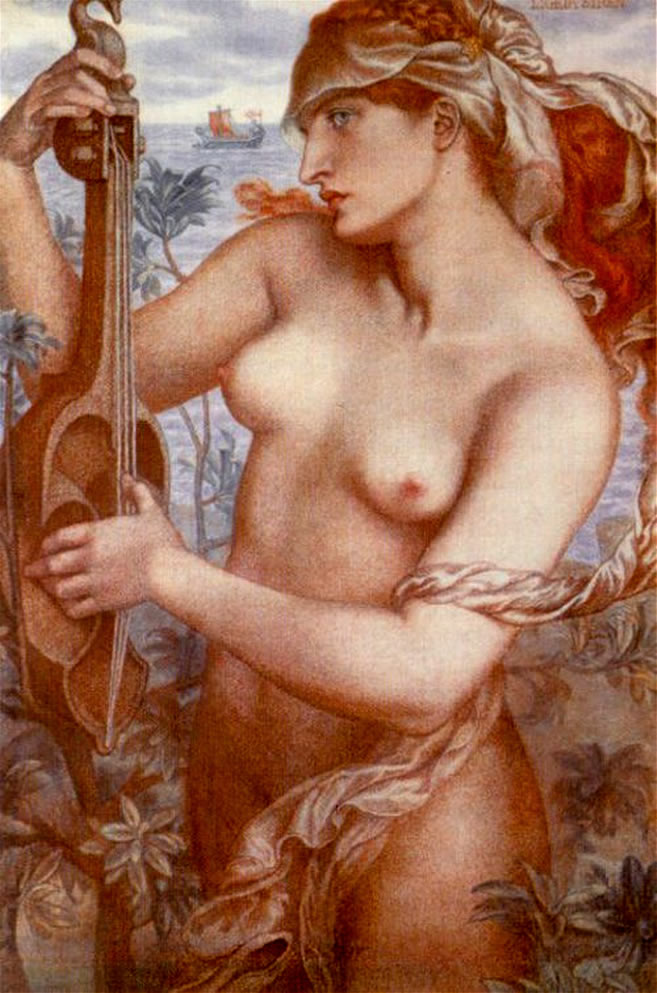
Ligeia Siren (1873), colored chalk

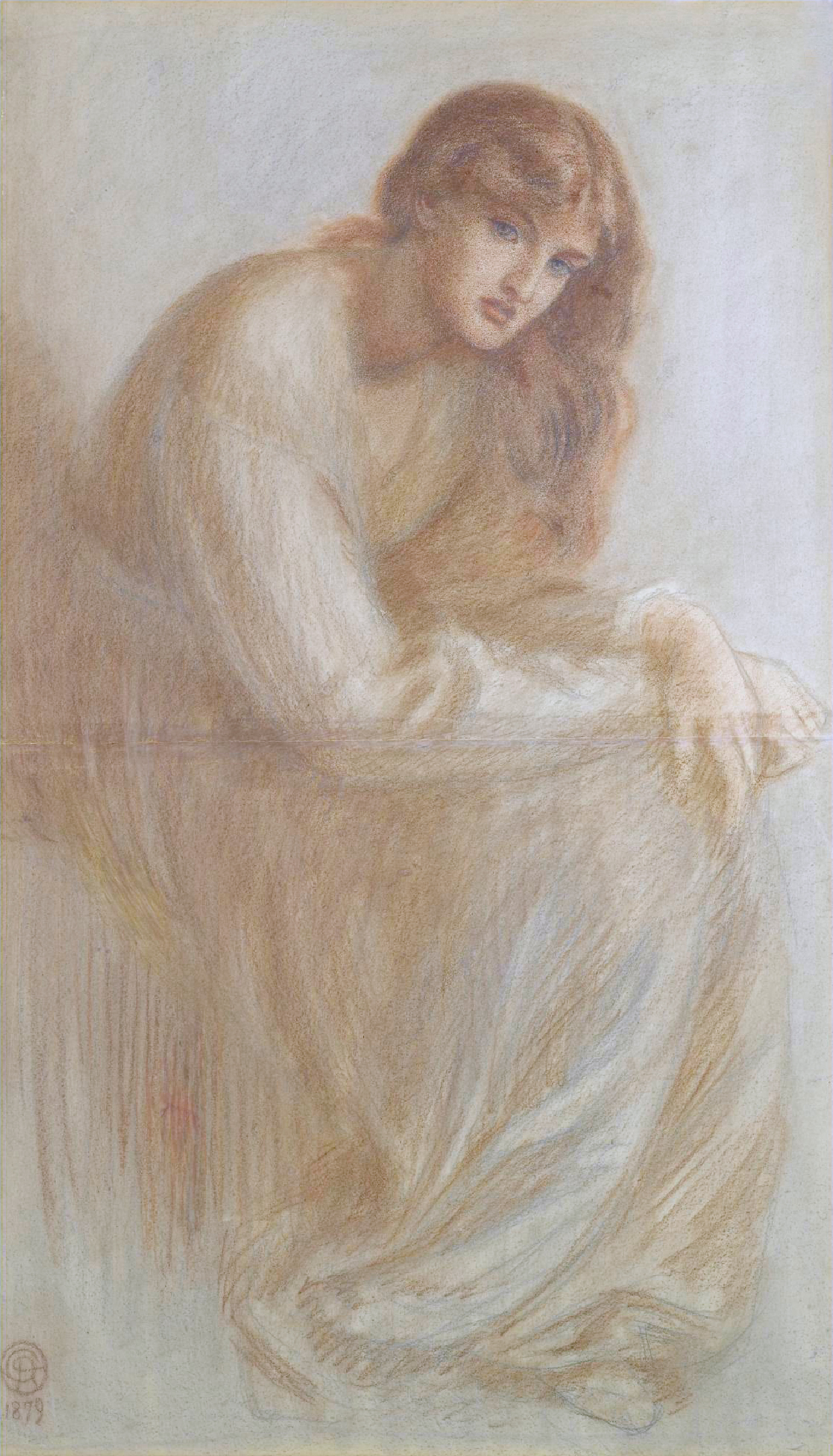
Alexa Wilding (1879)

=== Portraits etc ===
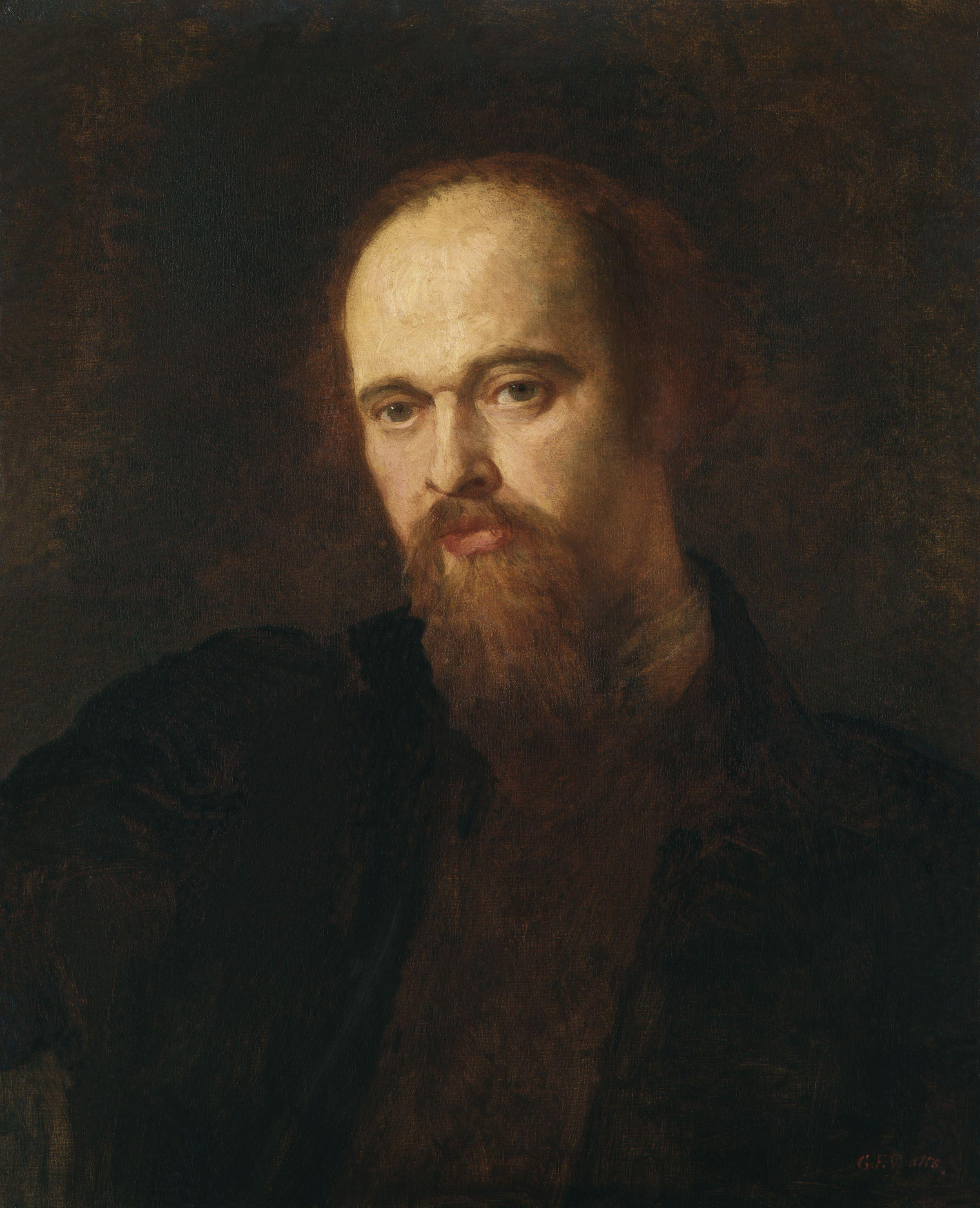
Portrait c. 1871, by George Frederic Watts

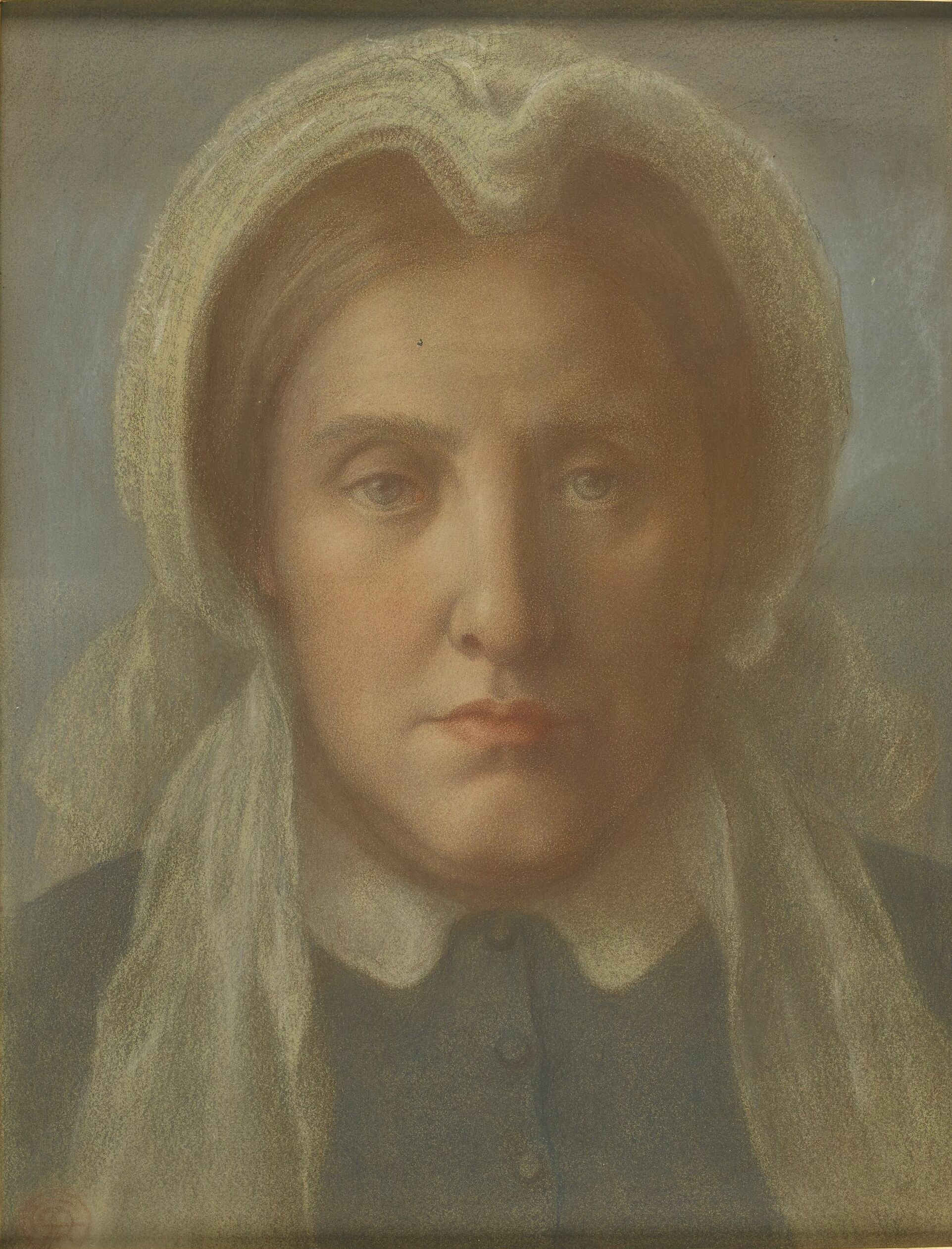
Portrait of Frances Gabriele Rossetti the Artist's Mother (1877)

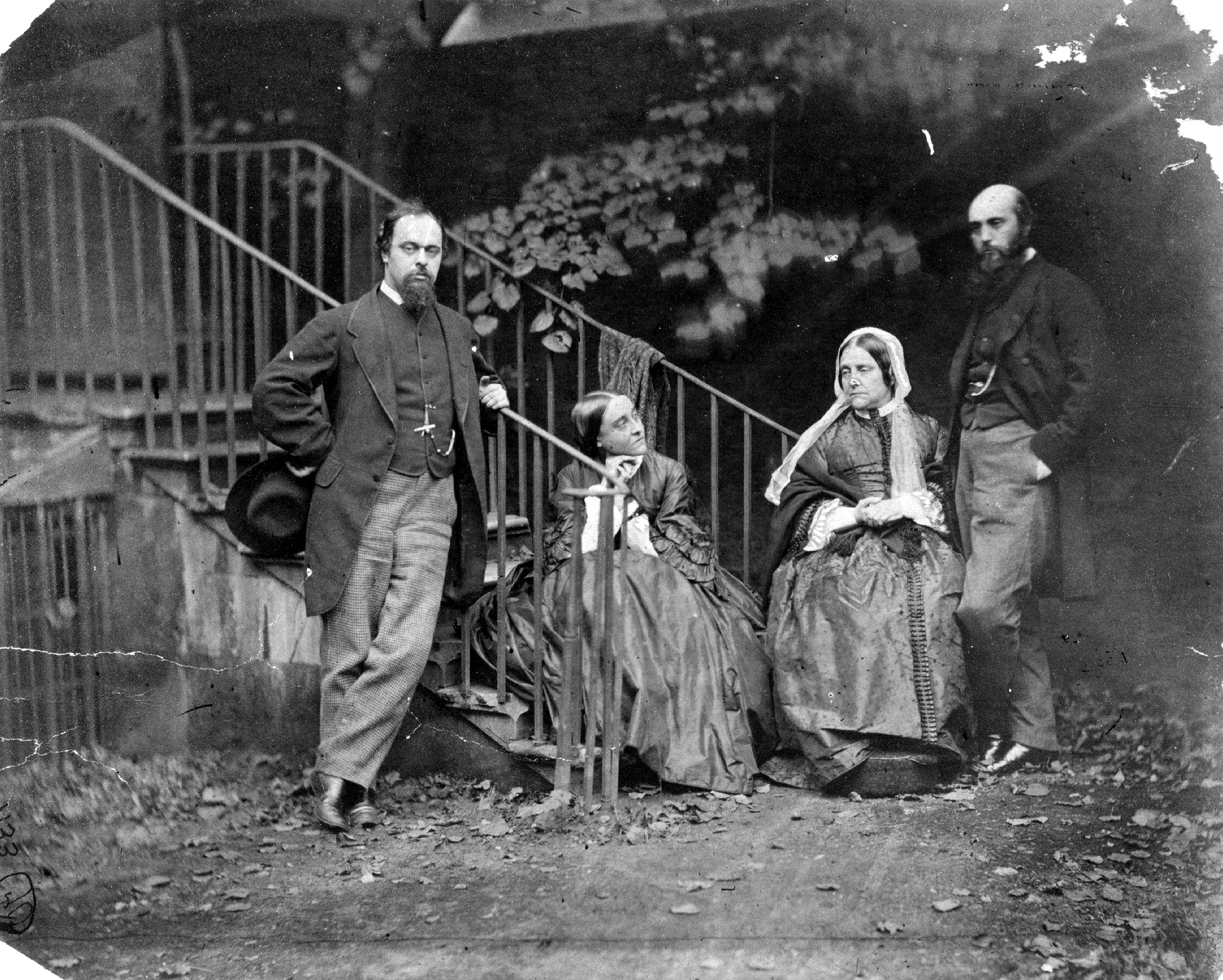
The Rossetti family in 1863

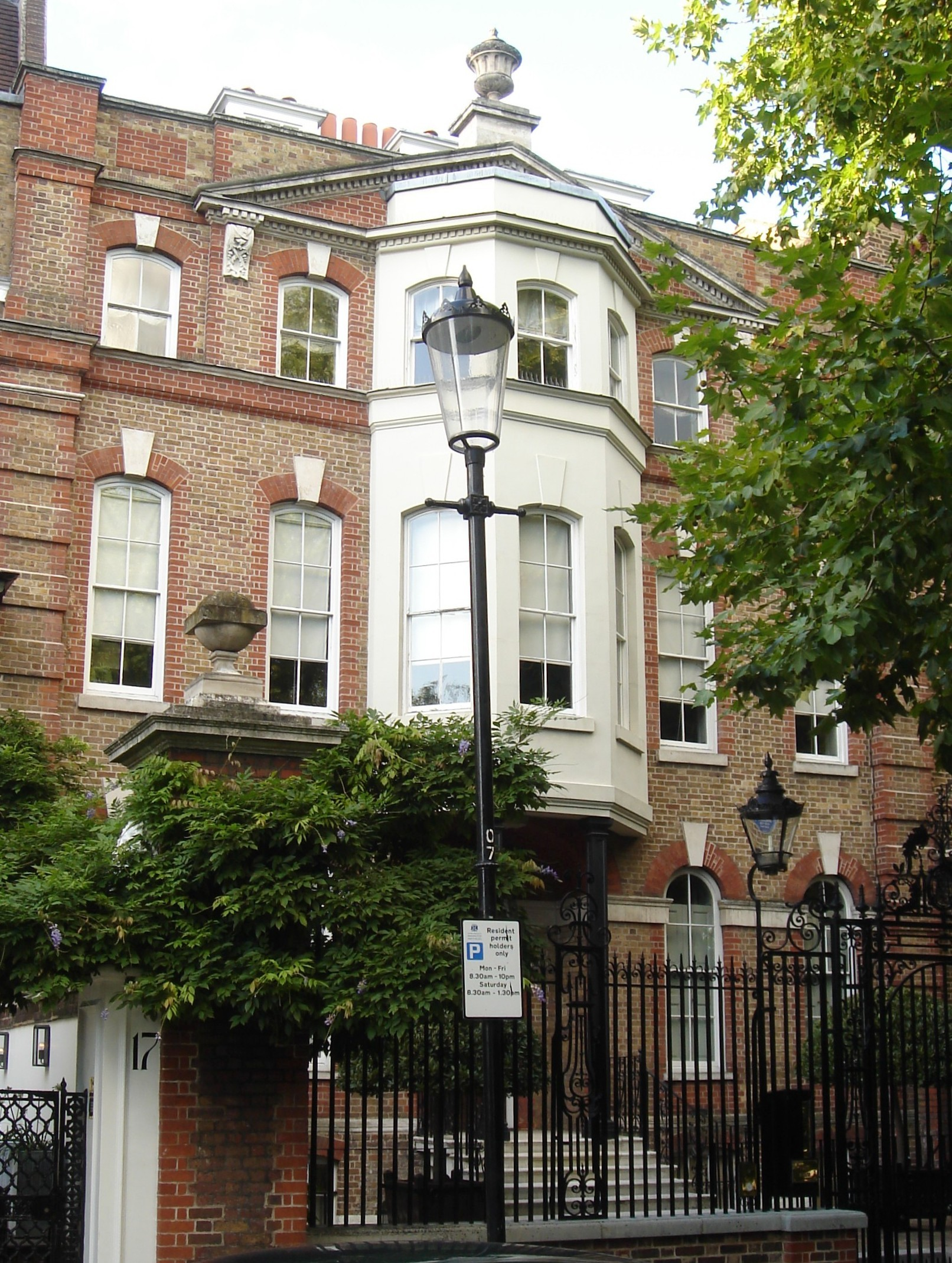
His home at 16 Cheyne Walk, London

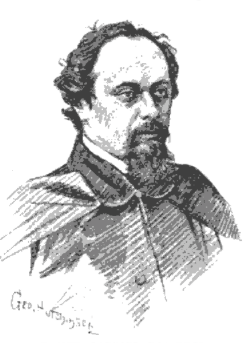
Dante Gabriel Rossetti by George Wylie Hutchinson

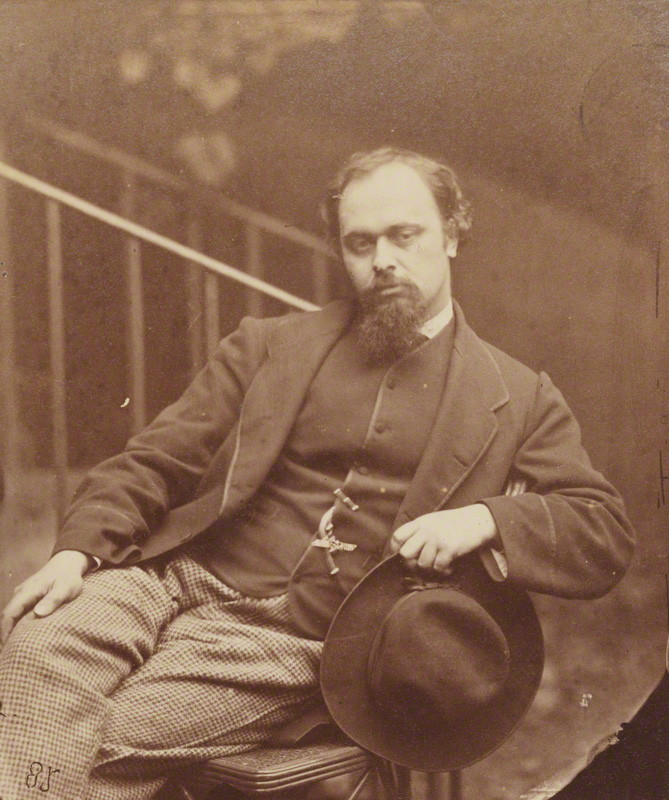
Albumen print of Dante Gabriel Rossetti by Charles Lutwidge Dodgson (Lewis Carroll; 1863)

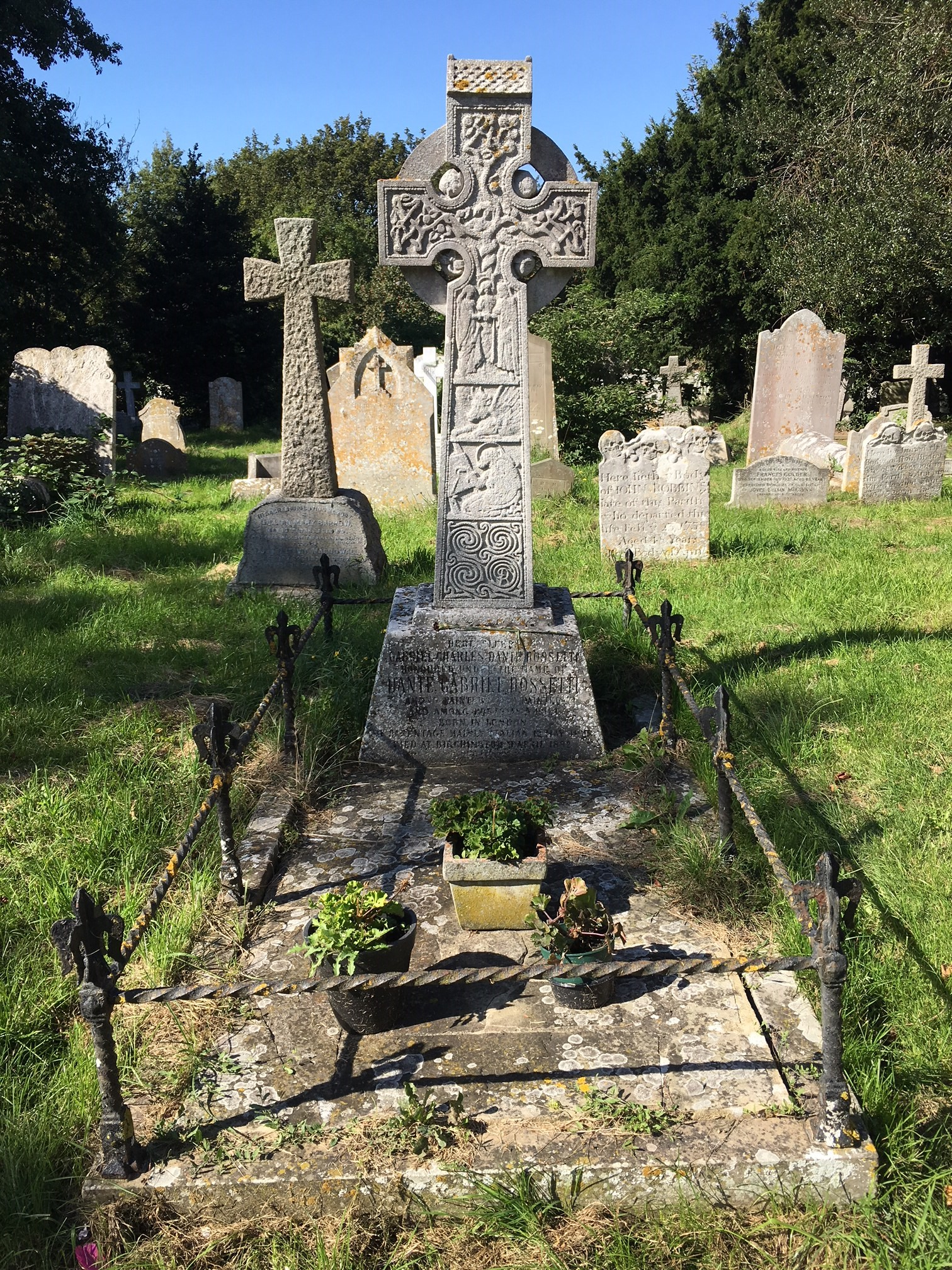
The grave of Dante Gabriel Rossetti in the churchyard of All Saints, Birchington-on-Sea

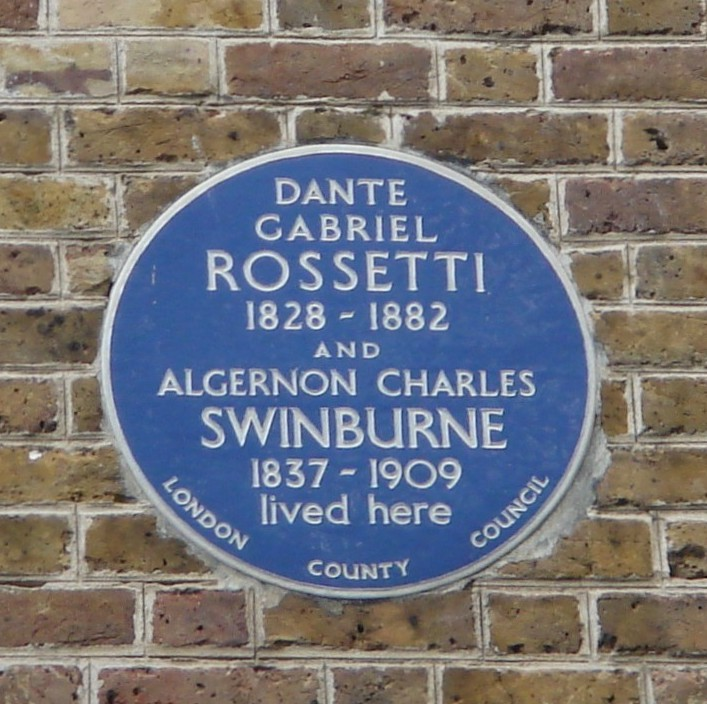
Blue plaque at 16 Cheyne Walk

=== Woodcut illustrations ===
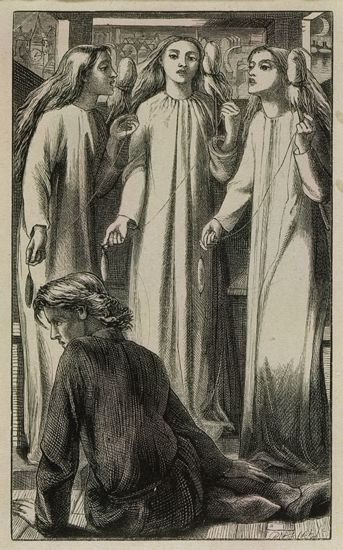
The Maids of Elfen-Mere, Rossetti's first published woodcut illustration (1855)

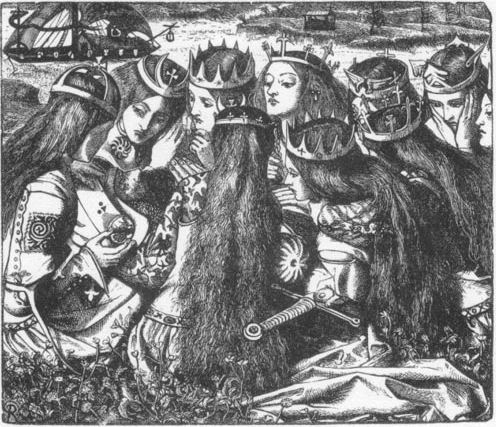
King Arthur and the Weeping Queens, one of two illustrations by Rossetti for Edward Moxon's illustrated edition of Tennyson's Poems (1857)

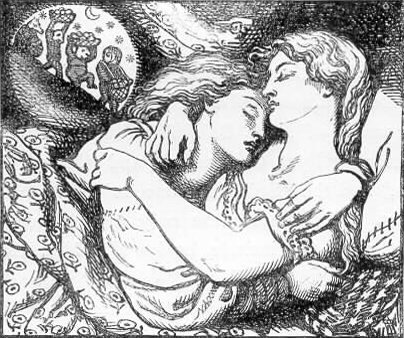
Golden Head by Golden Head, illustration for Christina Rossetti's Goblin Market and Other Poems (1862)

=== Decorative arts ===
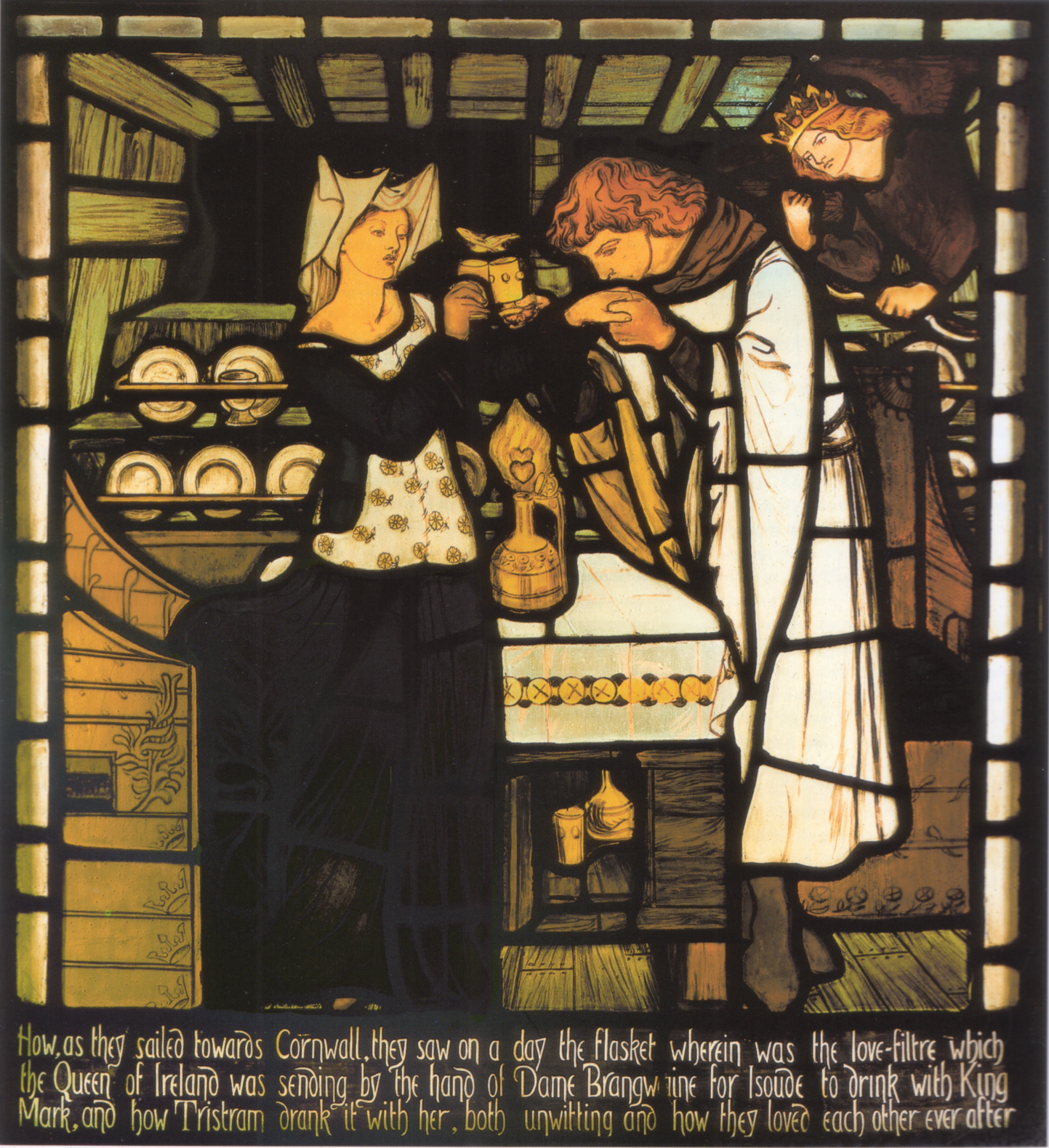
Sir Tristram and la Belle Isoude drink the potion, stained-glass panel by Morris, Marshall, Faulkner & Co., design by Rossetti (1862–63)

=== Caricatures and sketches ===
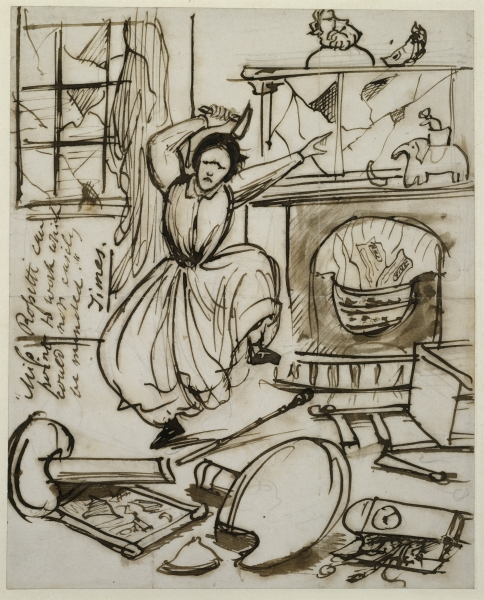
Christina Rossetti in a Tantrum (1862), depicting Christina Rossetti in the midst of an angry outburst after reading a review of her poetry in The Times

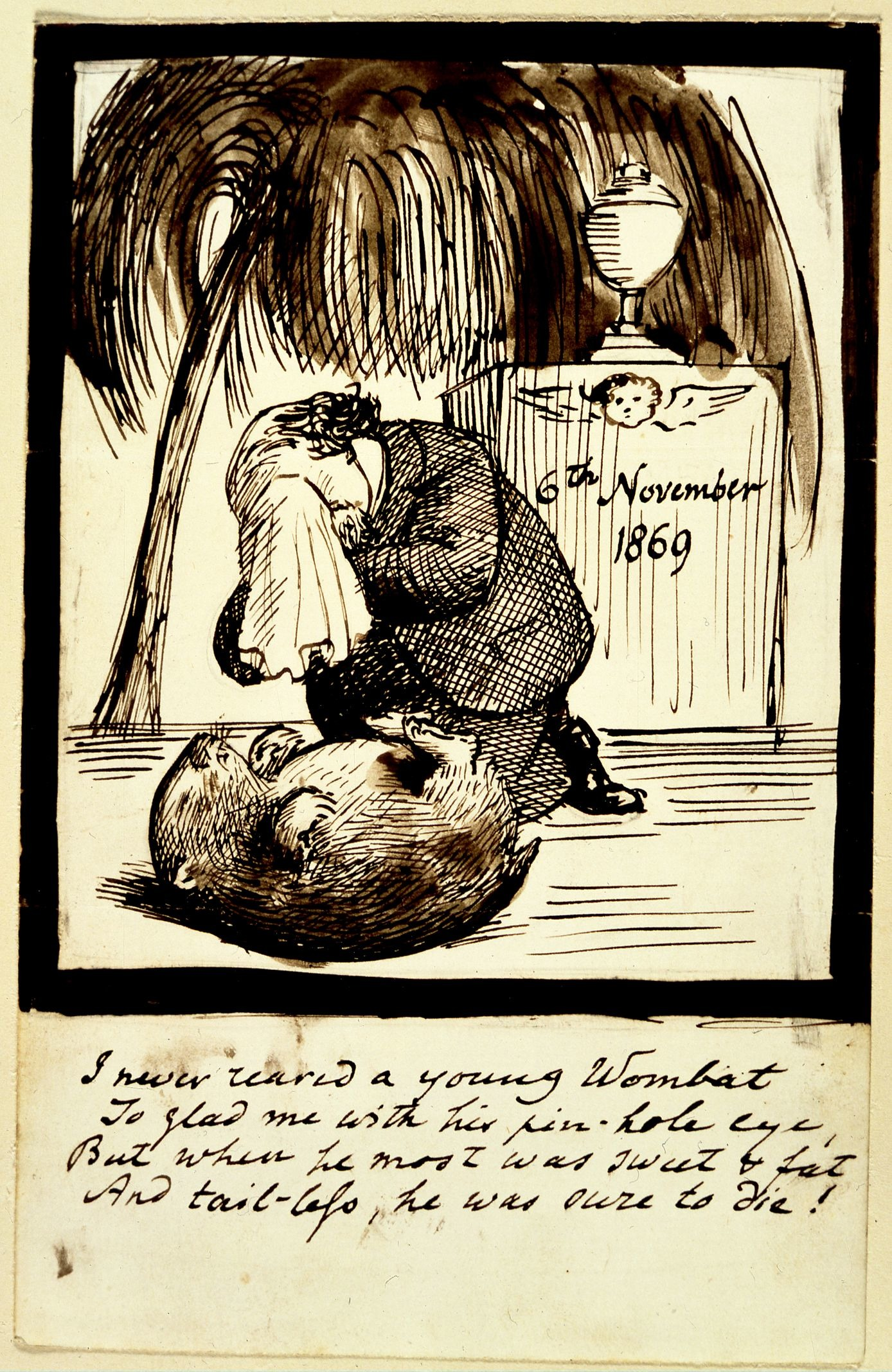
Death of a Wombat (1869), depicting Top

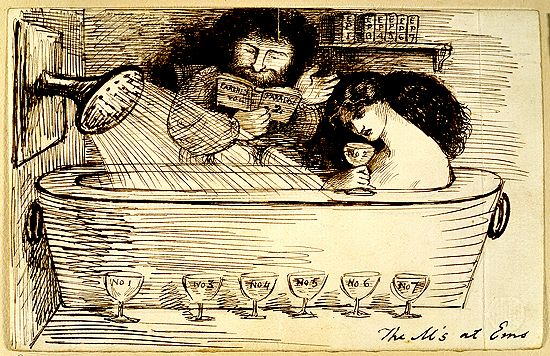
William Morris reading to Jane Morris while she takes the waters at Bad Ems (1869)

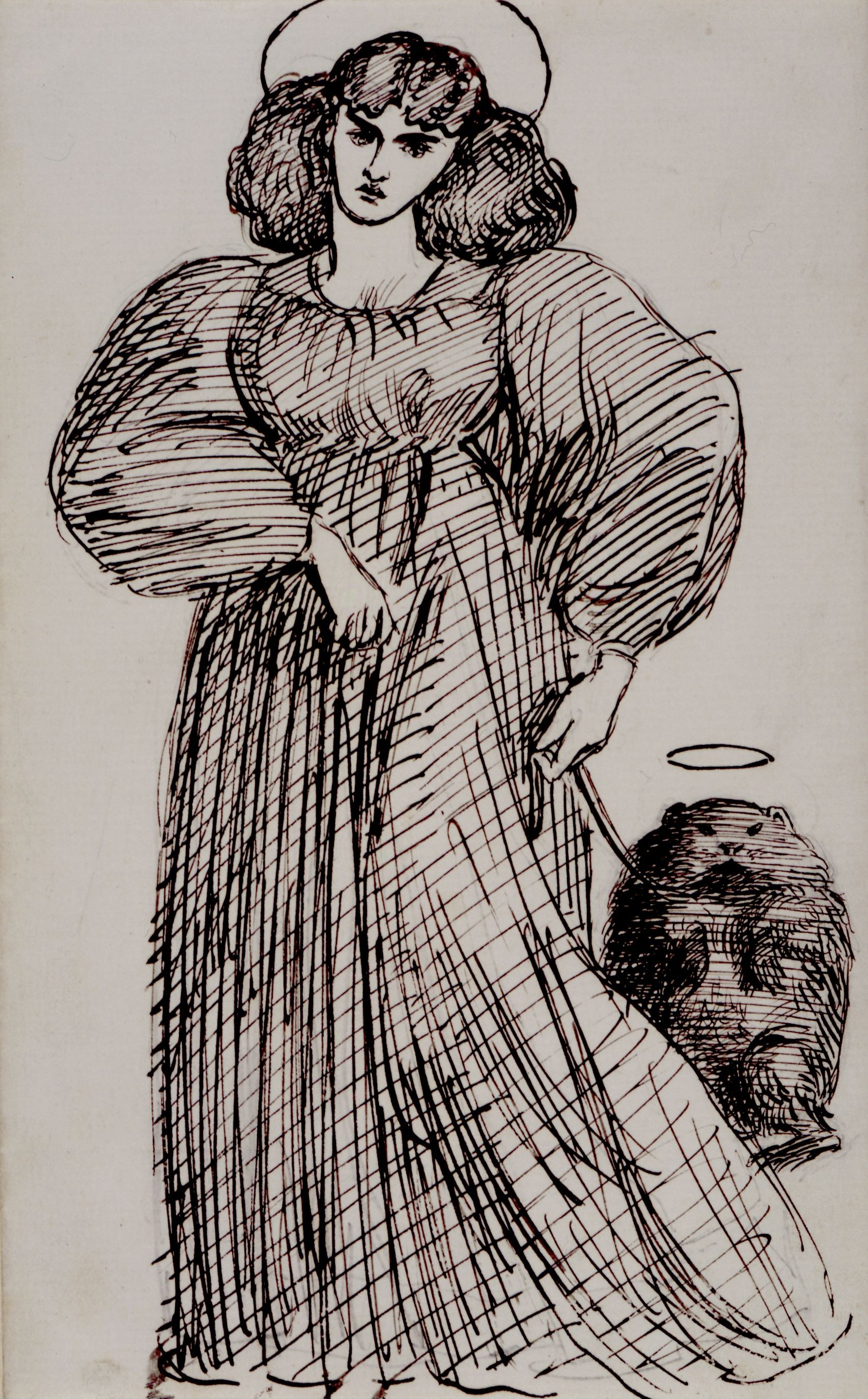
Mrs. Morris and the Wombat (1869)

== Written works ==
=== Books ===
- The Early Italian Poets (a translation), 1861; republished as Dante and His Circle, 1874
- Rossetti, Dante Gabriel (1870). Poems (1st ed.). London: F. S. Ellis. Details and facsimile online at Rossetti Archive.
- Poems revised and reissued as Poems. A New Edition, 1881
- Ballads and Sonnets, 1881
- The Collected Works of Dante Gabriel Rossetti, 2 volumes, 1886 (posthumous)
- Ballads and Narrative Poems, 1893 (posthumous)
- Sonnets and Lyrical Poems, 1894 (posthumous)
- The Works of Dante Gabriel Rossetti, 1911 (posthumous)
- Poems and Translations 1850–1870, Together with the Prose Story 'Hand and Soul', Oxford University Press, 1913

=== Double works ===
"Rossetti divided his attention between painting and poetry for the rest of his life" – Poetry Foundation

- Aspecta Medusa (October 1865 – 1868)
- Astarte Syriaca (for a Picture; 1877 January–February; 1875–1877)
- Beatrice, her Damozels, and Love (1865?)
- Beauty and the Bird (1855; 1858 June 25)
- The Blessed Damozel (1847–1870; 1871–1881)
- Bocca Baciata (1859–1860)
- Body's Beauty (1864–1869; 1866)
- The Bride's Prelude [1848–1870 (circa)]
- Cassandra (for a drawing; September 1869; 1860–1861, 1867, 1869)
- Dante's Dream on the Day of the Death of Beatrice: 9 June 1290 (1875 [?], 1856)
- Dante Alighieri. "Sestina. Of the Lady Pietra degli Scrovigni." (1848 [?], 1861, 1874)
- Dante at Verona [1848–1850; 1852 (circa)]
- The Day-Dream (for a picture; 1878–1880, 1880 September)
- Death of A Wombat (6 November 1869)
- Eden Bower [1863–1864 (circa) or 1869 (circa)]
- Fazio's Mistress (1863; 1873)
- Fiammetta [for a picture; 1878 (circa) 1878]
- "Found" (for a picture; 1854; 1881 February)
- Francesca Da Rimini. Dante (1855; 1862 September)
- Guido Cavalcanti. "Ballata. He reveals, in a Dialogue, his increasing love for Mandetta." (1861)
- Hand and Soul (1849)
- Hero's Lamp (1875)
- Introductory Sonnet ("A Sonnet is a moment's monument"; 1880)
- Joan of Arc [1879 (unfinished), 1863, 1882]
- La Bella Mano (for a picture; 1875)
- La Pia. Dante (1868–1880)
- Lisa ed Elviro (1843)
- Love's Greeting (1850, 1861, 1864)
- Mary's Girlhood [for a picture; 1848 (sonnet I), 1849 (sonnet II)]
- Mary Magdalene at the Door of Simon the Pharisee (for a drawing; 1853–1859; 1869)
- Michael Scott's Wooing (for a drawing; 1853, 1869–1871, 1875–1876)
- Mnemosyne (1880)
- Old and New Art [group of 3 poems; 1849 (text); 1857 (picture, circa)]
- On William Morris (1871 September)
- Pandora (for a picture; 1869; 1868–1871)
- Parody on "Uncle Ned" (1852)
- Parted Love! [1869 September – 1869 November (circa)]
- The Passover in the Holy Family (for a drawing; 1849–1856; 1869 September)
- Perlascura. Twelve Coins for One Queen (1878)
- The Portrait (1869)
- Proserpine (1872; 1871–1882)
- The Question (for a design; 1875, 1882)
- "Retro me, Sathana!" (1847, 1848)
- The Return of Tibullus to Delia (1853–1855, 1867)
- A Sea-Spell (for a Picture; 1870, 1877)
- The Seed of David (for a picture; 1864)
- Silence. For a Design (1870, 1877)
- Sister Helen [1851–1852; 1870 (circa)]
- Sorrentino (1843)
- Soul's Beauty (1866; 1864–1870)
- St. Agnes of Intercession (1850; 1860)
- Troy Town (1863–1864; 1869–1870)
- Venus Verticordia (for a picture; 1868 January 16; 1863–1869)
- William and Marie. A Ballad (1841)

== See also ==
- English art
- James Smetham
- List of paintings by Dante Gabriel Rossetti
- Rossetti and His Circle, 1922 book by Max Beerbohm

== Bibliography ==
- Ash, Russell (1995), Dante Gabriel Rossetti. London: Pavilion Books ISBN 978-1-85793-412-0; New York: Abrams ISBN 978-1-85793-950-7.
- Boos, Florence S. The Poetry of Dante G. Rossetti. Mouton, 1973.
- Broussine, Sylvie; Christopher Newall (2021). 'Rossetti's Portraits', Pallas Athene, ISBN 978-1843682097.
- Doughty, Oswald (1949), A Victorian Romantic: Dante Gabriel Rossetti. London: Frederick Muller.
- Drew, Rodger (2006), The Stream's Secret: The Symbolism of Dante Gabriel Rossetti. Cambridge: The Lutterworth Press, ISBN 978-0-7188-3057-1.
- Fredeman, William E. (1971). Prelude to the Last Decade: Dante Gabriel Rossetti in the summer of 1872. Manchester [Eng.]: The John Rylands Library.
- Fredeman, William E. (ed.) (2002–08), The Correspondence of Dante Gabriel Rossetti. 7 vols. Cambridge: Brewer.
- Hilton, Timothy (1970). The Pre-Raphaelites. London: Thames and Hudson, New York: H. N. Abrams. ISBN 0810904241.
- Lucas, F. L. (2013), Dante Gabriel Rossetti – an anthology (poems and translations, with introduction). Cambridge University Press ISBN 9781107639799
- Mancoff, Debra N. (2021). 'Dante Gabriel Rossetti: Portraits of Women (Victoria and Albert Museum)', Thames and Hudson Ltd, ISBN 978-0500480717
- Marsh, Jan (1999). Dante Gabriel Rossetti: Painter and Poet. London: Weidenfeld & Nicolson.
- Marsh, Jan (1996). The Pre-Raphaelites: Their Lives in Letters and Diaries. London: Collins & Brown.
- McGann, J. J. (2000). Dante Gabriel Rossetti and the Game that Must Be Lost. New Haven: Yale University Press.
- Parry, Linda (1996), ed., William Morris. New York: Abrams, ISBN 0-8109-4282-8.
- Pedrick, G. (1964). Life with Rossetti: or, No peacocks allowed. London:Macdonald. ISBN
- Roe, Dinah: The Rossettis in Wonderland. A Victorian Family History. London: Haus Publishing, 2011.
- Rossetti, D. G. "The House of Life from Project Gutenberg". The Online Books Page.
- Rossetti, D. G., & J. Marsh (2000). Collected Writings of Dante Gabriel Rossetti. Chicago: New Amsterdam Books.
- Rossetti, D. G., & W. W. Rossetti, ed. (1911), The Works of Dante Gabriel Rossetti. Ellis, London. (full text)
- Sharp, Frank C., and Jan Marsh (2012), The Collected Letters of Jane Morris, Boydell & Brewer, London.
- Simons, J. (2008). Rossetti's Wombat: Pre-Raphaelites and Australian animals in Victorian London. London: Middlesex University Press.
- Treuherz, Julian, Prettejohn, Elizabeth, and Becker, Edwin (2003). Dante Gabriel Rossetti. London: Thames & Hudson, ISBN 0-500-09316-4.
- Todd, Pamela (2001). Pre-Raphaelites at Home. New York: Watson-Giptill Publications, ISBN 0-8230-4285-5.
- Weintraub, Stanley (1978). Four Rossettis: A Victorian Biography. London: W. H. Allen. ISBN 978-0-491-01588-2
