= Desperate Romantics =

British television drama series

- Publicity still portraying (left to right) Samuel Barnett as John Everett Millais, Sam Crane as Fred Walters, Aidan Turner as Dante Gabriel Rossetti, Rafe Spall as William Holman Hunt.
- Genre: Costume drama
- Written by: Peter Bowker
- Directed by: Paul Gay; Diarmuid Lawrence
- Starring: Aidan Turner; Rafe Spall; Sam Crane; Samuel Barnett; Zoë Tapper; Amy Manson; Tom Hollander; Jennie Jacques
- Composer: Daniel Pemberton
- Country of origin: United Kingdom
- Original language: English
- No. of series: 1
- No. of episodes: 6

Production
- Executive producer: Hilary Salmon
- Producer: Ben Evans
- Running time: 60 minutes

Original release
- Network: BBC Two; BBC HD
- Release: 21 July – 25 August 2009

Desperate Romantics is a six-part television drama serial about the Pre-Raphaelite Brotherhood, first broadcast on BBC Two between 21 July and 25 August 2009.

The series somewhat fictionalised the lives and events depicted. Though heavily trailed, the series received mixed reviews and dwindling audiences.

== Overview ==
The series was inspired by and takes its title from Franny Moyle's factual book about the Pre-Raphaelite Brotherhood, Desperate Romantics: The Private Lives of the Pre-Raphaelites.

Moyle, a former commissioning editor for the arts at the BBC, approached writer Peter Bowker with the book, believing it could form the basis of an interesting television drama. Although Bowker had a self-confessed "horror of dramatised art biography", he felt that Moyle's book offered something different, viewing the Brotherhood's art largely through the filter of their tangled love lives.

Discussing the series' billing as "Entourage with easels", Moyle said: "I didn't pitch it as 'Entourage with easels' ... I pitched it as a big emotional saga, a bit like The Forsyte Saga. Having said that, I think it was a useful snapshot – a way of getting a handle on the drama." The series had also been billed by the BBC as "marrying the Pre-Raphaelite Brotherhood to the values of Desperate Housewives."

Desperate Romantics was not the first time the lives of the Pre-Raphaelite Brotherhood had been dramatised for television. In 1967 Ken Russell had directed Dante's Inferno, and in 1975 there was The Love School – a six-part serial first broadcast in 1975. Whereas Bowker's drama about the PRB was an adaptation of Franny Moyles' book, The Love School (scripted by John Hale, Ray Lawler, Robin Chapman and John Prebble) was adapted into a novel published by Macmillan in 1975. The new dramatisation was greatly influenced by the earlier series.

== Cast ==
- Aidan Turner as Dante Gabriel Rossetti
- Rafe Spall as William Holman Hunt
- Samuel Barnett as John Everett Millais
- Sam Crane as Fred Walters
- Zoë Tapper as Effie Gray
- Amy Manson as Lizzie Siddal
- Jennie Jacques as Annie Miller
- Tom Hollander as John Ruskin
- Phil Davis as Frank Stone
- Mark Heap as Charles Dickens
- Rebecca Davies as Fanny Cornforth
- Dyfrig Morris as William Morris
- Peter Sandys-Clarke as Edward Burne-Jones
- Natalie Thomas as Jane Burden
- Poppy Lee Friar as Rose La Touche
- Samuel West as Lord Rosterley

== Episodes ==
| No. | Title | Directed by | Written by | Original release date | UK viewers (millions) |
|---|---|---|---|---|---|
| 1 | "Episode 1" | Paul Gay | Peter Bowker | 21 July 2009 | 2.61 |
Fred Walters introduces the Pre-Raphaelite Brotherhood, Dante Gabriel Rossetti, John Everett Millais and William Holman Hunt, to their perfect model: hat shop girl Lizzie Siddal. Fred persuades Lizzie's parents to allow her to model for the Brotherhood, using his mother to vouch for them. After being rejected by the Royal Academy, the Brotherhood decide to stage an exhibition of their own, and invite influential art critic John Ruskin to attend. Ruskin, who has previously rejected their work, is finally persuaded of their promise, and his encouragement silences their other critics, including the establishment figures who run the Academy.
| 2 | "Episode 2" | Paul Gay | Peter Bowker | 28 July 2009 | 2.13 |
Having caught the attention of John Ruskin, the Brotherhood attempt to persuade him to buy their work. Millais, preoccupied by thoughts of Ruskin's wife Effie, fails to prevent Lizzie falling unconscious with pneumonia while posing for him as Ophelia, leaving Rossetti bereft at the prospect of losing the woman he loves. When she recovers, her father dashes Millais' hopes of finishing his masterpiece by refusing to allow her to model for the Brotherhood again. On payment of compensation, he relents. The resultant painting is a triumph for the Brotherhood.
| 3 | "Episode 3" | Paul Gay | Peter Bowker | 4 August 2009 | 2.15 |
The Brotherhood have secured John Ruskin's patronage, but their personal lives are still rife with problems. Fred longs uselessly for Lizzie, who remains besotted with an evasive and lazy Rossetti, once again struggling to apply himself to creating the elusive "masterpiece". Hunt continues to find a conflict between his religion and his desire. Meanwhile, under Ruskin's instruction, Millais begins The Order of Release, an evocative painting of Effie; however, he quickly realises that there may be another agenda involved. Spurred on by Rossetti and Hunt, he decides to pursue a sexual relationship with Ruskin's still virginal wife. Annie Miller warns Millais's friends that Ruskin may be planning to set him up as co-respondent in a divorce case, and the tables are turned when Effie obtains an annulment of her marriage on the grounds of non-consummation. She quickly persuades Millais to marry her in order to preserve her good name.
| 4 | "Episode 4" | Diarmuid Lawrence | Peter Bowker | 11 August 2009 | 1.92 |
With Hunt away in the Holy Land, Fred's promise to take care of Annie takes an unexpected turn when she seduces him. Upon his return, an oblivious Hunt, impressed by Annie's improved deportment and command of etiquette, asks her to marry him. However, he soon realizes that this new stage in their relationship has made him unable to become physically aroused by her. Feeling that their marriage has become impossible, he rejects Annie and, changing his mind again too late, loses her to rakish aristocrat Lord Rosterley. Meanwhile, the prospect of becoming Ruskin's new protégé prompts an excited Rossetti to propose to Lizzie, but he is disappointed and jealous when Ruskin proves more interested in her potential as an artist than Rossetti's and he is obliged to take up a teaching post.
| 5 | "Episode 5" | Diarmuid Lawrence | Peter Bowker | 18 August 2009 | 1.96 |
Ruskin is displeased by Rossetti and Lizzie's partying and debauchery, funded by his patronage, and orders them to focus on their work, instructing Lizzie to paint each day at his house and Rossetti to complete a church mural. A restless Rossetti embarks on an affair with prostitute Fanny Cornforth, who proves a sensual source of inspiration for his art. Lizzie falls ill as a result of her heartbreak over Rossetti's behaviour and her increasing use of laudanum; Rossetti, under the impression that she is dying, promises they will marry when she recovers. Rossetti invites his students and admirers William Morris and Edward Burne-Jones to join the Brotherhood after they complete the mural for him, just as Ruskin arrives to inspect it. Rossetti and Lizzie marry, and Morris introduces the waitress who caught Rossetti's eye on the morning of the wedding as his sweetheart, Jane Burden.
| 6 | "Episode 6" | Diarmuid Lawrence | Peter Bowker | 25 August 2009 | 1.76 |
Following her marriage to Rossetti, Lizzie is distraught to discover that Ruskin has lost interest in her as an artist and is now tutoring Rose la Touche instead. Rossetti tries to change Ruskin's mind and warns him that his relationship with the underage Rose may damage his reputation. Millais suggests that the Brotherhood should all move into his new house as an artists' colony. Rossetti takes Morris and Burne-Jones to Cremorne Gardens, where he sees Annie, who has returned to prostitution. He pleads with her to return to Hunt, but when she does so, it is to blackmail Hunt by threatening to publish his sexually explicit love letters. Fred warns Lizzie about Rossetti's attraction to Jane Burden, but she throws him out of the house after he tries to seduce her. After a public argument with Lizzie, Rossetti gets drunk with the Brotherhood. When he takes Fred home with him, intending to make his peace with her, he finds Lizzie dead, having deliberately overdosed on laudanum. He and Fred debate whether or not to destroy Lizzie's suicide note. Fred takes it, but cannot bring himself to tell her family. Rossetti implores Jane to marry Morris and paints Beata Beatrix as a memorial to Lizzie. At her funeral Rossetti throws his manuscript poems into her grave. When Fred, Morris and Burne-Jones praise the buried poems, he decides to dig them up again. Fred is disgusted with Rossetti and finally rejects him.

== Works featured ==
Episode 1:

- Christ in the House of His Parents (1849–1850) by John Everett Millais
- Ecce Ancilla Domini! (1850) by Dante Gabriel Rossetti
- Valentine Rescuing Sylvia from Proteus (1851) by William Holman Hunt
- The Hireling Shepherd (1851) by William Holman Hunt

Episode 2:

- Ophelia (1851–1852) by John Everett Millais
- The Awakening Conscience (1853) by William Holman Hunt
- Found (1854–1881) by Dante Gabriel Rossetti

Episode 3:

- The Order of Release, 1746 (1854) by John Everett Millais
- The Light of the World (1853–1854) by William Holman Hunt

Episode 4:

- The Scapegoat (1856) by William Holman Hunt
- Dante's Dream at the Time of the Death of Beatrice (1871) by Dante Gabriel Rossetti
- Study of a Female Nude (1878?) by Dante Gabriel Rossetti
- The Lady of Shalott (1853) by Elizabeth Siddal
- Lovers Listening to Music (1854) by Elizabeth Siddal
- Autumn Leaves (1856) by John Everett Millais
- The Blind Girl (1856) by John Everett Millais
- The Ladies' Lament (1856) by Elizabeth Siddal
- The Rowing Boat (undated, c. 1850–1860) by Elizabeth Siddal
- Bubbles (1886) by John Everett Millais

Episode 5:

- Bocca Baciata (1859) by Dante Gabriel Rossetti
- The Shadow of Death (1872) by William Holman Hunt
- Oxford Union murals (1857–1859) by Dante Gabriel Rossetti, William Morris, Edward Burne-Jones et al.

Episode 6:

- Beata Beatrix (1872) by Dante Gabriel Rossetti
- Study of Guinevere for Sir Launcelot in the Queen's Chamber (1857) by Dante Gabriel Rossetti

Other notable images include:

- Ecce Ancilla Domini (1849–1850) by Dante Gabriel Rossetti
- Dante's Vision of Rachel and Leah (1855) by Dante Gabriel Rossetti
- The Holy Family (undated) by Elizabeth Siddal

The poem Rossetti writes for Lizzie as she recuperates from her ordeal in Millais' bath tub is "Sudden Light" (c. 1853–1854, published 1863). The final stanza, which Rossetti reads aloud to Lizzie before they first have sex, appears in the 1870 edition of Rossetti's Collected Poems. Also featured are "Newborn Death" and "The Kiss". The verses read at Lizzie's funeral by her sister are from Lizzie's own poem "Dead Love" (c. 1859).

== Historical accuracy ==
One of the disclaimer slides that appear at the beginning of each episode.

Each episode begins with the disclaimer: "In the mid-19th century, a group of young men challenged the art establishment of the day. The Pre-Raphaelite Brotherhood were inspired by the real world about them, yet took imaginative licence in their art. This story, based on their lives and loves, follows in that inventive spirit." In an interview for The Independent, Moyle noted that Bowker's adaptation of her source material required a "chronological sleight of hand" turning "the story that plays out in the book over 12 years into something that feels as if it's taking place over a couple of years – to keep up the pace, to make it feel modern."

- Fred Walters is a composite character based on Frederic George Stephens, William Michael Rossetti and Walter Deverell, and functions as both narrator and audience surrogate. It was Deverell who discovered Lizzie, and Stephens, in his capacity as an art critic, who acted as the Brotherhood's publicist.
- Dickens' criticism of Christ in the House of His Parents is an extract from his original review, titled "Old Lamps for New Ones", that featured in the 15 June 1850 edition of Household Words.
- Lizzie Siddal's father did indeed claim to be descended from aristocracy, but the family was larger than depicted in the series. She had three sisters and a younger brother. Her father in fact died in 1859, before her marriage to Rossetti.
- Annie Miller was not working as a prostitute when Hunt first asked her to pose for him, but as a barmaid in Charing Cross Road at the public house frequented by the Brotherhood (though the series is somewhat vague at her introduction as to whether she is a barmaid with other interests, or a prostitute who happens to tend bar). Annie was not the model for The Hireling Shepherd: a farm worker, Emma Watkins, was.
- When Effie discovers a collection of erotic drawings by J. M. W. Turner amongst Ruskin's papers he claims that he is "compelled to destroy them" to protect Turner's posthumous reputation. Biographies of both Turner and Ruskin claimed that Ruskin had burned them in 1858, but this was disproved in 2005 when the sketches were discovered in a neglected archive.
- Although Lizzie Siddal did catch pneumonia during the painting of Millais' Ophelia, the Brotherhood were not forced to bribe her father to allow her to continue modelling; instead, Siddal's father wrote to Millais asking him to pay a doctor's bill to the sum of £50. According to his son, Millais settled for a lower sum.
- Millais painted The Order of Release at the Ruskins' country home in Scotland and not at their townhouse in London.
- The reason behind Ruskin's inability – or unwillingness – to consummate his marriage to Effie remains the subject of debate amongst his biographers. In 1854, Effie wrote to her father: "He alleged various reasons, hatred to children, religious motives, a desire to preserve my beauty, and, finally this last year he told me his true reason [...] that he had imagined women were quite different to what he saw I was, and that the reason he did not make me his Wife [sic] was because he was disgusted with my person the first evening." Ruskin's only word on the matter was in a statement to his lawyer during annulment proceedings: "It may be thought strange that I could abstain from a woman who to most people was so attractive. But though her face was beautiful, her person was not formed to excite passion. On the contrary, there were certain circumstances in her person that completely checked it." It has been speculated that Ruskin's unfamiliarity with the realities of the female body was the reason he felt unable to have sex with her, and that it was either the sight of Effie's pubic hair or menstrual blood that informed his disgust. His relationship with Rose la Touche has also led to claims that he was a paedophile, having met her at the age of 10 and stating that he had loved her since their first meeting. This claim is often backed up by letters he sent to illustrator Kate Greenaway – asking her to draw children naked. However, he did not approach Rose as a potential suitor until she was 17.
- Key members and associates of the Brotherhood, such as Ford Madox Brown, and Rossetti's brother William and sister Christina, are conspicuous by their absence.
- The character of "Lord Rosterley" to whom Annie becomes engaged is based on Thomas Heron Jones, 7th Viscount Ranelagh, with whom she was involved.
- Contrary to the series' depiction, Rossetti had already met Burne-Jones and Morris before they became his students. While they were students at the University of Oxford, they recruited Rossetti to contribute to their Oxford and Cambridge Magazine which Morris founded in 1856 to promote their ideas.
- Rossetti's church mural is in fact his composition Sir Lancelot's Vision of the Grail for the Oxford Union building, which he worked on in collaboration with Morris and Burne-Jones. Rossetti did paint an altarpiece for Llandaff Cathedral, The Seed of David (1858–1859).
- The series portrays Jane Burden as a woman with an Oxfordshire accent working as a waitress in London, meeting Rossetti by chance after having already become Morris' "sweetheart". In fact Jane Burden was first noticed in her home town by Rossetti and Burne-Jones when they were working on the Oxford murals. She was visiting an Oxford theatre with her sister. They asked her to model for them, and she met Morris as a result. Morris and Jane were married in 1859, three years before Lizzie's death.
- Lizzie died from a laudanum overdose in 1862, having grown severely depressed after giving birth to a stillborn daughter. Her death was ruled accidental by the coroner, although it has been claimed she did leave a suicide note that Ford Madox Brown suggested Rossetti burn to avoid any scandal. Rossetti did not have the poems he had buried with Lizzie exhumed until 1869, when he and his agent, Charles Augustus Howell, applied to the then Home Secretary for permission. As depicted in the serial, the manuscript was retrieved in the dead of night to avoid a scandal; Rossetti, however, was not present.
- Millais shows Rossetti a sketch for Bubbles as a forthcoming work. The painting was based on Millais' grandson William Milbourne James, who was not born until 1881, and was exhibited in 1886 when the grandson was five years old.

== Reception ==
When Desperate Romantics was first shown on BBC Two it attracted 2.61 million viewers. The first episode received mixed reviews; Tom Sutcliffe in The Independent described the series as "an off-day" for writer Peter Bowker, adding: "It was never quite recklessly anachronistic enough to suggest a defence of pre-determination for those moments in the script that seemed more like a spoof of an artistic biopic than a genuine attempt to rise above its limitations." Serena Davies wrote in The Daily Telegraph that the episode: "sadly didn't go far enough in conveying to the viewers how much the Pre-Raphaelites' art contrasted with what had gone before it." Caitlin Moran, reviewing the episode for The Times, described it as "so bone-deep cheesy that it appears to have been written with Primula, on Kraft Cheese Slices, and shot on location in Cheddar."

The Guardian review described the first episode as: "a rollicking gambol through a fictionalised Victorian London with a narrative as contemptuous of historical reverence as its rambunctious subjects were." Andrea Mullaney, writing for The Scotsman, also considered it: "a rollicking romp ... it's rather good fun", but cautioned: "historical purists will have to clench their thighs as it plays fast and loose with accuracy – much like the Pre-Raphaelite Brotherhood themselves, for all their vaunted insistence on painting the truth of nature."

The series has been rebroadcast for instance on BBC4 commencing 14 February 2022
