= Dante's Inferno (1967 film) =

Television film by Ken Russell

- Judith Paris as Lizzie Siddal and Oliver Reed as Rossetti.
- Genre: Costume drama
- Written by: Austin Frazer
- Directed by: Ken Russell
- Starring: Oliver Reed; Judith Paris; Andrew Faulds; Iza Teller; Christopher Logue
- Country of origin: United Kingdom
- Original language: English
- No. of episodes: 1

Production
- Producer: Ken Russell
- Running time: 90 minutes

Original release
- Network: BBC1
- Release: 22 December 1967

Dante's Inferno: The Private Life of Dante Gabriel Rossetti, Poet and Painter is a 1967 British 35 mm docudrama film directed by Ken Russell and first screened on BBC1 on 22 December 1967 as part of Omnibus. It quickly became a staple in cinemas in retrospectives of Russell's work.

Using nonlinear narrative technique, it tells of the relationship between the 19th-century artist and poet Dante Gabriel Rossetti (Oliver Reed) and his model, Elizabeth Siddal.

== Plot ==
The exhumation of Lizzie Siddal's desiccated body is seen, followed by a shot of Rossetti dancing among the flames of a bonfire of paintings by Reynolds and Gainsborough. A voice-over informs us that Rossetti is a founder of a revolutionary group of artists called the Pre-Raphaelite Brotherhood. The figure of the young Lizzie dressed as Joan of Arc appears above the flames. Lizzie is seen modelling for Millais's Ophelia and for a painting of Joan by Rossetti. The voice-over states that she eats little and often throws it up. She and Rossetti spend several years together while he paints and draws her but she spurns his sexual advances, even slashing him with a needle when he presses himself on her. Rossetti turns to the more accommodating Fanny Cornforth.

Lizzie is introduced to laudanum by Emma Brown to alleviate her stomach pain. She is advised by Christina Rossetti that Dante Gabriel needs a patron. Christina's voice-over speaks her poem In an Artist's Studio, about Lizzie. She tells Lizzie she looks ill. Rossetti and Christina visit William Holman Hunt, who is painting The Light of the World. Hunt asks Rossetti to look after his girlfriend Annie Miller while he is away in the Holy Land painting The Scapegoat but Rossetti has an affair with her and Hunt spurns her on his return. John Ruskin visits Rossetti's studio and shows an interest in Lizzie's art.

Rossetti meets Edward Burne-Jones and William Morris in Oxford and encounters the beautiful Jane Burden. They paint the Oxford Union murals. Jane marries Morris and Rossetti marries Lizzie. Lizzie becomes increasingly hysterical due to her laudanum use and Rossetti's philandering. She dies from an overdose. Rossetti buries his unpublished poems with her. Some years later, Charles Augustus Howell persuades him to dig the poems up but Rossetti is haunted by the image of the dead Lizzie and becomes addicted to chloral. Fanny Cornforth rescues him from a suicide attempt but Rossetti is now increasingly obsessed with Morris' wife Jane. He sleeps with her when Morris is away in Iceland but she remains distant. Isolated, with only the loyal Fanny to care for him, Rossetti sinks further into addiction.

== Cast ==
- Oliver Reed as Dante Gabriel Rossetti
- Judith Paris as Elizabeth Siddal
- Andrew Faulds as William Morris
- Iza Teller as Christina Rossetti
- Christopher Logue as Algernon Swinburne
- Gala Mitchell as Jane Morris
- Pat Ashton as Fanny Cornforth
- Clive Goodwin as John Ruskin
- David Jones as Charles Augustus Howell
- Norman Dewhurst as Edward Burne-Jones
- Tony Gray as William Michael Rossetti
- Douglas Gray as William Holman Hunt
- Derek Boshier as John Everett Millais
- Caroline Coon as Annie Miller
- Janet Deuters as Emma Brown
- Austin Frazer, the narrator.

== Inception ==
Russell had made an earlier film for television about the Pre-Raphaelites called Old Battersea House (1961), the success of which had drawn attention to the then-unfashionable art. Russell's original intention was to make a film showing the lives and works of the three main Pre-Raphaelite painters – Rossetti, Millais and Holman Hunt — but the arrival of a script into Russell's office at the BBC by Austin Frazer, solely about Rossetti, prompted Russell's change of plan. He thought that a story about a man who exhumes his dead wife and then is haunted by the deed was highly dramatic and marketable. Russell cast many of his friends and used amateur actors, including the pop artist Derek Boshier as Millais and the poet Christopher Logue as Swinburne." Much of the location shooting was done in the Lake District.

== Reception ==
Dante's Inferno's visual style is taken mostly from the Pre-Raphaelite paintings themselves, many of which, such as Millais' Ophelia are filmed in the actual locations where the paintings were created. Russell also uses imagery inspired by silent comedy and expressionist horror films.

Dante's Inferno has been described as "bit of a mess" despite moments of "inspired lunacy". Russell's biographer Joseph Lanza takes the view that its moody black-and-white photography makes the locations in the English Lake District seem like Dracula's Transylvania. Joseph A. Gomez argues that its chaotic appearance hides a sophisticated structure,

Perhaps on first viewing, the film may appear wildly episodic, strangely disorienting, self-indulgent, and extreme to the point of serious distortion. Yet with repeated viewings and research into Rossetti's life, the viewer soon realizes that Russell, like Hamlet, is but mad north-northwest. When the wind is southerly, he, too. knows a hawk from a handsaw...Russell concentrates on what he sees as the central conflict of Rossetti's life – the discrepancy between his ideals of truth, chivalry, and beauty which form the basis of his exalted vision of womanhood and what simply might be called his highly sexed nature. This emphasis, in turn, reveals Rossetti's neurotic characteristics of repetitive, obsessional thoughts and feelings and further assists to justify the film's structure since the content, to some degree, dictates the form.
