= The Love School =

1975 British television drama series

- Holman Hunt caresses Annie Miller while painting The Light of the World
- Created by: John Hale; Ray Lawler; Robin Chapman; John Prebble
- Developed by: BBC Television
- Starring: Ben Kingsley; Peter Egan
- Country of origin: United Kingdom
- No. of episodes: 6

Production
- Producers: Piers Haggard; John Glenister; Robert Knights
- Running time: 75 minutes

Original release
- Network: BBC2
- Release: 22 January – 26 February 1975

The Love School (broadcast in the U.S. as The Brotherhood) is a BBC television drama series originally broadcast in 1975 about the Pre-Raphaelite Brotherhood, written by John Hale, Ray Lawler, Robin Chapman and John Prebble. It was directed by Piers Haggard, John Glenister and Robert Knights. It was shown during January and February 1975. It includes six episodes, each episode is 75 minutes in length.

The drama was a significant influence on the subsequent 2009 series Desperate Romantics. It was also the basis of the historical novel of the same name by Hale. Until a few years ago, it appeared never to have been released on DVD anywhere in the world despite fans calling for such a release on IMDb and elsewhere. However, on 8 April 2019, the DVD of all six episodes was released thanks to the efforts of the team at Simply Media TV. The DVD consists of 2 discs in PAL format for region 2, with a total run time of 450 minutes.

== Cast ==
- Peter Egan as John Everett Millais
- Ben Kingsley as Dante Gabriel Rossetti
- Bernard Lloyd as William Holman Hunt
- Gareth Hunt as Thomas Woolner
- Patricia Quinn as Elizabeth Siddal
- David Collings as John Ruskin
- Anne Kidd as Effie Gray
- Sheila White as Annie Miller
- Kenneth Colley as Edward Burne-Jones
- David Burke as William Morris
- Kika Markham as Jane Morris
- Malcolm Tierney as Ford Madox Brown

== Episodes ==
No.	Title	Directed by	Screenwriter	Original release date
1	"The Brotherhood"	Robert Knights	John Hale	22 January 1975
In 1848, social unrest abounds. The Pre-Raphaelite Brotherhood, a secret group of young artists, forms in order to take on the sclerotic Royal Academy. The original three members are joined by four friends.
2	"An Impeccable Elopement"	Piers Haggard	John Hale	29 January 1975
Art critic John Ruskin and his wife Effie travel to Scotland with John Everett Millais, one of leaders of the PRB. Millais falls in love with Effie and learns that the Ruskins' marriage is a sham.
3	"Seeking the Bubbles"	Piers Haggard	Ray Lawler	5 February 1975
Millais has married Effie after the annulment of her first marriage. William Holman Hunt and Millais both become successful artists.
4	"Remember Me"	John Glenister	Robin Chapman	12 February 1975
Dante Gabriel Rossetti's life and relationships become complicated, especially after the tragic death of his wife Lizzie.
5	"Beata Beatrix"	Piers Haggard	Robin Chapman	19 February 1975
Rossetti acquires a follower in William Morris but his life is troubled by drug addiction, and he becomes increasingly isolated.
6	"The Artisan"	Piers Haggard	John Prebble	26 February 1975
Pre-Raphaelitism begins to disintegrate when William Morris adopts a new ideal in socialism.
