= Elizabeth Siddal =

Pre-Raphaelite model, artist, and poet (1829–1862)

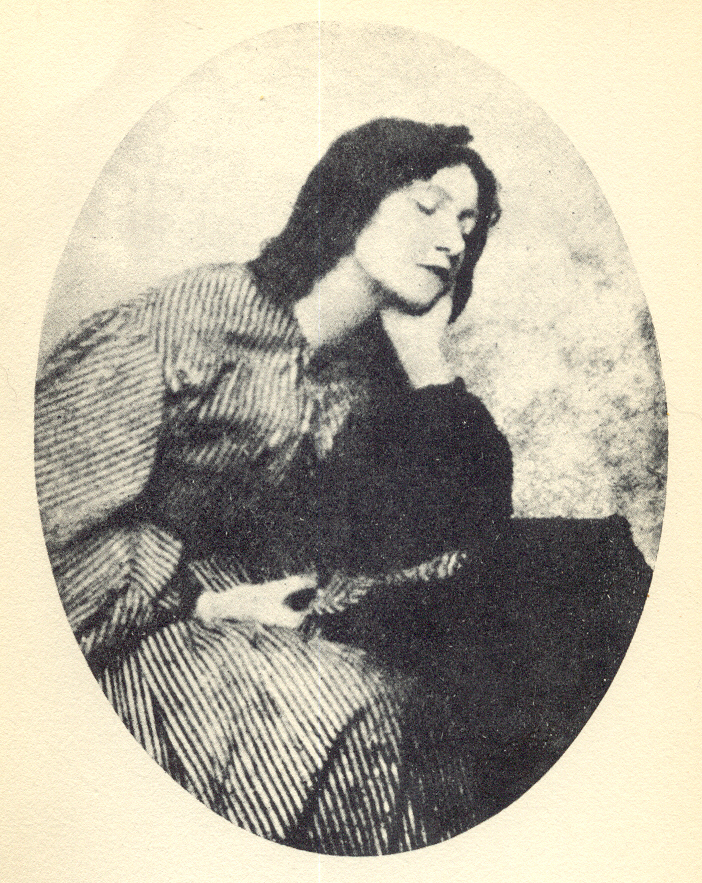
- Siddal, c. 1860
- Born: Elizabeth Eleanor Siddall; 25 July 1829; Holborn, London, England
- Died: 11 February 1862 (aged 32); Blackfriars, London, England
- Burial place: Highgate Cemetery, London
- Other name: Elizabeth Rossetti
- Occupations: Artist; poet; artist's model
- Spouse: Dante Gabriel Rossetti (m. 1860)

Elizabeth Eleanor Siddall (25 July 1829 – 11 February 1862), better known as Elizabeth Siddal (a spelling she adopted in 1853 (Note: At the suggestion of her future husband Dante Gabriel Rossetti, she shortened her surname to Siddal. She was also known by the diminutives such as Lizzie, the Sid, Gug, Guggums, and Dove. Her first signed work in 1853 bears the signature E. E. Siddal. Her legal surname name after her marriage was Rossetti.)), was an English artist, art model, and poet. Siddal was perhaps the most significant of the female models who posed for the Pre-Raphaelite Brotherhood, and she fundamentally influenced and personified their ideal of beauty. Walter Deverell and William Holman Hunt painted Siddal, and she was the model for John Everett Millais's famous painting Ophelia (1852). Early in her relationship with Dante Gabriel Rossetti, Siddal became his muse and model, and he portrayed her in many of his early artworks.

Siddal was an artist in her own right and became the only woman to exhibit at an 1857 Pre-Raphaelite exhibition. Significant collections of her artworks can be found at Wightwick Manor and the Ashmolean Museum. Sickly and melancholic during the last decade of her life, Siddal died of a laudanum overdose in 1862 during her second year of marriage to Rossetti.

== Early life ==
Elizabeth Eleanor Siddall, named after her mother, was born on 25 July 1829, at the family's home at 7 Charles Street, Hatton Garden, at the time in the parish of Saffron Hill, Hatton Garden, Ely Rents and Ely Place in central London. Her parents were Charles Crooke Siddall, and Elizabeth Eleanor Evans, from a family of English and Welsh descent. She had two older siblings, Ann and Charles Robert. At the time of her birth, her father had a cutlery-making business.

About 1831, the Siddall family moved to the less affluent borough of Southwark, in south London. The remainder of the Siddall children were born in Southwark: Lydia, to whom she was particularly close; Mary, Clara, James and Henry. Elizabeth Eleanor Siddall "received an ordinary education, conformable to her condition in life" and first "read Tennyson... by finding one or two poems of his on a piece of paper" that had been wrapped around some butter. Literary analysts have noted that her artwork sometimes used subjects from Tennyson's writings and that his writings may have influenced her poetry.

== Pre-Raphaelite model ==
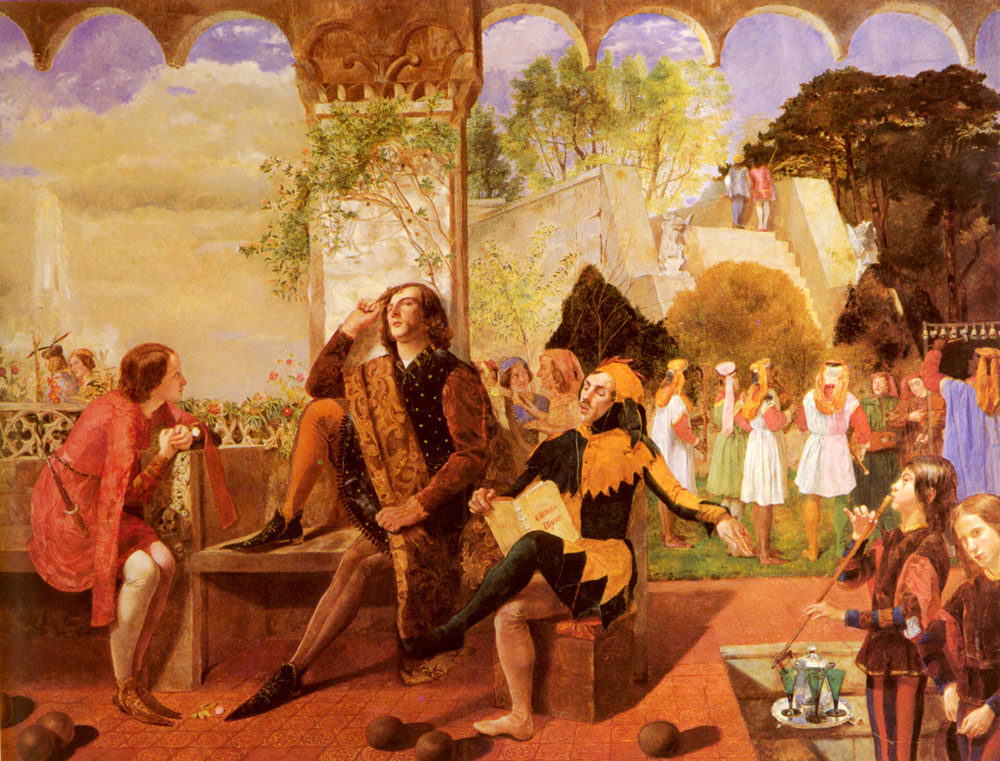
Walter Deverell, Twelfth Night, Act II, Scene IV, 1850

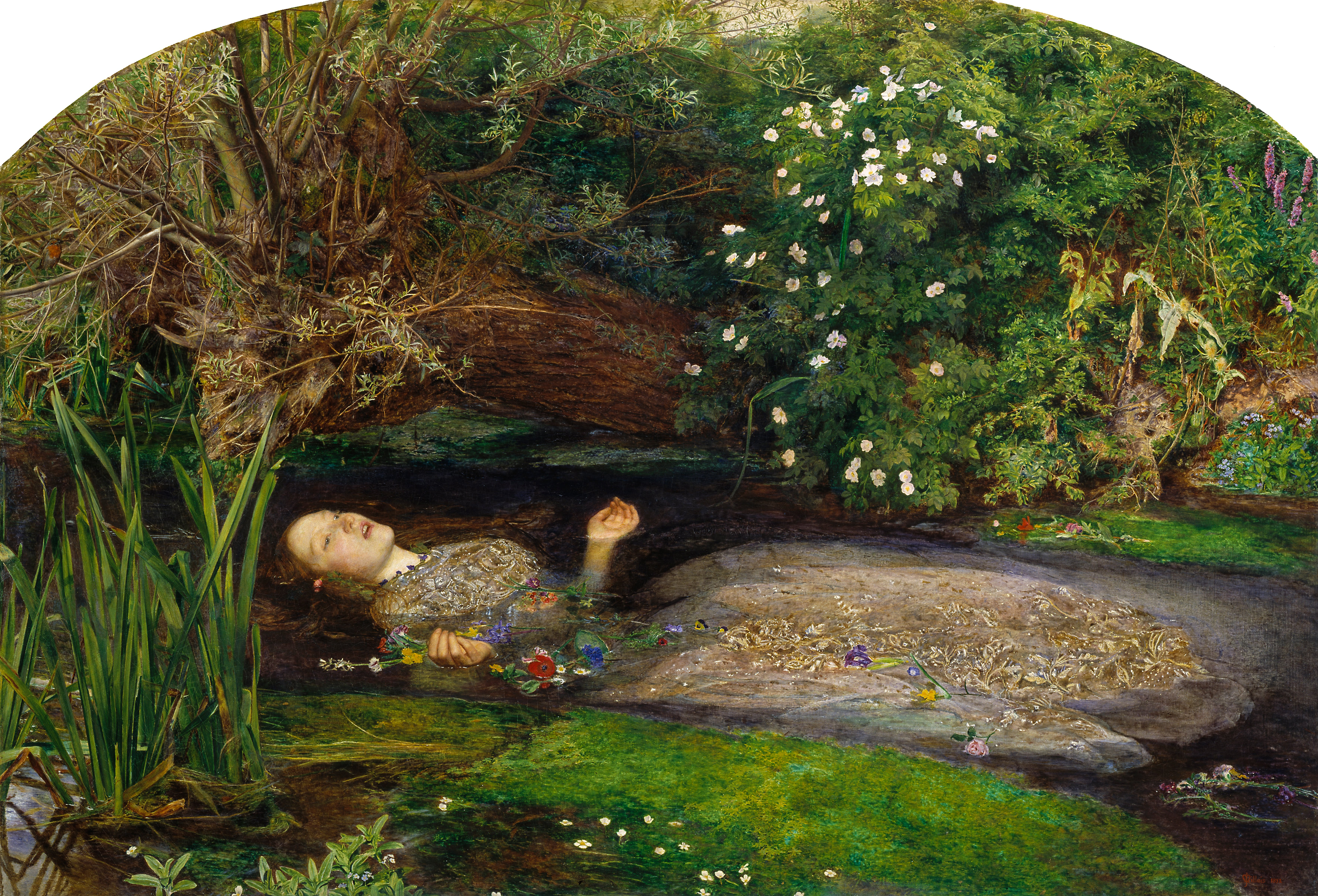
John Everett Millais, Ophelia (1851–52)

In 1849, while working at a millinery in Cranbourne Alley, London, Siddal made the acquaintance of Walter Deverell. Accounts differ on the circumstances of their meeting. One account is that she became acquainted with Deverell's father, who worked at the Government School of Design, then at Somerset House. Siddal showed some of her artwork to him, and he introduced her to his son. In another account, William Allingham visited the milliner's to meet a woman he was acquainted with and admired; Siddal was the woman's co-worker and joined the pair on their walk home, as it was the women's usual practice to travel home from work together. Siddal made such an impression on Allingham that he recommended her as a possible model to his friend Deverell, who was struggling with a large oil painting based on the Shakespeare play Twelfth Night.

A third account has Deverell accompanying his mother to the millinery where he noticed Siddal in the back of the shop. In any case, Deverell later described Siddal as "magnificently tall, with a lovely figure, and a face of the most delicate and finished modelling ... she has grey eyes, and her hair is like dazzling copper, and shimmers with luster." Deverell subsequently employed Siddal as a model and introduced her to the Pre-Raphaelites.

As with the other Pre-Raphaelites, Deverell took his inspiration directly from life rather than from an idealized classical figure. In his Twelfth Night painting, he based Orsino on himself, Feste on his friend Dante Gabriel Rossetti and Viola/Cesario on Siddal. This was the first time Siddal sat as a model. According to William Michael Rossetti, Dante Gabriel's brother, "Deverell drew another Viola from her, in an etching for The Germ." Elaine Shefer asserts that Deverell portrayed Siddal in A Pet and The Grey Parrot.

William Holman Hunt painted her in A Converted British Family Sheltering a Christian Missionary from the Persecution of the Druids (1849–1850) and Two Gentlemen of Verona, Valentine Rescuing Sylvia From Proteus (1850 or 1851).

For John Everett Millais's Ophelia, Siddal floated in a bathtub full of water to portray the drowning Ophelia. Millais painted daily through the winter, putting oil lamps under the tub to warm the water. On one occasion, the lamps went out and the water became icy cold. Millais, absorbed by his painting, did not notice and Siddal did not complain. After this, she became ill with a severe cold or pneumonia. Her father held Millais responsible and, under the threat of legal action, Millais paid her doctor's bills.

Siddal came to either embody or influence the Pre-Raphaelite ideals of feminine beauty.

== Artwork and poetry ==
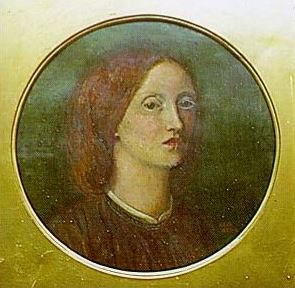
Elizabeth Siddal, self-portrait, 1854

In 1853, Siddal signed The Lady of Shalott as "E. E. Siddal", the first time she had signed one of her works and an early instance of her shortened surname. By that same year, Rossetti had taken Siddal on as a student. He told his friend Ford Madox Brown that her "fecundity of invention and facility are quite wonderful, much greater than mine". Siddal seems to have inspired Rossetti, as he followed her in depicting the same subjects, and he reused her designs after her death.

Siddal's 1854 self-portrait (see right) diverged from the Pre-Raphaelites' typical idealised beauty. As Anna Solomon wrote, "she depicts herself looking harsher, angrier and less attractive than the languid Siddal of the Pre-Raphaelite paintings." From 1855 to 1857, art critic John Ruskin subsidised her career and paid £150 per year in exchange for all the drawings and paintings she produced. She produced many sketches, drawings, and watercolours as well as one oil painting. Her sketches are similar to other Pre-Raphaelite compositions illustrating Arthurian legend and other idealized medieval themes, and she was the only woman who exhibited with the Pre-Raphaelites at an 1857 exhibition at No. 4 Russell Place, Fitzroy Square, London. That same year, Siddal studied at the Sheffield School of Art.

During Siddal's career as an artist and poet from 1852 to 1861, she produced more than a hundred works. Unpublished during her lifetime, her poetry often dwelt on dark themes, lost love, or the impossibility of true love. Her small poetic output was nonetheless accomplished. Constance Hassett wrote that "Siddal's poetry ranges from the perfectly realized ballad narrative, to its opposite, the overheard lyric, and to something in between, the made-to-be heard monologue." Critic William Gaunt wrote that "Her verses were as simple and moving as ancient ballads; her drawings were as genuine in their medieval spirit as much more highly finished and competent works of Pre-Raphaelite art."

== Relationship with Rossetti ==
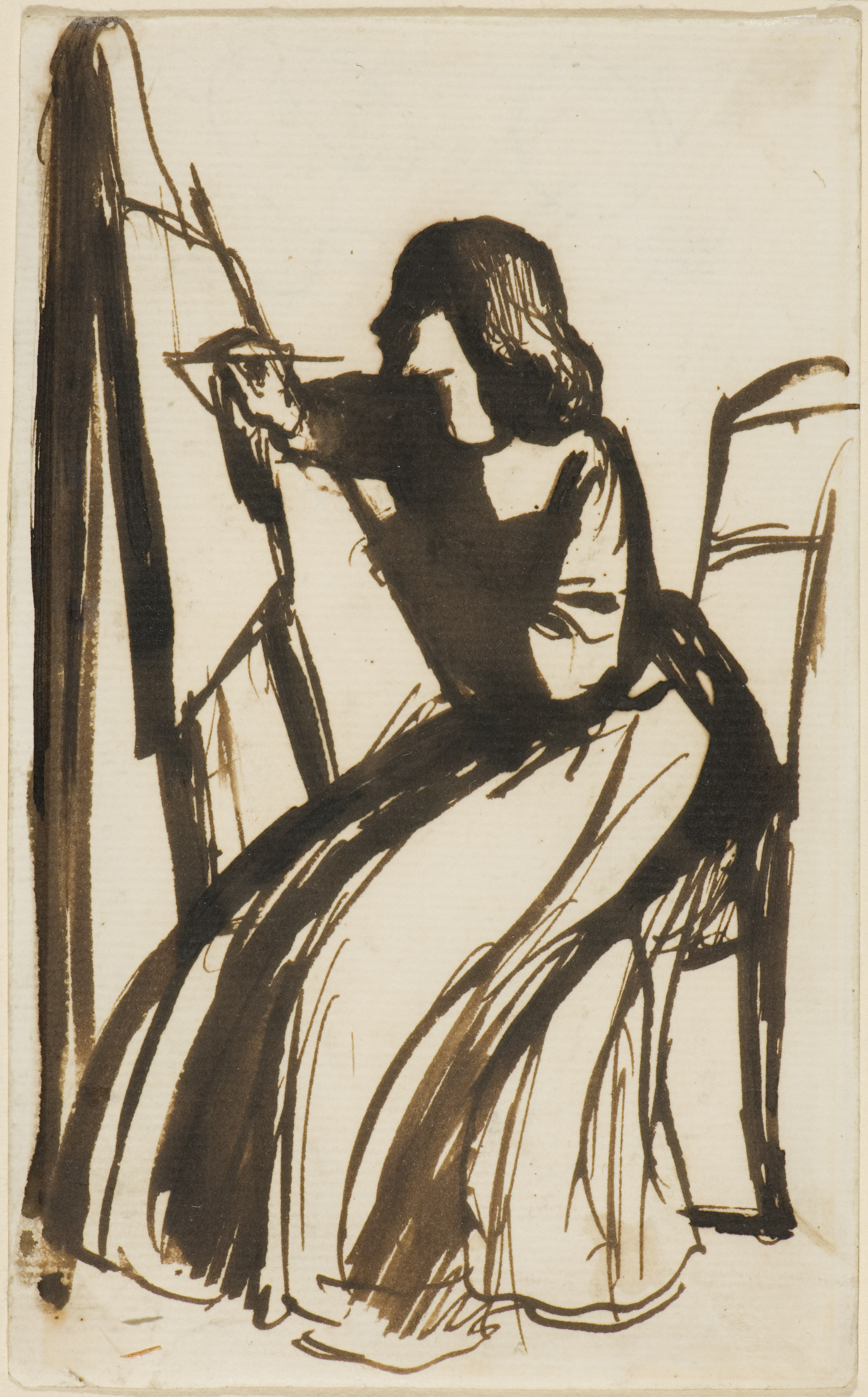
Rossetti's 1852 drawing of Siddal painting

Dante Gabriel Rossetti met Siddal in 1849, probably while they both modelled for Deverell. Rossetti gave Siddal the nickname "Lizzie" when she entered the Pre-Raphaelite Brotherhood circle, and "the diminutive enhanced her youthful, dependent role". By 1851 or 1852, they became semi-engaged. Siddal had also become Rossetti's main model and muse, and he stopped her from modelling for others.

In 1852, Siddal began to study with Rossetti. She started staying at his Chatham Place residence, sometimes with him and sometimes by herself. They subsequently became anti-social and absorbed in each other's affections. They coined affectionate nicknames for one another, such as "Guggums" or "Gug" and "Dove", the latter one of Rossetti's names for Siddal. He also shortened the spelling of her surname to Siddal, dropping the second l.

During this period, Rossetti's most abundant and personal works were his pencil sketches of Siddal at home, most of which he entitled simply "Elizabeth Siddal". He portrayed Siddal in moments of leisure, such as reading, sitting, or in repose, or when painting or drawing. She also became the subject of much of Rossetti's poetry throughout their relationship and particularly after her death. Rossetti became obsessive in portraying Siddal. It has been estimated that there are thousands of Rossetti's drawings, paintings, and poems in which Siddal was a subject.

Beginning in 1853, Rossetti used Siddal as a model for a series of Dante-themed paintings, including The First Anniversary of the Death of Beatrice (1852), Beatrice Meeting Dante at a Marriage Feast, Denies him her Salutation (1851), Dante's Vision of Rachel and Leah (1855), and, perhaps his most famous portrait of her, Beata Beatrix (1864–1870), which he painted as a memorial after her death.

As Siddal came from a working-class family, Rossetti feared introducing her to his family. Siddal was the victim of harsh criticism from his sisters. The knowledge that his family would not approve contributed to Rossetti's delaying the marriage. Siddal appears to have believed, with some justification, that Rossetti was always seeking to replace her with a younger muse, which contributed to her later depressive periods and illness. Although Ruskin urged Rossetti to marry in 1855, their relationship deteriorated: the reasons probably included Siddal's ill-health, her laudanum addiction, Rossetti's philandering, Rossetti's lack of funds, the aforementioned disapproval of the Rossetti family, and Rossetti's probable aversion to marriage in general.

In 1857, Siddal gave up her stipend from Ruskin and went to Sheffield, the birth place of her father, to attend the school of art there. She moved in with her cousin's family. (Note: The father in this family was William Ibbett, an artist and silver-chaser and his son was Willie Ibbitt. Alyssa Grady identifies the writer of the letter to the editor, "The Death of Mrs. D. G. Rosetta," signed "W.I", as William Ibbitt.) A son of this family, Willie Ibbitt, proposed to her, but she indicated that she was already engaged. However, by mid-1858, Siddal's and Rossetti's engagement appeared to be over and little is known about Siddal from that time until 1860.

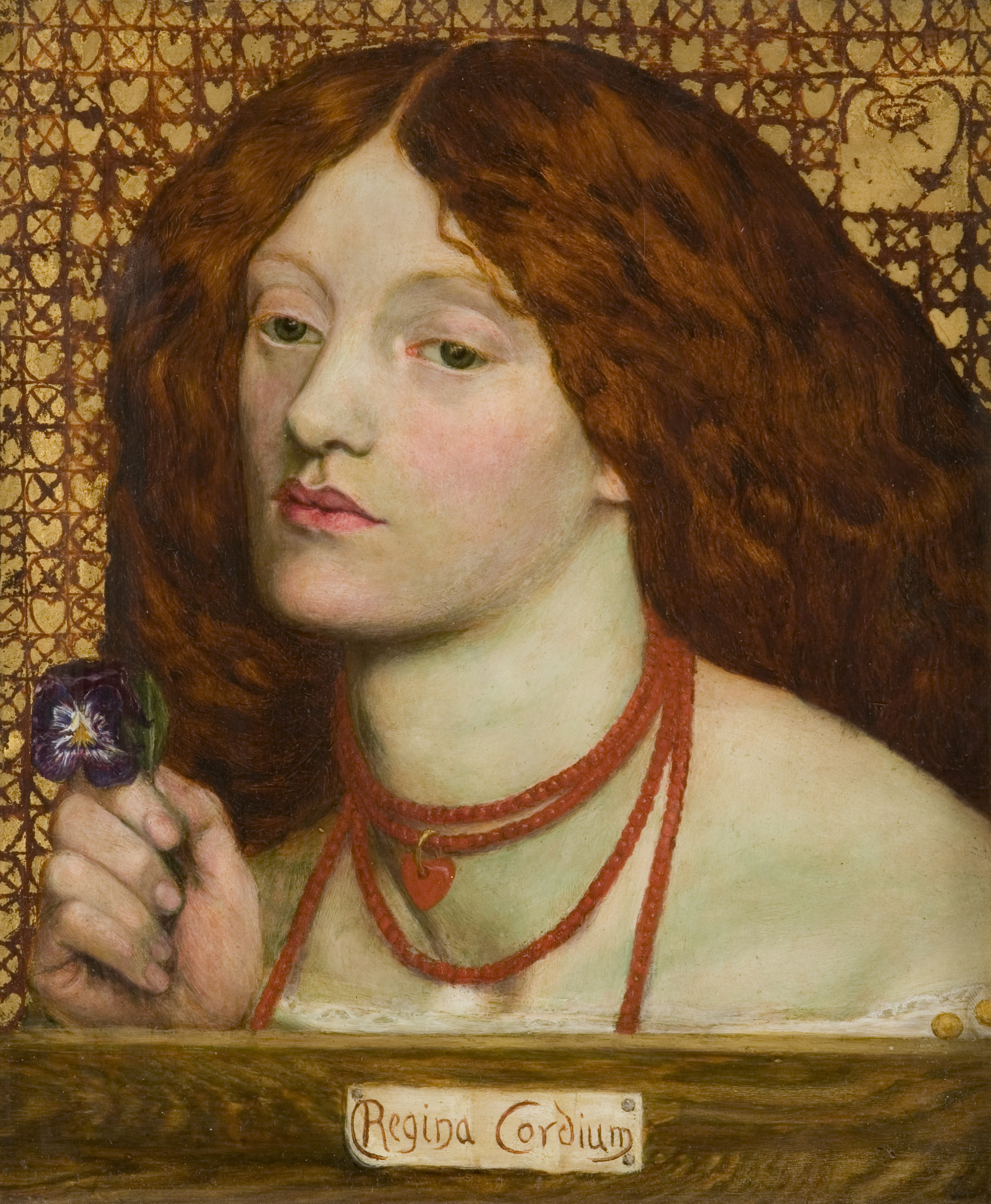
Regina Cordium, Rossetti's 1860 marriage portrait of Siddal

In Spring 1860, Siddal's family contacted Ruskin with the news that Siddal was gravely ill. Ruskin in turn informed Rossetti. Siddal was at the seaside resort of Hastings. In a change of heart, Rossetti hurried to her side that April with a marriage licence. Shortly before their marriage, Rossetti produced a famous portrait of Siddal, Regina Cordium or The Queen of Hearts (1860). This painting is a close-up, vibrantly coloured depiction of Siddal.

Siddal and Rossetti married on Wednesday, 23 May 1860 at St. Clement's Church in Hastings. There were no family or friends present, only a couple of witnesses whom they had asked. When Siddal's health improved, they honeymooned in Paris and Boulogne in the latter half of 1860, then returned to the Chatham Place residence that they expanded into an adjoining house. Siddal became pregnant and appeared to be happier and healthier.

== Ill health and death ==
In Elizabeth Siddal's constitution there was a consumptive taint. This may, I suppose, have come from the father; for the mother was a healthy woman, living on til past ninety.

— William Michael Rossetti, Dante Gabriel's brother

It was thought that she suffered from tuberculosis, but some historians believe an intestinal disorder was more likely. Elbert Hubbard wrote that "She suffered much from neuralgia, and the laudanum taken to relieve the pain had grown into a necessity." Others suggest that she may have been anorexic or that her poor health was due to laudanum addiction or a combination of ailments.

Siddal travelled to Paris and Nice for several years for her health. At the time of her wedding, she was so frail and ill that she had to be carried to the church, despite it being a five-minute walk from where she was staying. She became severely depressed and her long illness gave her access to laudanum to which she became addicted. By 1861, Siddal became pregnant, which ended with the birth of a stillborn daughter. The stillbirth left Siddal with post-partum depression. By early 1862, she had become pregnant for a second time.

Siddal overdosed on laudanum on 10 February 1862. She, Rossetti, and his friend Algernon Charles Swinburne had dined together in a nearby hotel. After having taken Siddal home, Rossetti attended his weekly lecture at the Working Men's College. Upon returning home from teaching, Rossetti found Siddal unconscious in bed and could not revive her. The first doctor Rossetti called claimed that he was unable to save her, upon which Rossetti sent for another three doctors. A stomach pump was used, but to no avail. She died at 7:20 am on 11 February 1862 at their home at 14 Chatham Place. Her obituary noted that she "had expressed no wish to die, but quite the reverse. Indeed she contemplated going out of town in a day or two, and had ordered a new mantle which she intended to wear on the occasion." The coroner ruled her death as accidental; however, there are suggestions that Rossetti found a suicide note, with the words "Please look after Harry" (her invalid brother, who may have had a slight intellectual disability), supposedly "pinned ... on the breast of her night-shirt." Consumed with grief and guilt Rossetti allegedly went to see Ford Madox Brown who is supposed to have instructed him to burn the note. Since suicide was illegal and considered immoral, it would have brought scandal on the family and barred Siddal from a Christian burial.

== After Siddal's death ==
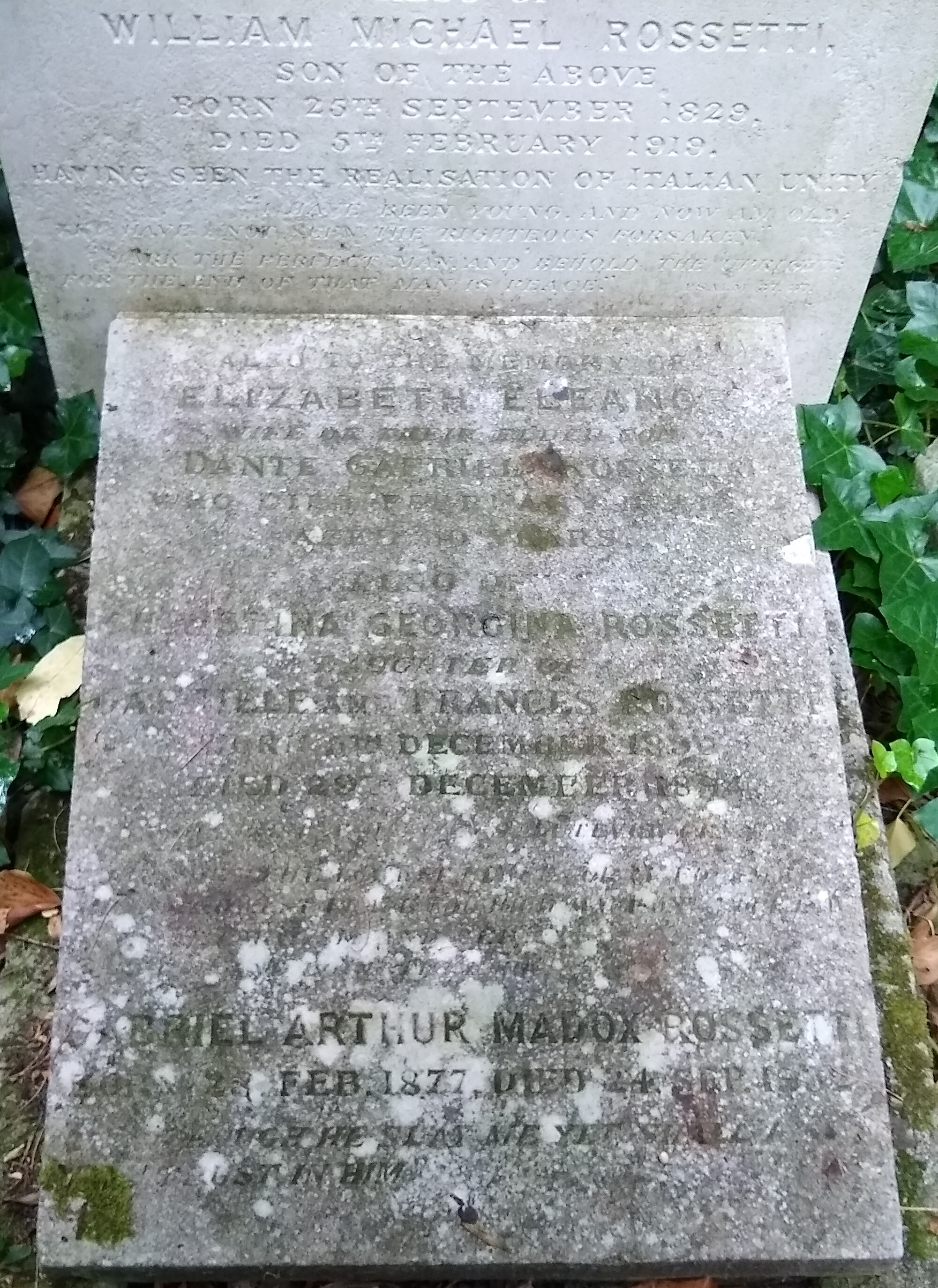
Siddal's grave in Highgate Cemetery (West side)

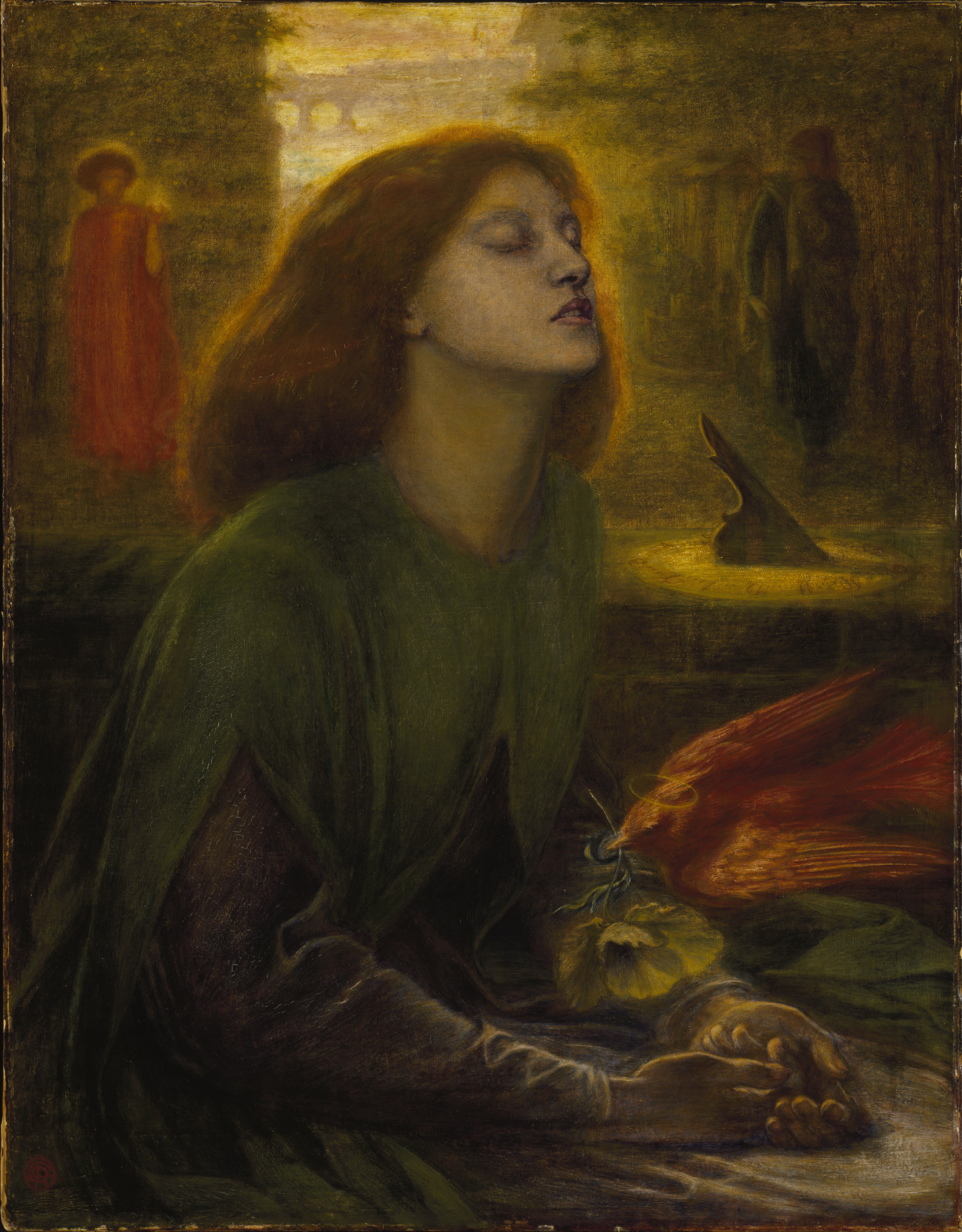
Rossetti completed Beata Beatrix a year after Siddal's death

Siddal was buried with her father-in-law Gabriele on 17 February 1862 in the Rossetti family grave in the west side of Highgate Cemetery. Later burials in the same grave are her mother-in-law Frances Rossetti (1886), Christina Georgina Rossetti (1895), and William Michael Rossetti (1919).

In August 1869, Rossetti authorized Charles Howell to disinter her coffin to retrieve a handwritten book of Rossetti's poems, which he had laid beside her head before burial. With the aid of a Dr. Llewelyn Williams and two others, Howell accomplished this in October 1869. Dr. Williams subsequently disinfected the book. Rossetti then published the contents in Poems (1870).

These became part of Rossetti's sonnet sequence entitled The House of Life. This sequence contained the poem "Without Her", a reflection on life once love has departed.

What of her glass without her? The blank grey
There where the pool is blind of the moon's face.
Her dress without her? The tossed empty space
Of cloud-rack whence the moon has passed away.
Her paths without her? Day's appointed sway
Usurped by desolate night. Her pillowed place
Without her? Tears, ah me! For love's good grace,
And cold forgetfulness of night or day.

What of the heart without her? Nay, poor heart,
Of thee what word remains ere speech be still?
A wayfarer by barren ways and chill,
Steep ways and weary, without her thou art,
Where the long cloud, the long wood's counterpart,
Sheds doubled up darkness up the labouring hill.

— Dante Gabriel Rossetti, "The House of Life", Ballads and Sonnets

== Legacy ==
Their home at 14 Chatham Place was demolished and is now covered by Blackfriars Station.

=== Exhibitions and collections ===
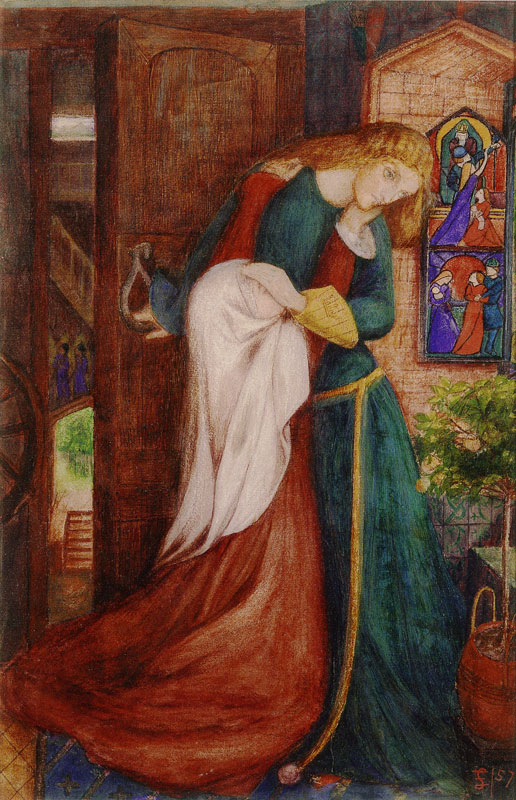
Elizabeth Siddal, Lady Clare, 1857

A retrospective of Siddal's work was curated by Jan Marsh in 1991 at the Ruskin Gallery in Sheffield.

Rosalie Glynn Grylls bought some of Siddal's works at auction in 1961. These works became part of Wightwick Manor, donated by her husband, Geoffrey Mander, and her to the National Trust. A 2018 exhibition, "Beyond Ophelia", curated by National Trust Assistant Curator Hannah Squire, ran for nine months and featured twelve artworks by Siddal and owned by the National Trust. Only the second solo exhibition of her work, the exhibition examined Siddal's career, artistic style, subject matter, and recognition of the challenges she faced as a female artist.

Siddal was among the women featured in the 2019 Pre-Raphaelite Sisters exhibition at London's National Portrait Gallery.

In 2023, the Tate Gallery had an exhibition The Rossettis which included 17 of Siddal's works. The exhibition travelled later that year to the Delaware Art Museum, which was the first time the material was assembled and displayed in the US.

=== Works inspired by Siddal ===
==== Literature ====
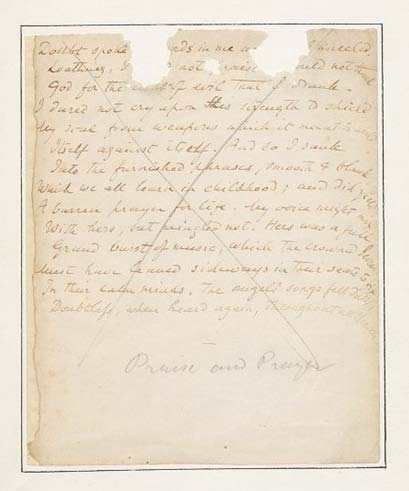
One of three surviving pages from the book of poems buried with Siddal.

Writer and curator Jan Marsh wrote that those fascinated by Siddal included Swinburne, Oscar Wilde, and Arthur Symons. The artist and author Charles Ricketts confessed that "Oh, we have all, when young, been in love with Miss Siddal." With the emerging fields of psychology and sexology, a reevaluation of Siddal in fiction, poems, and biographies occurred in the 1920s and 1930s. She became regarded as "a morbid, hysterical, suicidal woman clinging to her virginity and angrily jealous of her rivals". By the mid-twentieth century, perceptions had changed again so that Siddal became "a Pre-Raphaelite groupie, a child of the 1950s and 60s pop culture." More recently, authors and biographers have reassessed Siddal. In this reexamination, she emerges as "partly a victim of masculine oppression and partly a rediscovered proto-feminist", and a rediscovery that includes "a determined effort to detach Elizabeth Siddal's story from that of Rossetti and the PRB, ... and present her with a biography of her own."

Along with Algernon Charles Swinburne, Siddal and Rossetti are the subjects of "How They Met Themselves", which is part of The Sandman series by Neil Gaiman, drawn by Michael Zulli, and published in Vertigo: Winter's Edge #3 (2000). In it, a dying Lizzie drugged with laudanum has a last dream or vision in which the trio takes a train trip to a forest "where they each would see their true love". This story bears the same title as a drawing and a painting by Rossetti that both depict Siddal.

==== Television ====
Rossetti's relationship with Siddal has been the subject of television dramas, notably Dante's Inferno (1967), by Ken Russell, in which she was played by Judith Paris and Rossetti by Oliver Reed; The Love School (1975) in which she was played by Patricia Quinn; and Desperate Romantics (2009) in which she was played by Amy Manson. She was portrayed in a recurring role by Hannah Onslow in the Paramount+ adaptation of Elizabeth Macneal's The Doll Factory (2023).

==== Art ====
Siddal is depicted on one of the plates in the Famous Women Dinner Service by Vanessa Bell and Duncan Grant, (1932–1934), commissioned by the art historian, Kenneth Clark.

The Delaware Art Museum hosted a 2022 exhibit of Holly Trostle Brigham's works inspired by and portraying Siddal in conjunction with its Pre-Raphaellite collection that includes works by and a Rossetti portrait of Siddal.

==== Music ====
The English guitarist-composer Stephen Yates was moved to compose a suite for solo classical guitar entitled The Four Muses of Mr Rossetti, based on his interest in the Pre-Raphaelite brotherhood and their wide ranging influence on the culture of the period. The four movements of the suite are dedicated to Elizabeth Siddal, Fanny Cornforth, Jane Morris and Alexa Wilding.

== Gallery ==
=== Works by Siddal ===
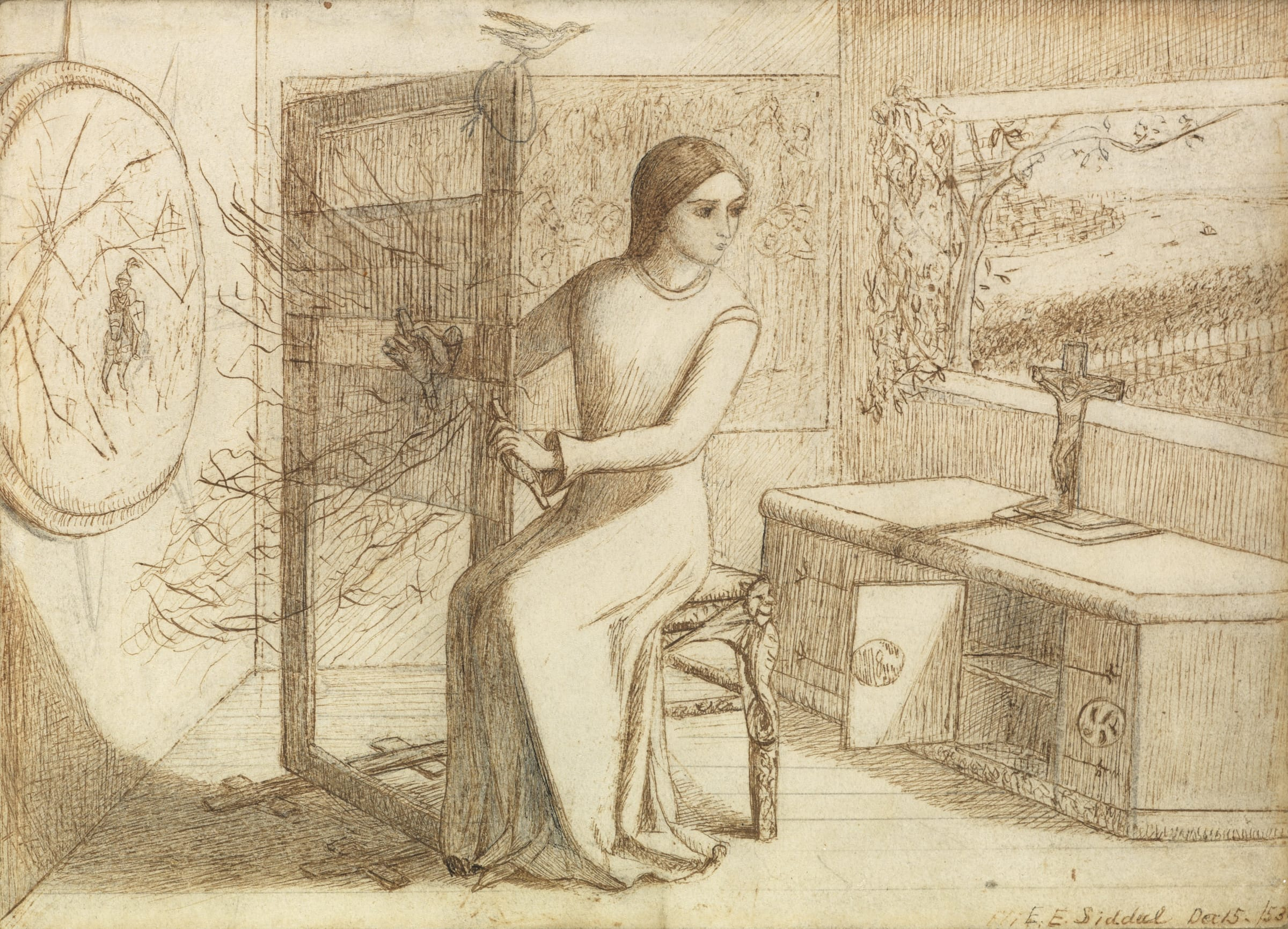
The Lady of Shalott, 1853, pen, black ink, sepia and pencil

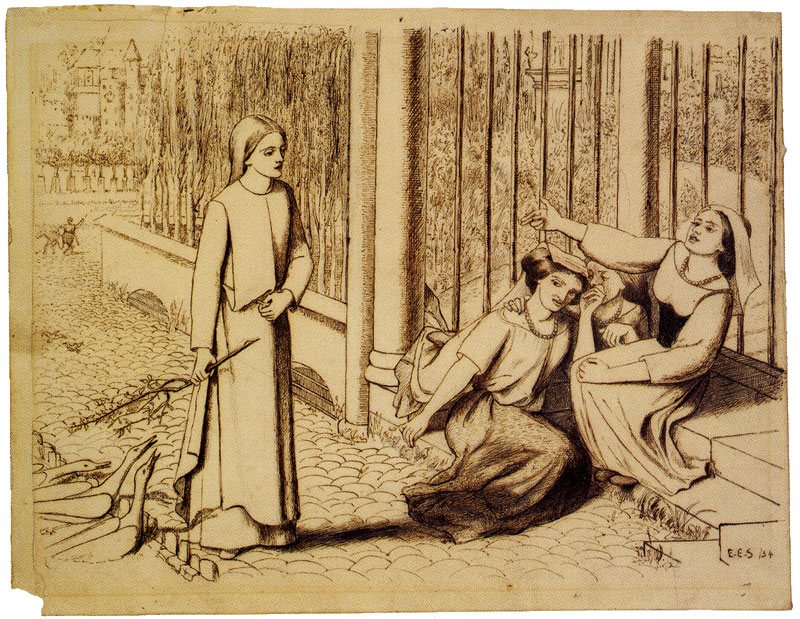
Pippa Passes, 1854, pen and ink

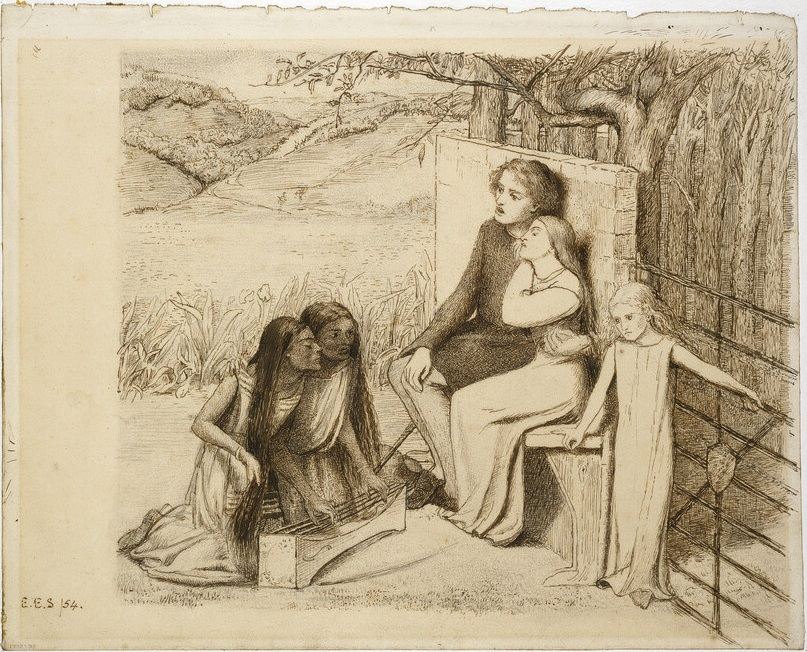
Lovers Listening to Music, 1854, pen and brown ink

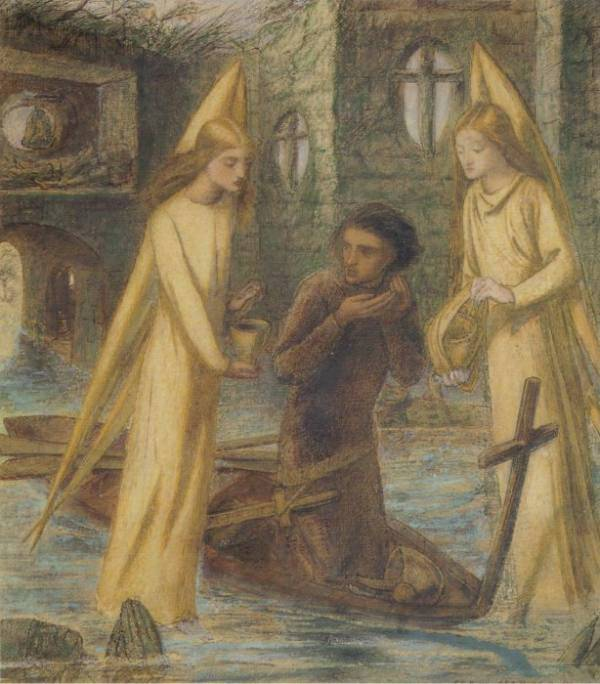
The Quest of the Holy Grail, 1855, watercolour, conceived by Siddal, collaboration with Rossetti

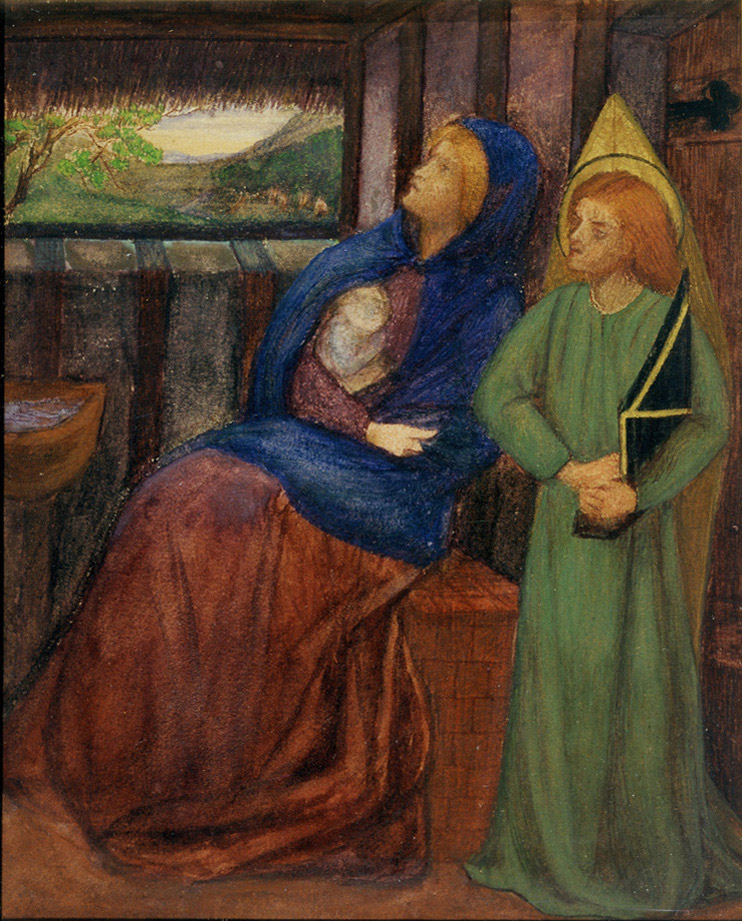
Holy Family, circa 1856, watercolour, gouache and metallic paint

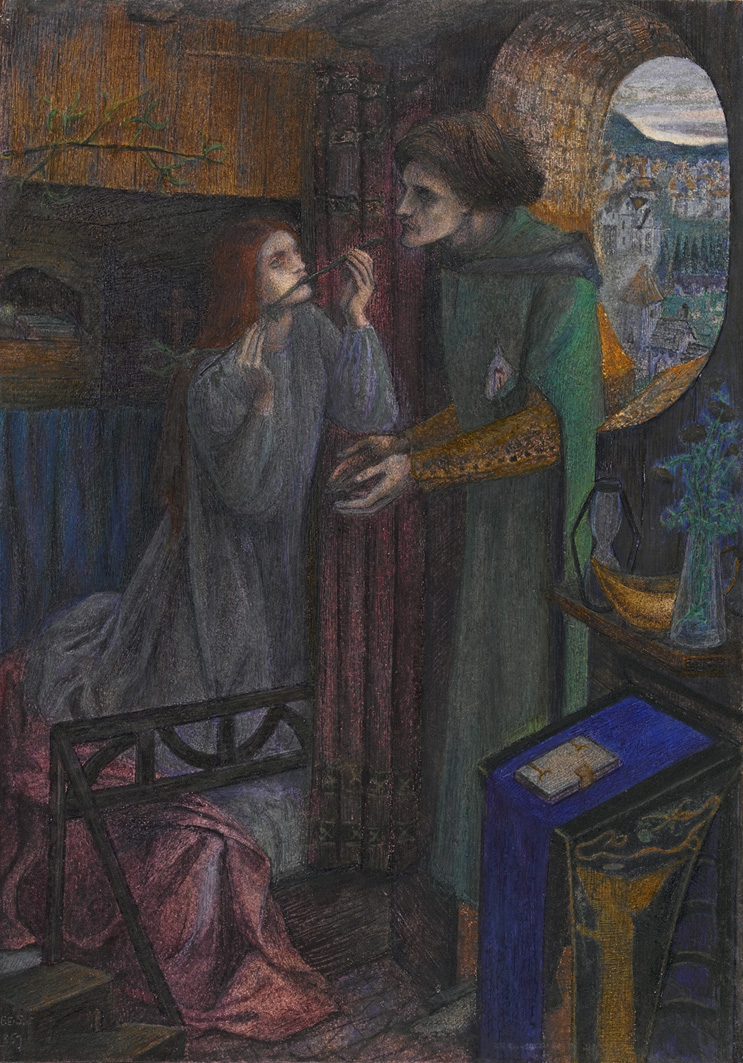
Clerk Saunders, 1857, watercolour, bodycolour, coloured chalks

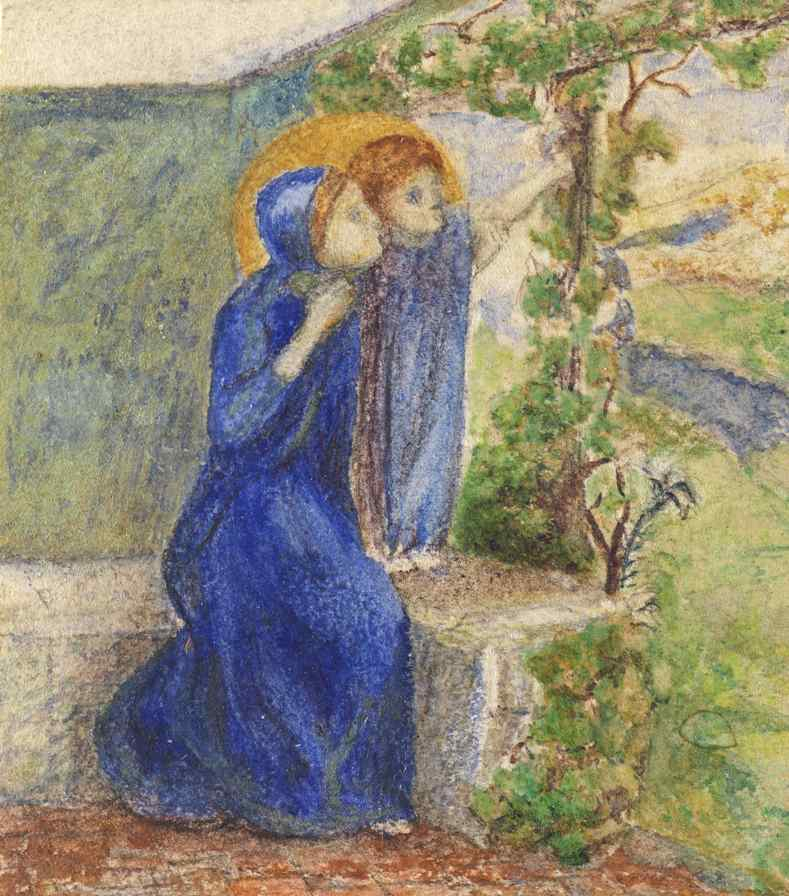
Madonna and Child, unknown date, watercolor on pencil

=== Works with Siddal as a model ===
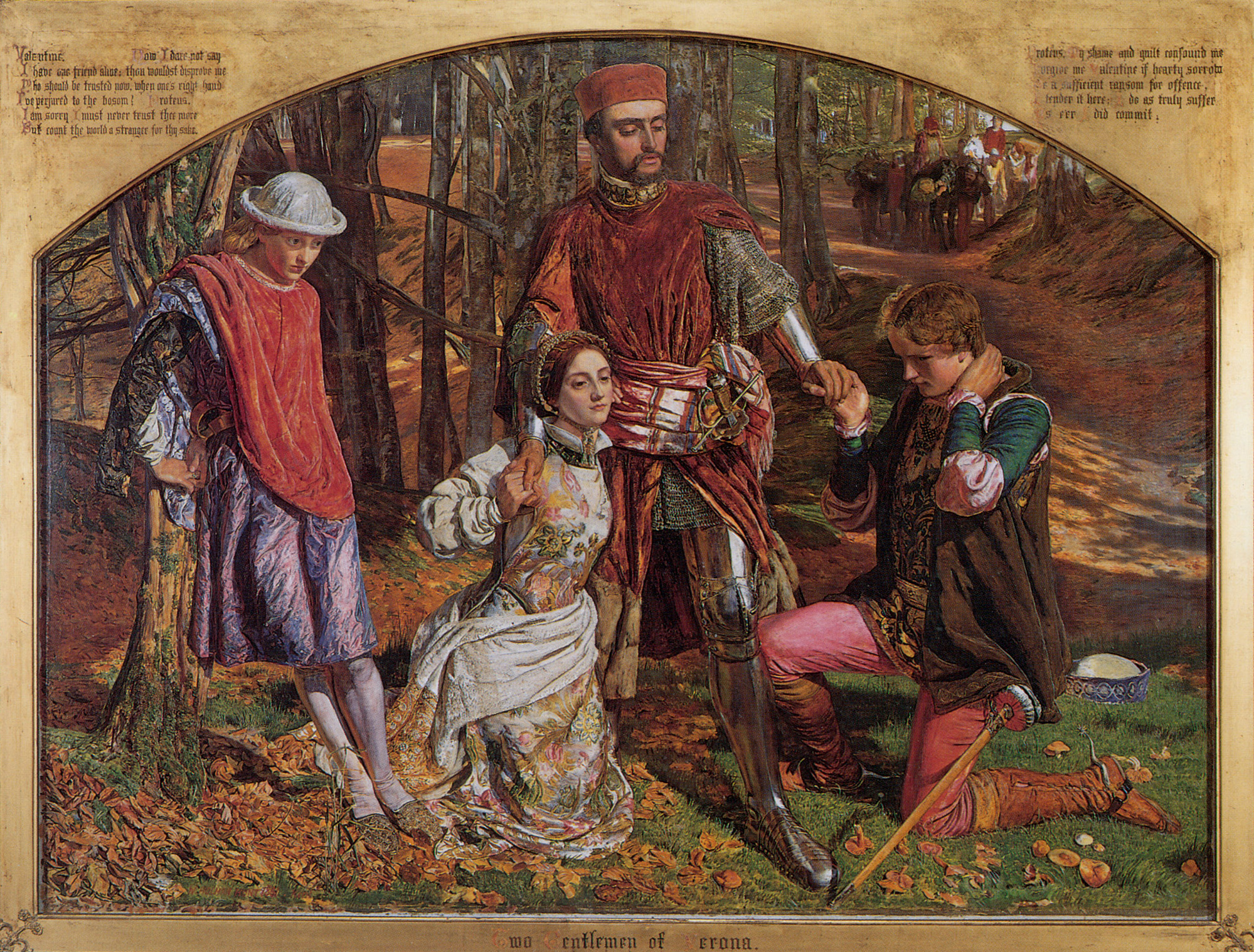
William Holman Hunt, Two Gentlemen of Verona, Valentine Rescuing Sylvia From Proteus, 1850 or 1851

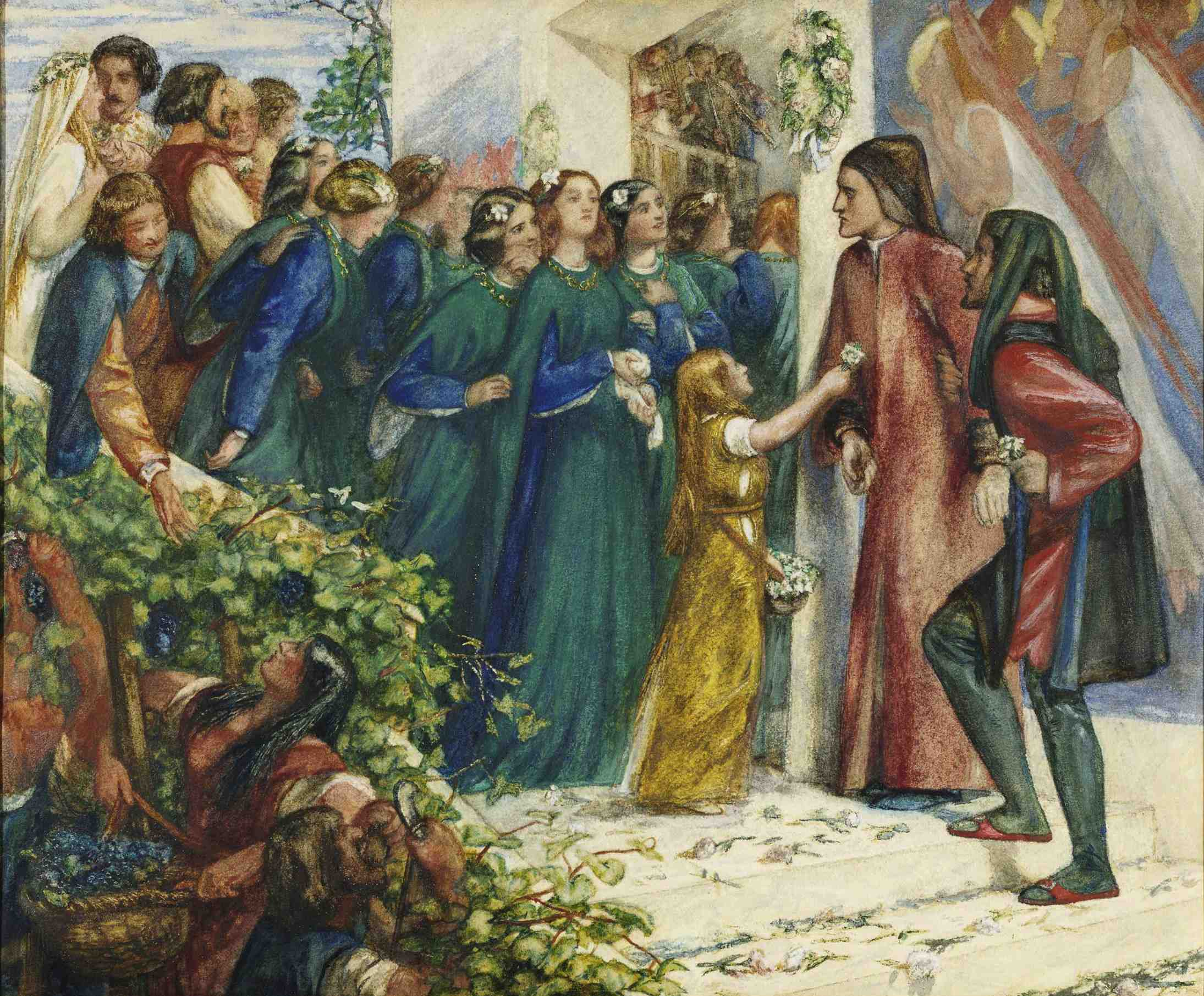
Dante Gabriel Rossetti, Beatrice meeting Dante at a marriage feast, denies him her salutation, 1852

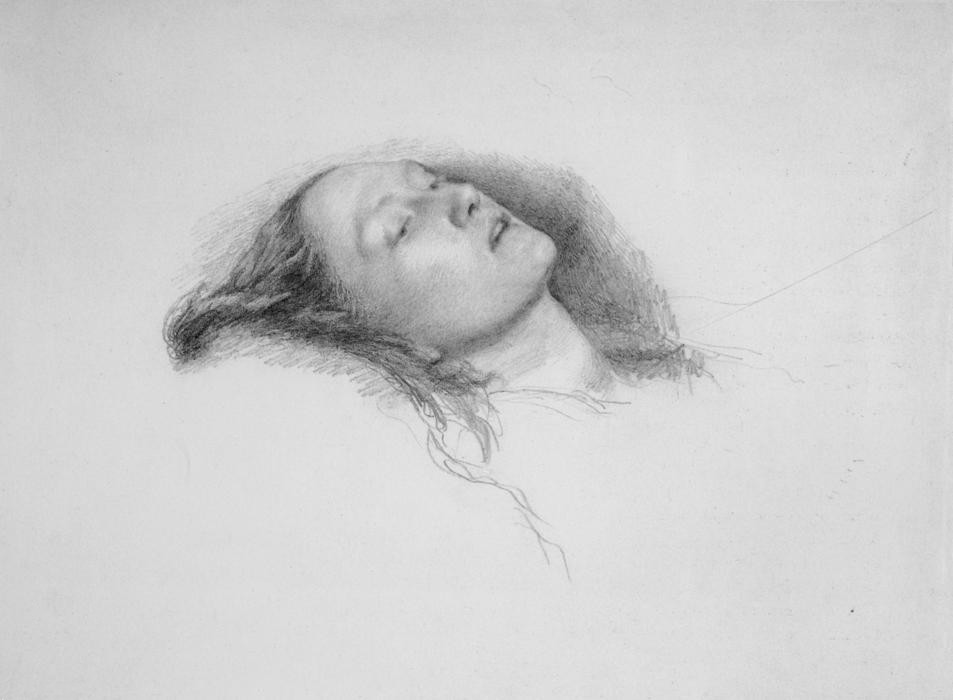
John Everett Millais, Elizabeth Siddal – Study for Ophelia, 1852

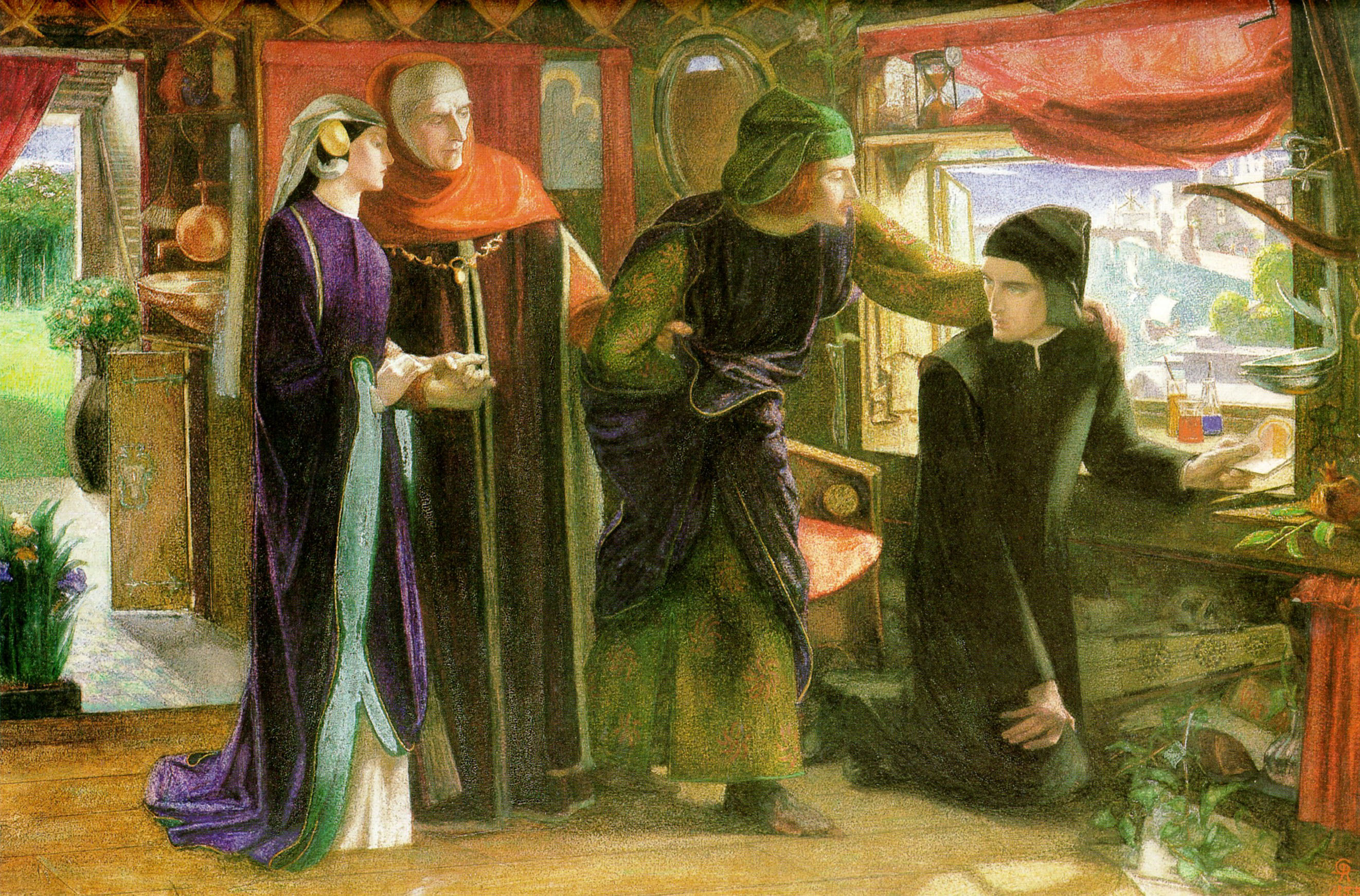
Dante Gabriel Rossetti, The First Anniversary of the Death of Beatrice, 1853

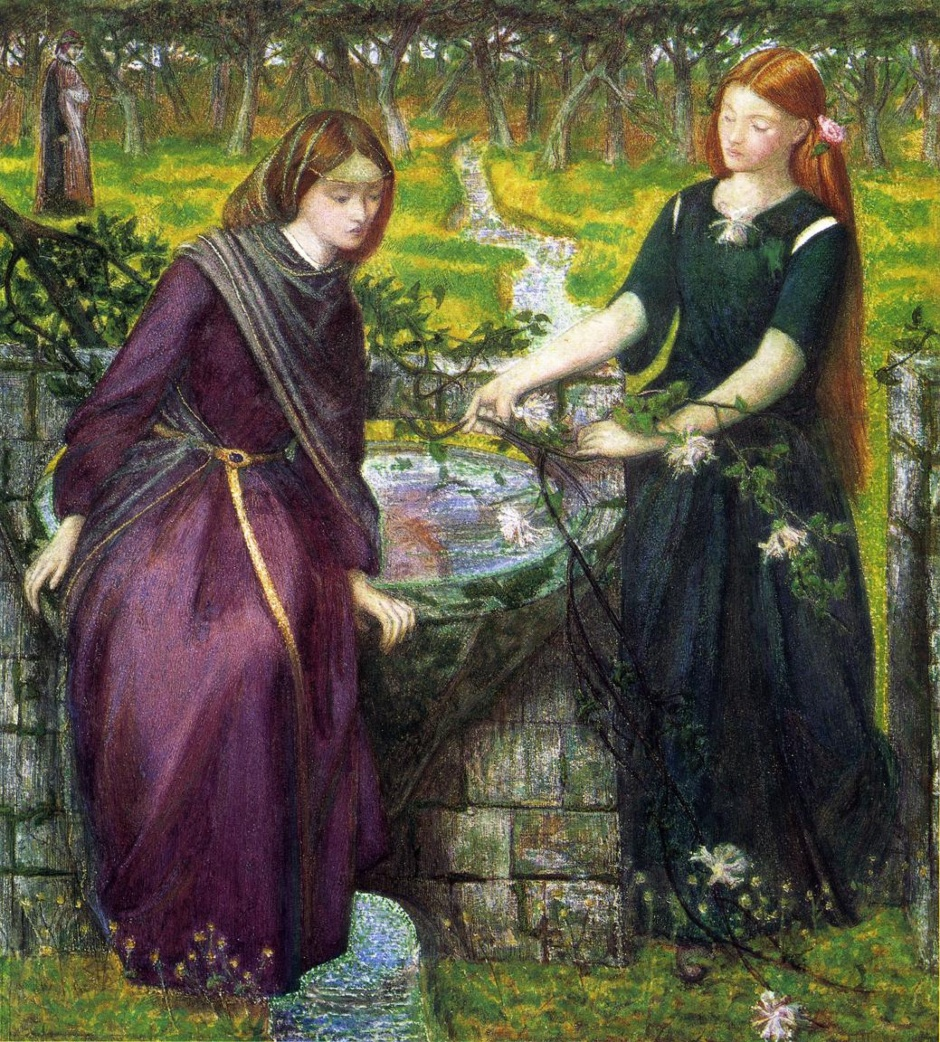
Dante Gabriel Rossetti, Dante's Vision of Rachel and Leah, 1855

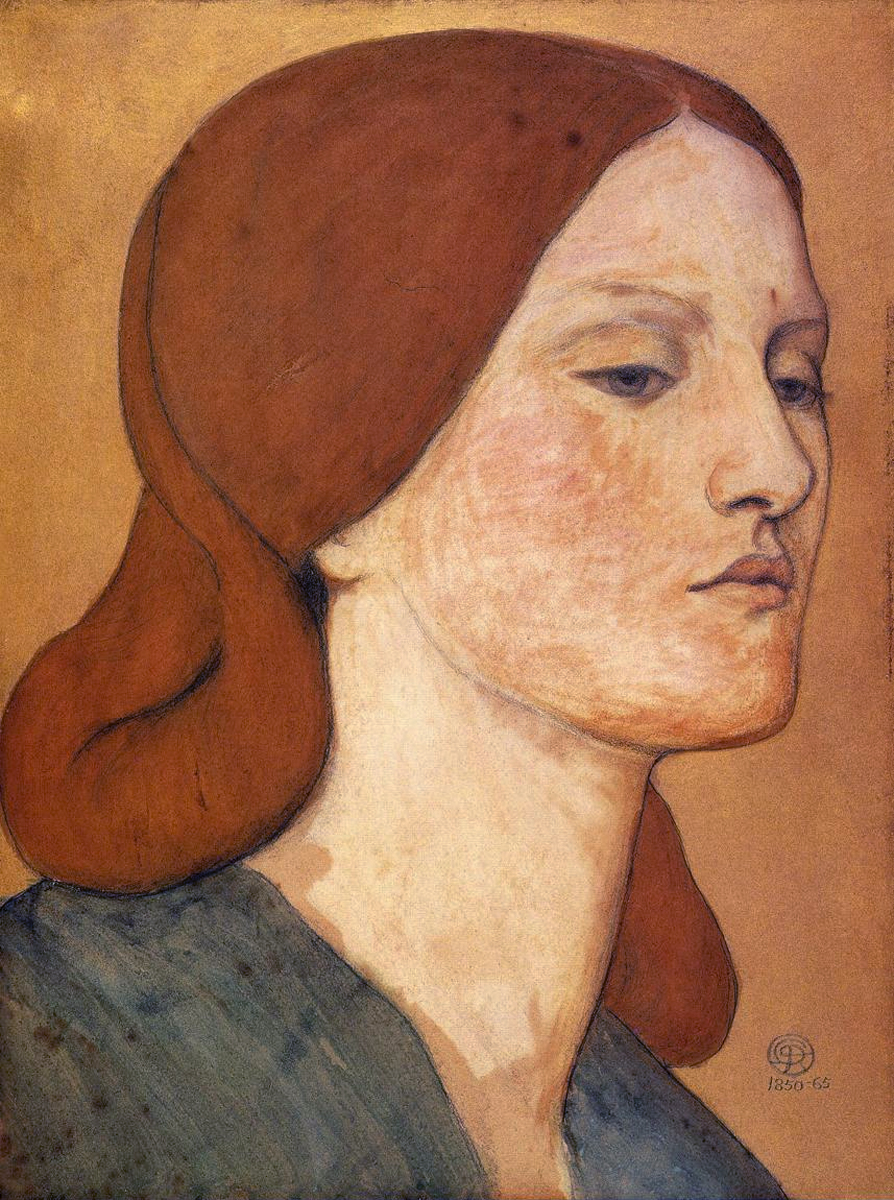
Dante Gabriel Rossetti, Elizabeth Siddal, 1850–65

== Selected works ==
=== Drawings ===
- The Lady of Shalott (n.d.), J.S. Maas Collection
- Lovers listening to Music (1954), Wightwick Manor, West Midlands
- Pippa Passes (1854), Ashmolean Museum, Oxford, England

=== Paintings ===
- Self Portrait (1853–54) – oil, private collection
- The Quest of the Holy Grail (1855) – watercolour, Tate Gallery, London
- The Haunted Wood (1856) – watercolour, Tate Gallery, London
- Lady Affixing a Pennant to a Knight's Spear (1856) – watercolour, Tate Gallery
- Madonna and Child with an Angel (c. 1856) – watercolour, Delaware Art Museum, Wilmington, Delaware
- Sir Patrick Spens (1856) – watercolour, Tate Gallery, London
- Clerk Saunders (1857) – watercolour, Fitzwilliam Museum, Cambridge, England
- Lady Clare (1857) – watercolour, private collection

=== Poetry ===
- — (2018). Trowbridge, Serena (ed.). My Ladys Soul: The Poems of Elizabeth Eleanor Siddall. Brighton, U.K: Victorian Secrets Limited. ISBN 978-1-906469-62-7. OCLC 1054934095.
- — (1979). He & She & Angels Three: Three Poems. London: Eric and Joan Stevens. OCLC 6043505.

== See also ==
- List of paintings by Dante Gabriel Rossetti
