= Fanny Cornforth =

English artist's model (1835–1909)

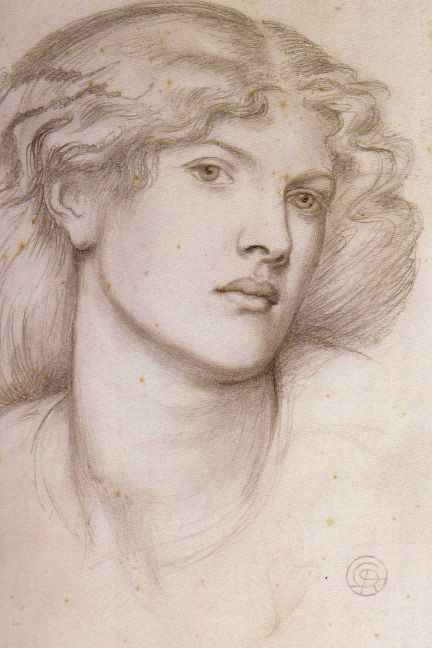
- Fanny Cornforth by Dante Gabriel Rossetti c 1865 Pencil on paper
- Born: Sarah Cox; 3 January 1835; Steyning, Sussex, England
- Died: 24 February 1909 (aged 74); Graylingwell Hospital, Chichester, England
- Known for: Model (art), Housekeeper (servant)
- Notable work: Portrayed by Rossetti many times in pencil on paper; less frequently in red chalk (sanguine), 1860s and 1870s. Also model for Edward Burne-Jones and J. R. Spencer Stanhope.
- Movement: Pre-Raphaelites

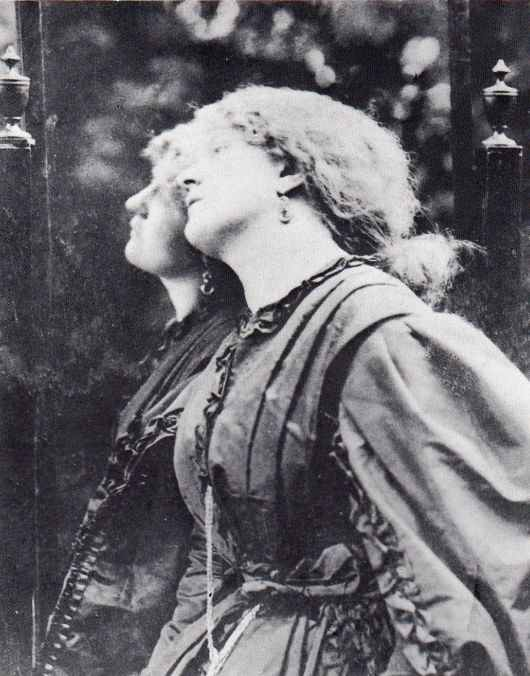
Photograph of Fanny Cornforth, 1863

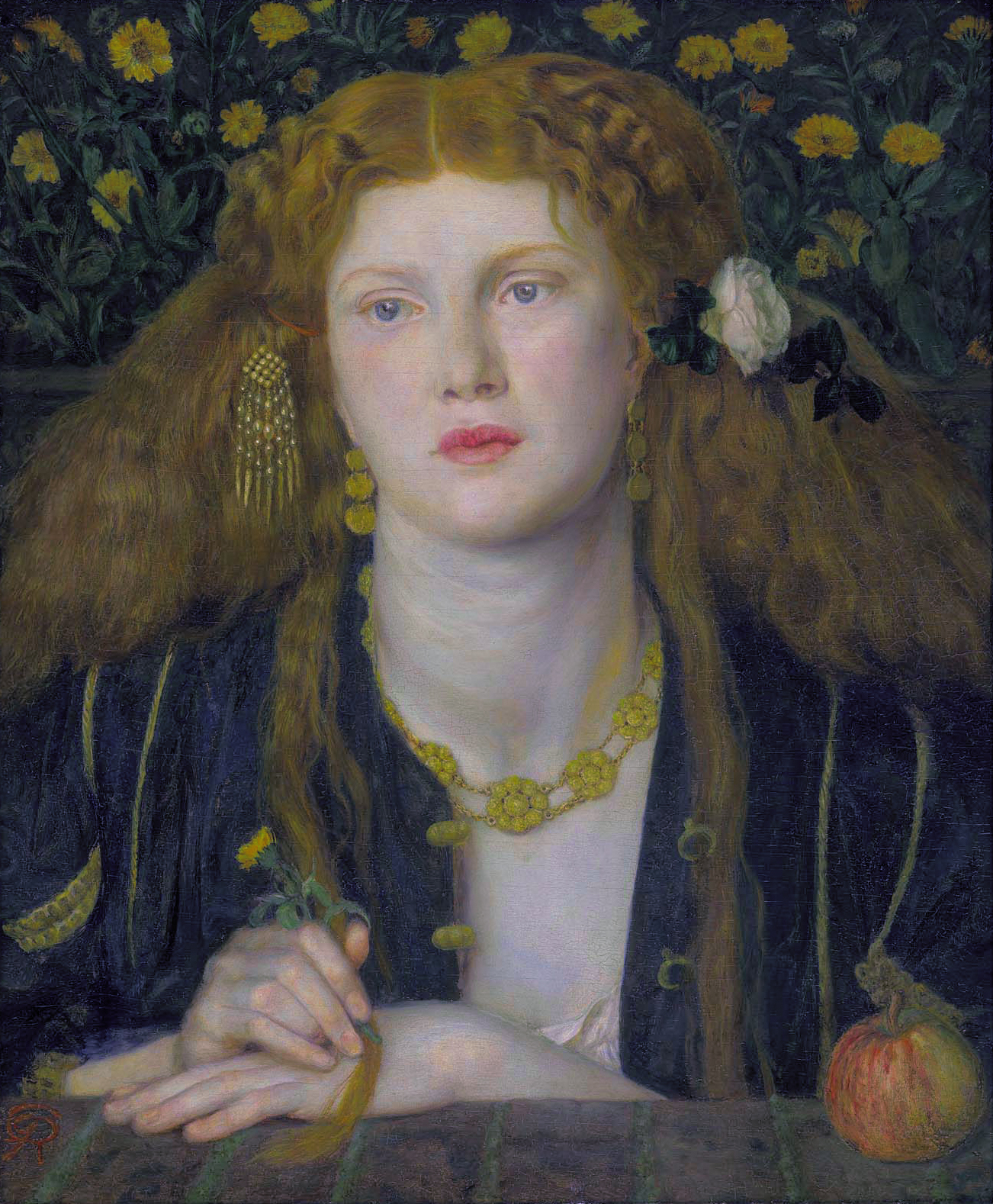
Bocca Baciata, 1859

Fanny Cornforth (born Sarah Cox; 3 January 1835 – 24 February 1909) was an English artist's model, and the mistress and muse of the Pre-Raphaelite painter Dante Gabriel Rossetti. Cornforth performed the duties of housekeeper for Rossetti. In Rossetti's paintings, the figures modelled by Fanny Cornforth are generally rather voluptuous, differing from those of other models such as Alexa Wilding, Jane Morris and Elizabeth Siddal.

== Biography ==
=== Early life ===
Cornforth, born Sarah Cox, on 3 January 1835, at Steyning, Sussex, was the daughter of Jane, née Woolgar (bap. 1814, d. 1847) and William Cox (bap. 1814, d. 1859), a journeyman blacksmith. She was baptised on 1 February 1835.

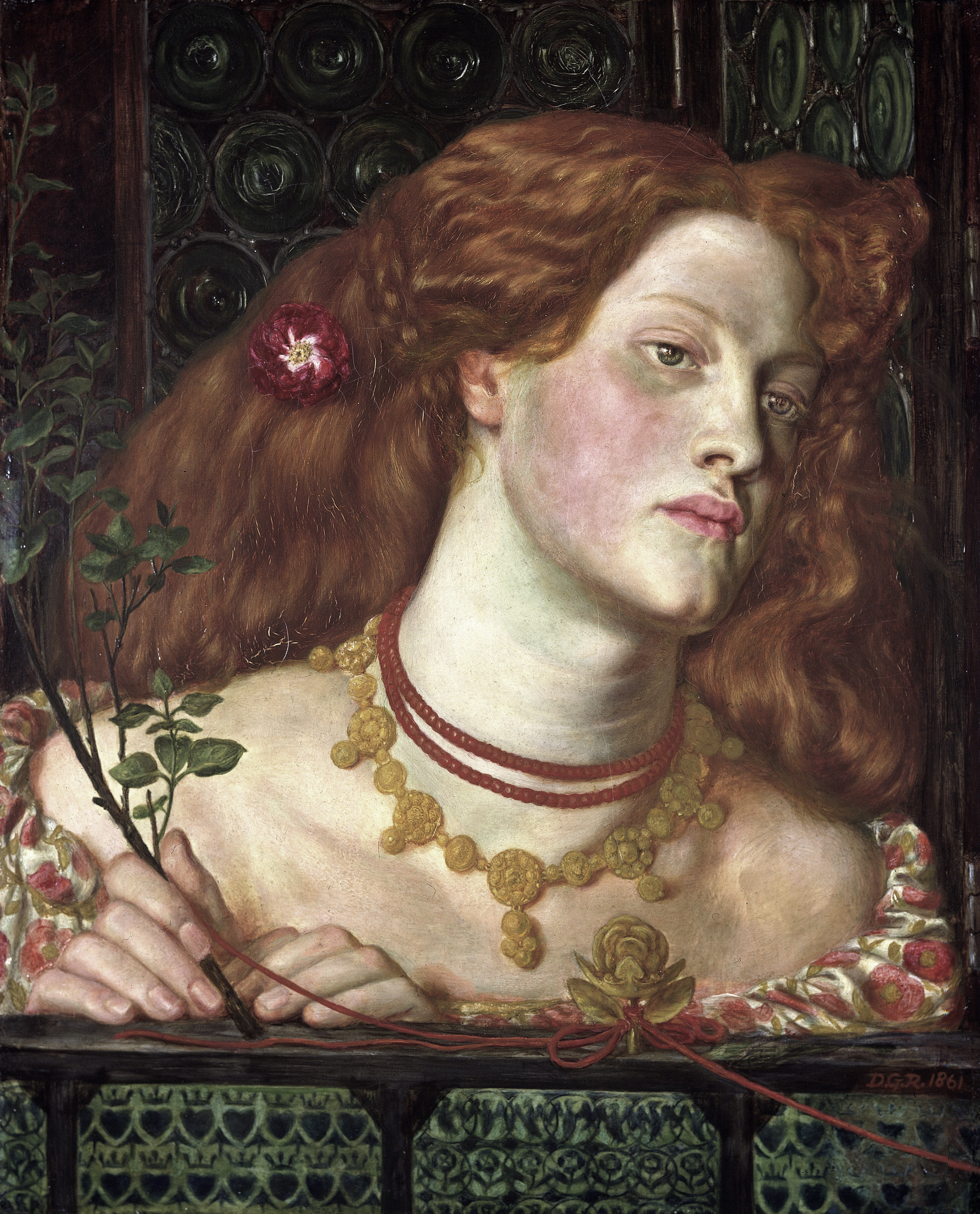
Fair Rosamund, by Rossetti, modelled by Fanny Cornforth, 1861

She was a general servant in the household of James and Louisa Worger, who had teenage children.

=== Relationship with Rossetti ===
Cornforth met Rossetti in 1857, when she was probably working as a prostitute. She became his model and mistress in the absence of Elizabeth Siddal whom Rossetti married in 1860. Many biographers presumed Siddal disliked Cornforth, but there is no proof that Siddal even knew of her existence. Cornforth's first role was as to model the head of the principal figure in the painting Found, which she later described, saying he "put my head against the wall and drew it for the head of the calf picture".

Three months after Rossetti's wedding, Cornforth married mechanic Timothy Hughes, but the relationship was short lived. The couple separated. It is not known for certain when she adopted the name "Fanny Cornforth", but Cornforth was the name of her first husband's stepfather.

After Siddal's death in 1862, Cornforth moved into the widowed Rossetti's home as his housekeeper. The affair between them lasted until Rossetti's death. For much of the time Rossetti was engaged in an off-and-on relationship with Jane Morris who was married to his colleague, William Morris. Their relationship was not made public but his relationship with Cornforth was.

Cornforth came from the lower/rural working class of English society. Her coarse accent and lack of education shocked Rossetti's friends and family. Rossetti's brother William Michael Rossetti praised her beauty, but said "she had no charm of breeding, education, or intellect". Many never accepted her and pressured Rossetti to end the affair. Over the course of their relationship, Cornforth gained weight. Much has been made of this by biographers, but the growing girths of both Rossetti and Cornforth was a mutual joke. His pet name for her was "My Dear Elephant" and she called him "Rhino". When they were apart, he drew cartoons of elephants and sent them to her, often signing himself "Old Rhinoceros".

After Rossetti's health started to decline seriously, his family became more directly involved in his life. Cornforth was forced to leave Rossetti's house in 1877. Rossetti paid for a house for her nearby, writing to her "You are the only person whom it is my duty to provide for, and you may be sure I should do my utmost as long as there was a breath in my body or a penny in my purse." He gave her several of his paintings, ensuring that her legal ownership was documented.

=== Second marriage ===
Cornforth's estranged husband died in 1872. While separated from Rossetti, she became involved with John Schott, a publican from a family of actors. Schott divorced his first wife, who was already living in a bigamous marriage with another man, to marry her. He married Fanny almost immediately after the divorce, in November 1879. The couple ran the Rose tavern in Jermyn Street, Westminster, London. Cornforth nevertheless repeatedly returned to Rossetti to nurse him, accompanying him to Cumbria in 1881. After Rossetti's death, she and her husband opened a Rossetti gallery in 1883 to sell some of the works she owned. Her husband John died in 1891, after which she lived with her stepson Frederick. During this period she was visited by Rossetti collector Samuel Bancroft, who was able to buy paintings and other memorabilia from her. Her correspondence with Bancroft is held as part of the collection at the Delaware Art Museum.

=== Final years ===
After the death of her stepson in 1898, she moved back to Sussex to stay with her husband's family. By 1905 she was apparently suffering from dementia, and was being cared for by her sister-in-law, the actress Rosa Villiers, who put her in the Workhouse in West Sussex against her will. On 30 March 1907 she was admitted to the West Sussex County Lunatic Asylum, the records of which state that she was suffering from "senile mania, confusion, weak-mindedness and an inability to sustain a rational conversation, a poor memory and sleeplessness." She remained at the asylum for the rest of her life. After a fall that broke her arm in September 1907 she began to decline and contracted bronchitis in September 1908. On 24 February 1909 she died of pneumonia aged 74. She was buried in the district cemetery in a common grave paid for by the asylum. The discovery about her final days was first made at West Sussex Record Office by Christopher Whittick, the biographer of Fanny Cornforth for the Oxford Dictionary of National Biography (ODNB). Shortly afterwards, Kirsty Stonell Walker, the author of Stunner: The Fall and Rise of Fanny Cornforth, found similar.

== Role of Fanny Cornforth in Pre-Raphaelite art ==
She sat for circa 60 oils, watercolours, pastels or pencil drawings by Rossetti. These include:

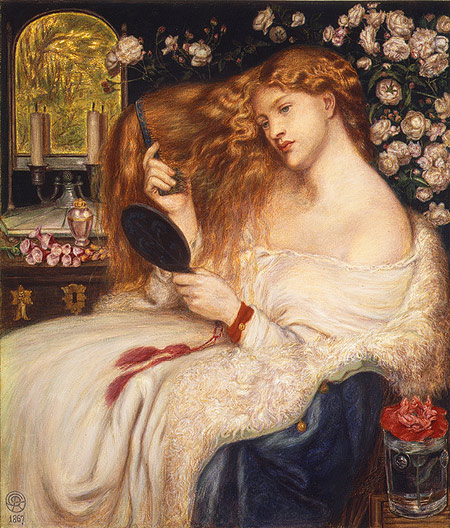
Lady Lilith, 1867.

- Bocca Baciata, by Rossetti (1859);
- Fanny Cornforth, graphite on paper (1859);
- Lucrezia Borgia, by Rossetti (1861);
- Fair Rosamund (1861);
- Fazio's Mistress (Aurelia) (1863–1873);
- The Blue Bower (1865);
- Lady Lilith (1867), first version. In 1873, her features were replaced by those of Alexa Wilding;
- Found (1869), unfinished.

A small circular oil painting, 9 3/4 inches in diameter, made in 1862 by Rossetti and now at the Royal Academy, London, is unusual in that it presents a straightforward portrait of Cornforth.

Rossetti substituted the features of another model, Alexa Wilding for Fanny Cornforth in Lady Lilith (1864–1868).

A few fine finished coloured chalk portraits include one drawn in 1874 on pale green paper, 22 x 16 in. Birmingham Museum & Art Gallery. Rossetti Archive S309.

The Rossetti Archive has images of a large proportion of these.

Works by other artists for which Cornforth sat include:

- Sidonia von Bork, by Edward Burne-Jones, 1860.

== Locations of likenesses ==
Locations of some of the recorded likenesses of Fanny Cornforth:

- D. G. Rossetti, portrait, 1859, Museum of Fine Arts, Boston
- D. G. Rossetti, drawing, c.1860, Ashmolean Museum, Oxford
- D. G. Rossetti, portrait, 1865, Barber Institute of Fine Arts, Birmingham
- D. G. Rossetti, portrait, 1870, Birmingham Museum and Art Gallery
- E. Burne-Jones, portrait
- J. R. S. Stanhope, portrait
- Photograph, University of Manchester Library, Charles Fairfax Murray collection, MS 1282 photographs 3
- Photograph, Delaware Art Museum, Wilmington
- Photographs, National Portrait Gallery, London

== Bibliography ==
- Daly, Gay (1989). Pre-Raphaelites in Love. New York: Ticknor & Fields. ISBN 0-89919-450-8.
- Marsh, Jan (1998) [1985]. Pre-Raphaelite Sisterhood. London: Quartet Books. ISBN 978-0-7043-0169-6.
- Stonell Walker, Kirsty (2006). Stunner : The Fall and Rise of Fanny Cornforth. USA: Lulu Publishing.
- Drewery, Anne (2001). Re-presenting Fanny Cornforth: The makings of an historical identity. UK: With Julian Moore & Christopher Whittick, in The British Art Journal 2001:3.
- Rossetti, Dante Gabriel (1940). Letters to Fanny Cornforth. Baltimore: Johns Hopkins Press; Baum, Paull F (editor).
