= Charles Augustus Howell =

English art dealer

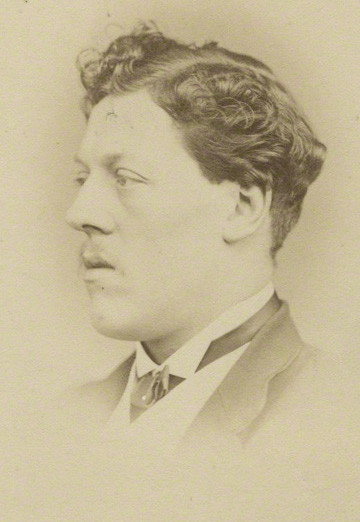
- Photograph of Howell by Elliott & Fry, 1860s
- Born: 10 March 1840; Porto, Kingdom of Portugal
- Died: 21 April 1890 (aged 50); Chelsea, London, England
- Occupation: Art dealer
- Partner: Rosa Corder

Charles Augustus Howell (10 March 1840 – 21 April 1890) was a Portuguese-British art dealer and alleged blackmailer who is best known for persuading the poet Dante Gabriel Rossetti to dig up the poems he buried with his wife Elizabeth Siddal. His reputation as a blackmailer inspired Arthur Conan Doyle's Sherlock Holmes story "The Adventure of Charles Augustus Milverton".

== Life ==
Howell was born in Porto, Portugal to an English father, Alfred William Hervey Howell, and a Portuguese mother. He claimed to have aristocratic Portuguese ancestry and would wear a red ribbon of the Portuguese Order of Christ, which he proclaimed to be an inherited family order. He moved to Britain in his youth, allegedly after having been caught cheating at cards.

In 1858, Howell left Britain shortly before his friend Felice Orsini attempted to assassinate Napoleon III, leading to rumours that Howell was involved in the plot. He returned in 1864.

Howell was the friend and business agent of both Rossetti and John Ruskin. Ruskin employed him as a secretary between 1865 and 1868. Ruskin trusted Howell with "affairs needing delicate handling and a wise discretion". This was usually to manage Ruskin's discreet charitable donations. But Howell sought increasingly to obtain complete control of Ruskin's finances. Eventually Edward Burne-Jones persuaded Ruskin to sever his connection with Howell.

According to Rossetti's brother William Michael Rossetti, Howell was a skilful salesman "with his open manner, his winning address, with his exhaustless gift of amusing talk, not innocent of high colouring and actual blague – Howell was unsurpassable". His ability to exploit people's "hobbies and weaknesses" secured Rossetti several commissions. Howell organised the exhumation of Dante Gabriel Rossetti's wife Elizabeth Siddal and the retrieval of the poems that he had left in her coffin in 1869. He was able to do this because he knew the then Home Secretary, Henry Bruce, who granted permission for it to be done. Rossetti insisted that the exhumation be kept absolutely secret.

Howell also became a business adviser to Algernon Swinburne, becoming "not only his man of business but also the partner of his amusements and the recipient of his confidences". Some "burlesque and indecent letters" which Swinburne wrote to Howell were somehow acquired by George Redway, a publisher, who used them to blackmail Swinburne into giving up the copyright of one of his poems. Swinburne blamed Howell, and after his death wrote that he hoped he was "in that particular circle of Malebolge where the coating of eternal excrement makes it impossible to see whether the damned dog's head is or is not tonsured".

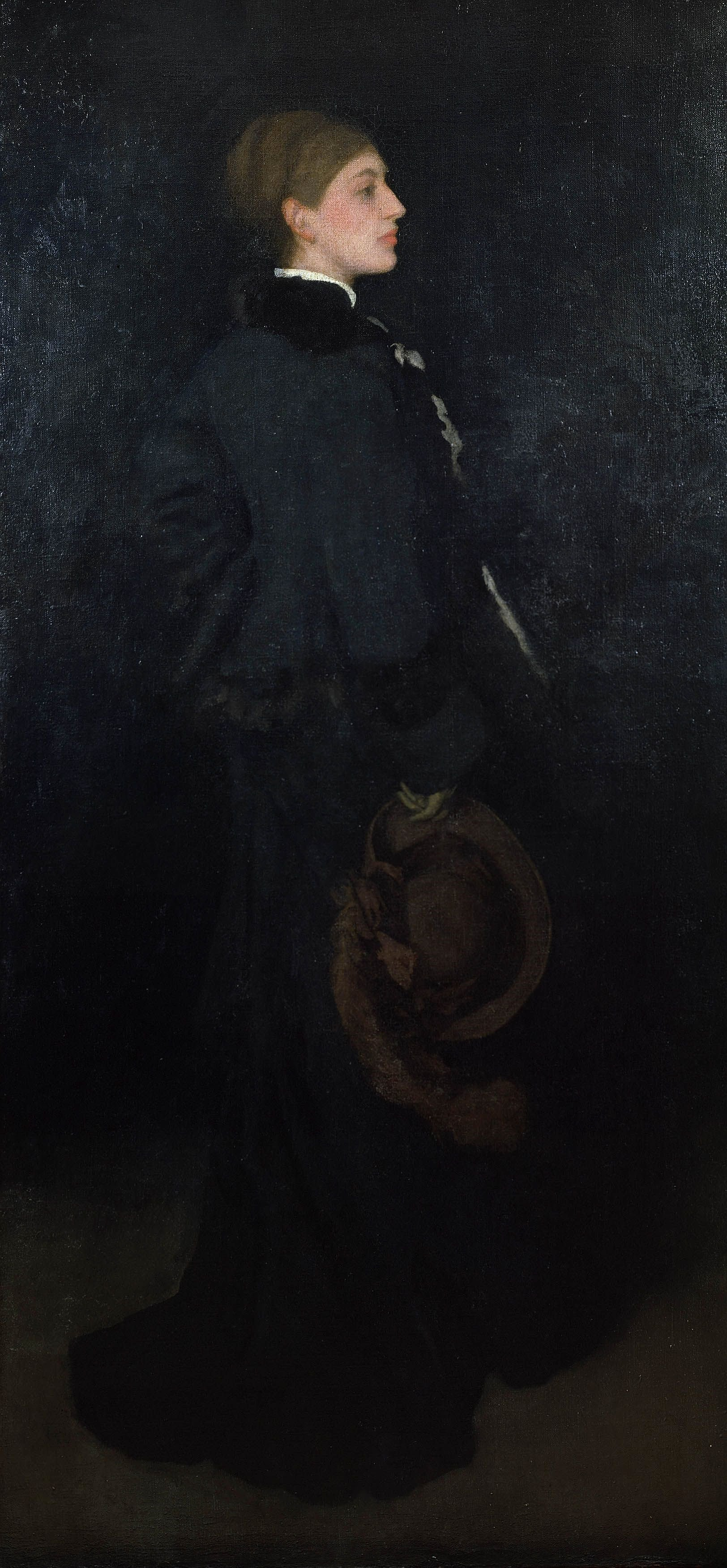
James McNeill Whistler, Arrangement in Brown and Black: Portrait of Rosa Corder, 1876–78, Frick Collection

Howell's connection with the Rossetti family is said to have ended when he was alleged to have persuaded his lover Rosa Corder to create fake Rossetti drawings. In 1883, Corder gave birth to Howell's daughter, who was christened Beatrice Ellen Howell.

In the late 1880s, he joined the Order of the White Rose, a Neo-Jacobite society, along with James Abbott McNeill Whistler.

== Death ==
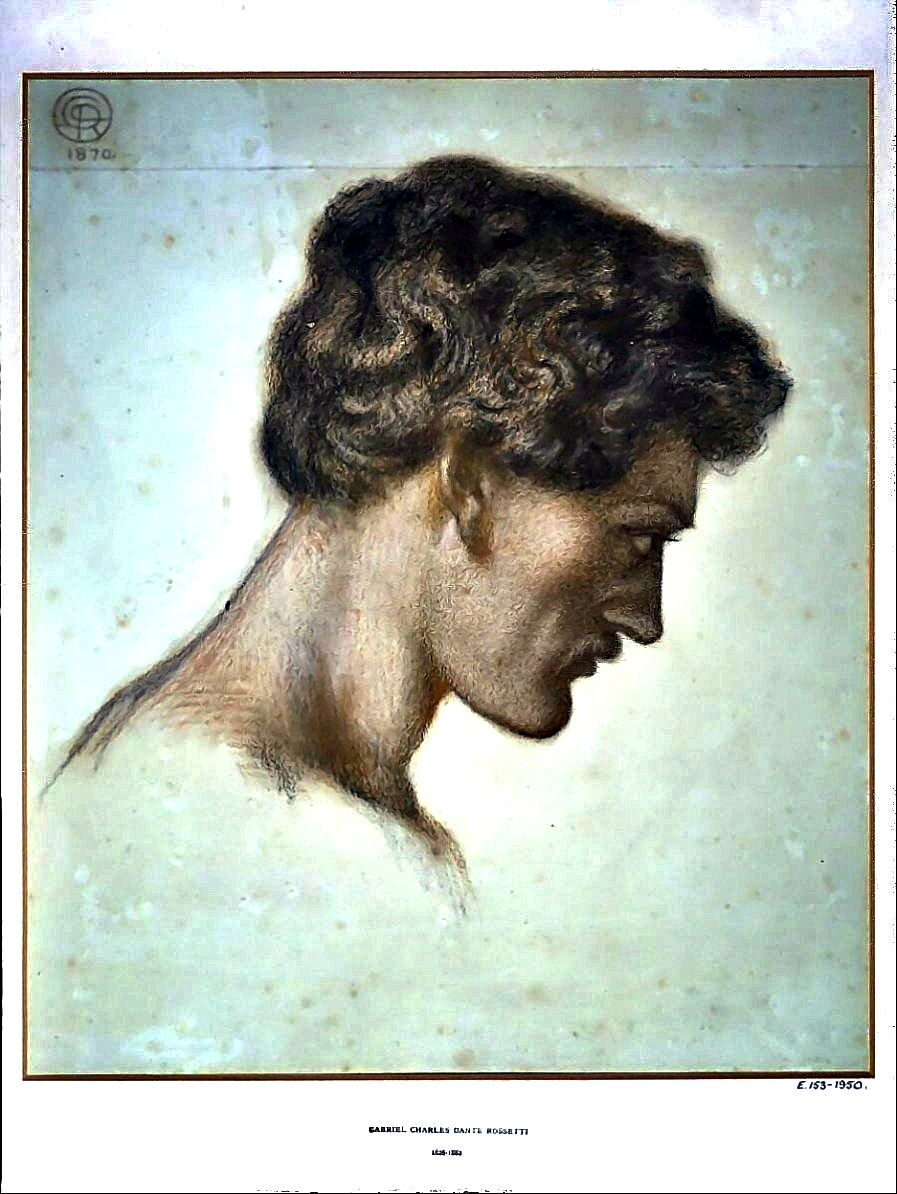
Charles Augustus Howell, drawn by Rossetti, 1870

Howell died in 1890 under strange circumstances. He was found close to a Chelsea public house with his throat slit, with a coin in his mouth – either a sovereign or half-sovereign. The presence of the coin was believed to be a criticism of those guilty of slander. Reports are inconsistent about whether or not he was found already dead or died in the hospital to which he was taken. The embarrassment of an inquest and police investigation was avoided when his death was ruled to have resulted from "pneumonic phthisis", the slit throat having been inflicted perimortem or posthumously. Numerous, carefully filed, letters from high-placed people were found at his home, leading to much speculation.

== Reputation ==
A caricature of Howell eavesdropping, while Rosa Corder forges Rossetti drawings (from Rossetti and his Circle by Max Beerbohm)

The circumstances of Howell's death and the many rumours about his dishonesty and double dealings led to the accusation that he had used letters in his possession to blackmail prominent persons. His associates in the art world were divided. Edward Burne-Jones described Howell as "a base, treacherous, unscrupulous and malignant fellow". Hall Caine called him a "soldier of fortune" and Algernon Charles Swinburne said he was "the vilest wretch I ever came across". Other artists were more generous. Ford Madox Brown said that though he was "one of the biggest liars in existence" and "half mad", he was essentially "good natured". Whistler said he was a "wonderful man... genius... splendidly flamboyant".

20th century commentators on the Pre-Raphaelites claimed that in his later years Howell used letters to blackmail former friends. In the words of Humphrey Hare, "Fallen on hard days, Howell did not hesitate to blackmail by the threatened sale of letters which contained the customary puerile indecencies". However, his biographer, Helen Rossetti Angeli, could find nothing to support the accusations of blackmail, which possibly arose from extrapolations of the incident involving George Redway.

Howell's reputation as a blackmailer was the inspiration for the Sherlock Holmes story "Charles Augustus Milverton". Howell was also the basis of the character De Castro in Theodore Watts-Dunton's novel Aylwin.
