= Beata Beatrix =

Painting by Dante Gabriel Rossetti

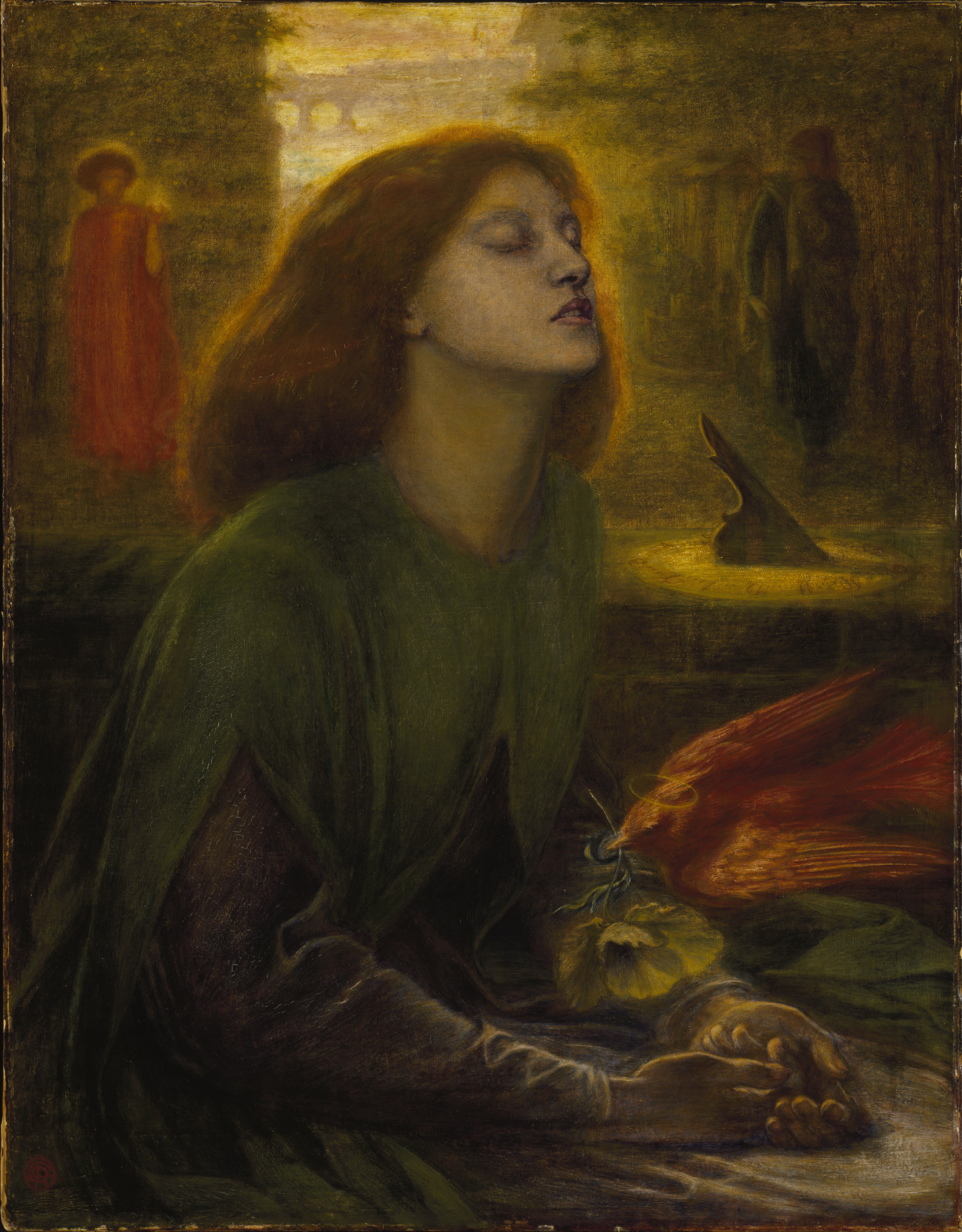
- Artist: Dante Gabriel Rossetti
- Year: c. 1864–1870
- Medium: Oil on canvas
- Dimensions: 86.4 cm × 66 cm (34 in × 26 in)
- Location: Tate Britain, London

Beata Beatrix
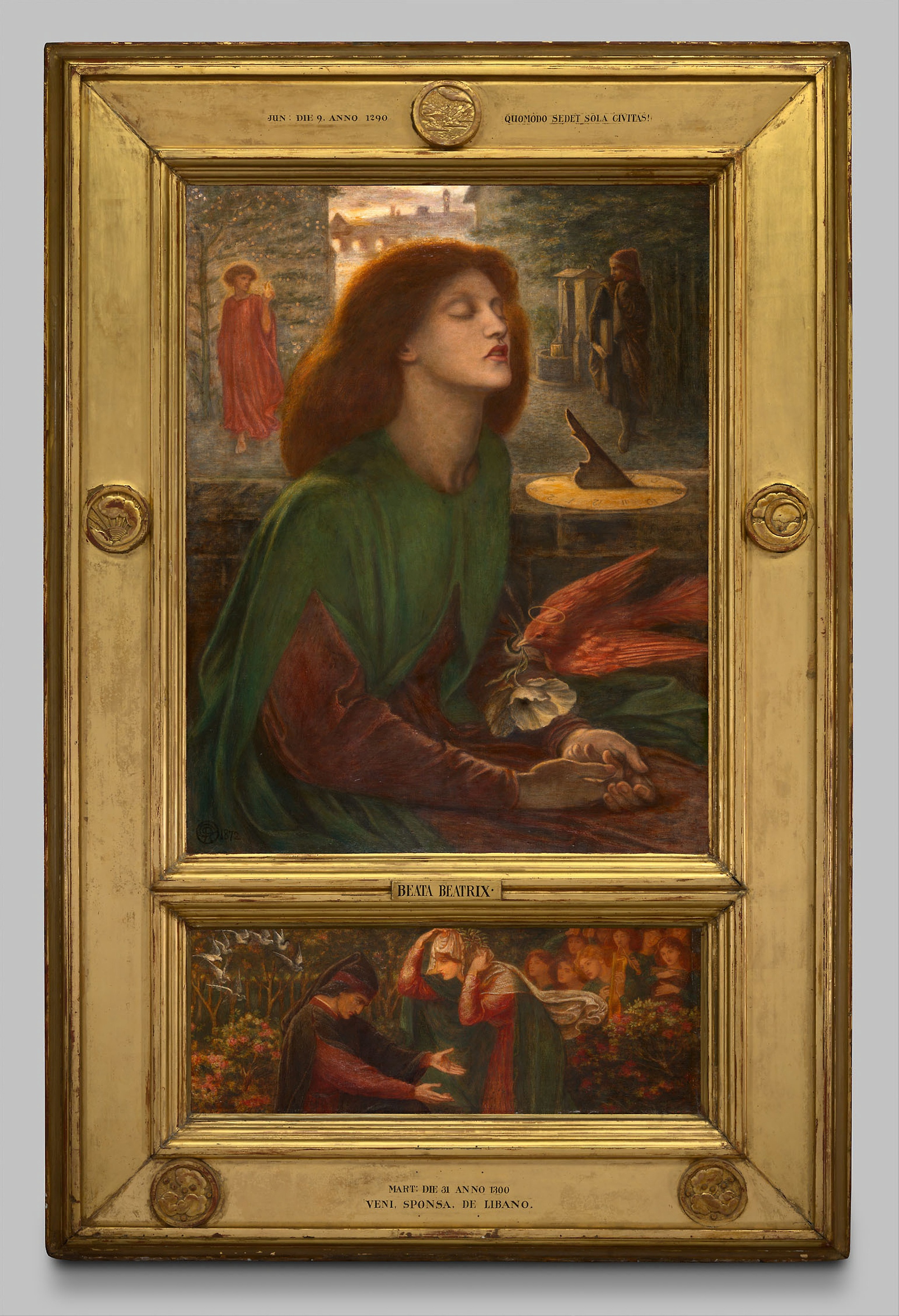
- Artist: Dante Gabriel Rossetti
- Year: c. 1871–1872
- Medium: Oil on canvas
- Dimensions: 87.5 cm × 69.3 cm (34 7/16 in × 27 1/4 in); [predella: 26.5 cm × 69.2 cm].
- Location: Art Institute of Chicago, Chicago

Beata Beatrix is a painting completed in several versions by Pre-Raphaelite artist Dante Gabriel Rossetti. The painting depicts Beatrice Portinari from Dante Alighieri's 1294 poem La Vita Nuova, at the moment of her death. The first version is in oil on canvas, completed in 1870.

== Painting ==
The painting's title in English translates as Blessed Beatrice. La Vita Nuova was a story that Rossetti had found of interest from childhood and he had begun work translating it into English in 1845 and published it in his work The Early Italian Poets.

Rossetti modelled Beatrice after his deceased wife and frequent model, Elizabeth Siddal, who had died in 1862. The painting was created from the numerous drawings that Rossetti had made of Siddal during their time together. The symbolism in the painting of a red dove, a messenger of love, suggests Rossetti's love for Siddal, with the white poppy representing laudanum, the means of her death. Several of Siddal's friends found the painting bore little resemblance to the drawings of her—the facial features were harder and the neck is out of proportion.

In an 1873 letter to his friend William Morris, Rossetti said he intended the painting "not as a representation of the incident of the death of Beatrice, but as an ideal of the subject, symbolized by a trance or sudden spiritual transfiguration."

Beata Beatrix is one of Rossetti's most recognised works and has caused Siddal's name frequently to be linked with Dante Alighieri's Beatrice.

This first painting is on display in the Tate Britain. It was a gift in memory of Francis, Baron Mount-Temple by his wife, Georgiana, in 1889.

== Other renditions by Rossetti ==
Rossetti was commissioned by William Graham to paint for him a version of Beata Beatrix, which Rossetti at first resisted. After stopping and starting the work, he grew to enjoy revisiting the theme, and altered the suffusion of light from the original, increasing background definition, and perhaps the idealisation of the subject. This oil on canvas painting, dated 1871–1872, is in the main slightly larger than the original and adds a predella (bottom panel) depicting Dante Alighieri and Beatrice meeting in paradise, the whole set within a frame designed by Rossetti. Gifted by Charles L. Hutchinson in the 1920s, it is on display at the Art Institute of Chicago.

Several other renditions were made by Rossetti of Beata Beatrix—a watercolour, a chalk drawing and another oil painting that was begun in 1877. The last painting was still unfinished at the time of his death, and his lifelong friend, Ford Madox Brown, completed it. In this painting, in contrast to the original, the bird flying towards Beatrice is a white dove holding red poppies in its beak. This painting is in Birmingham Museum and Art Gallery in England. An 1880 oil on canvas version is in the National Galleries of Scotland.

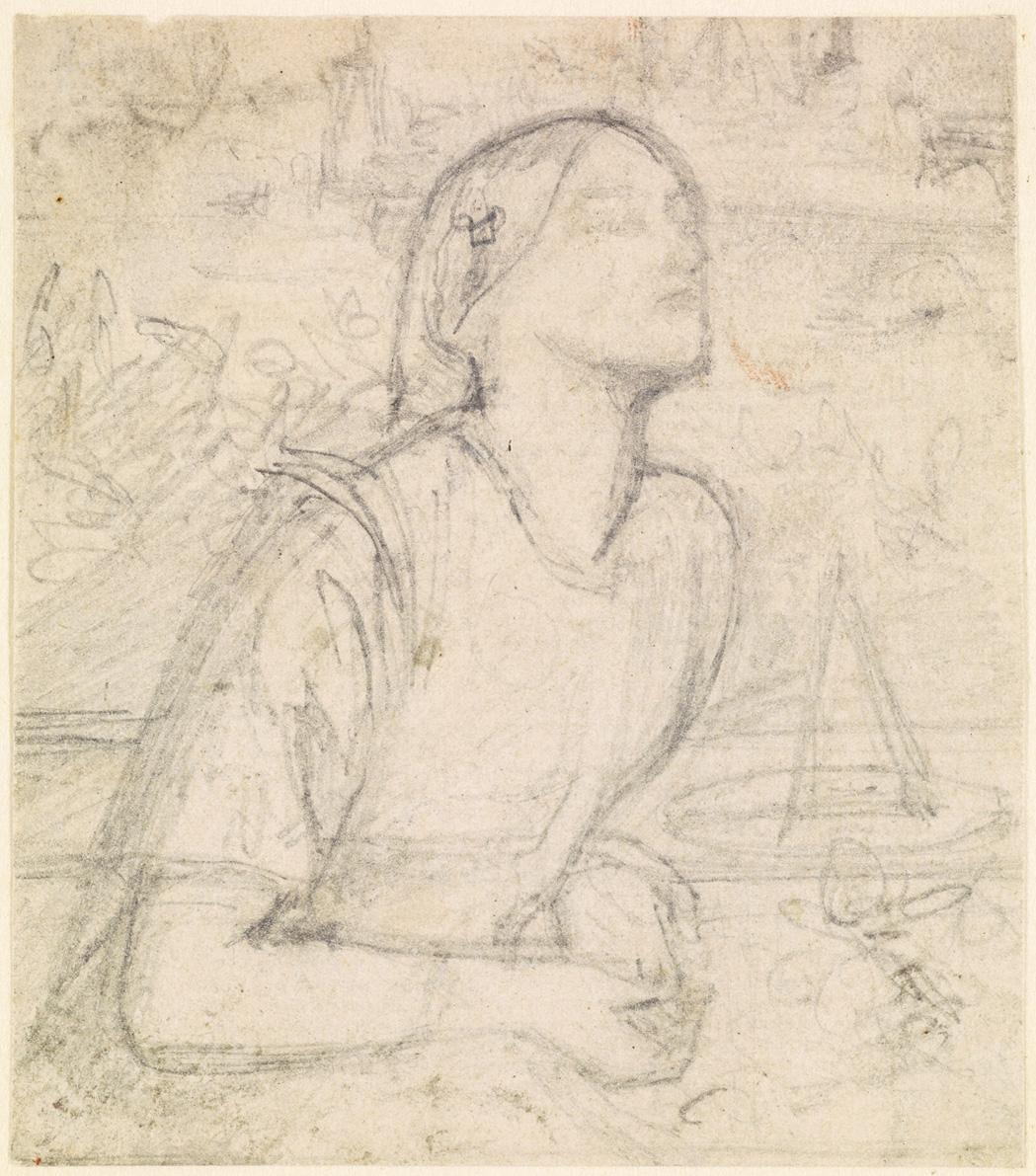
The painting's compositional sketch

== See also ==
- List of paintings by Dante Gabriel Rossetti
