= Theodore Watts-Dunton =

19th/20th-century English critic and poet

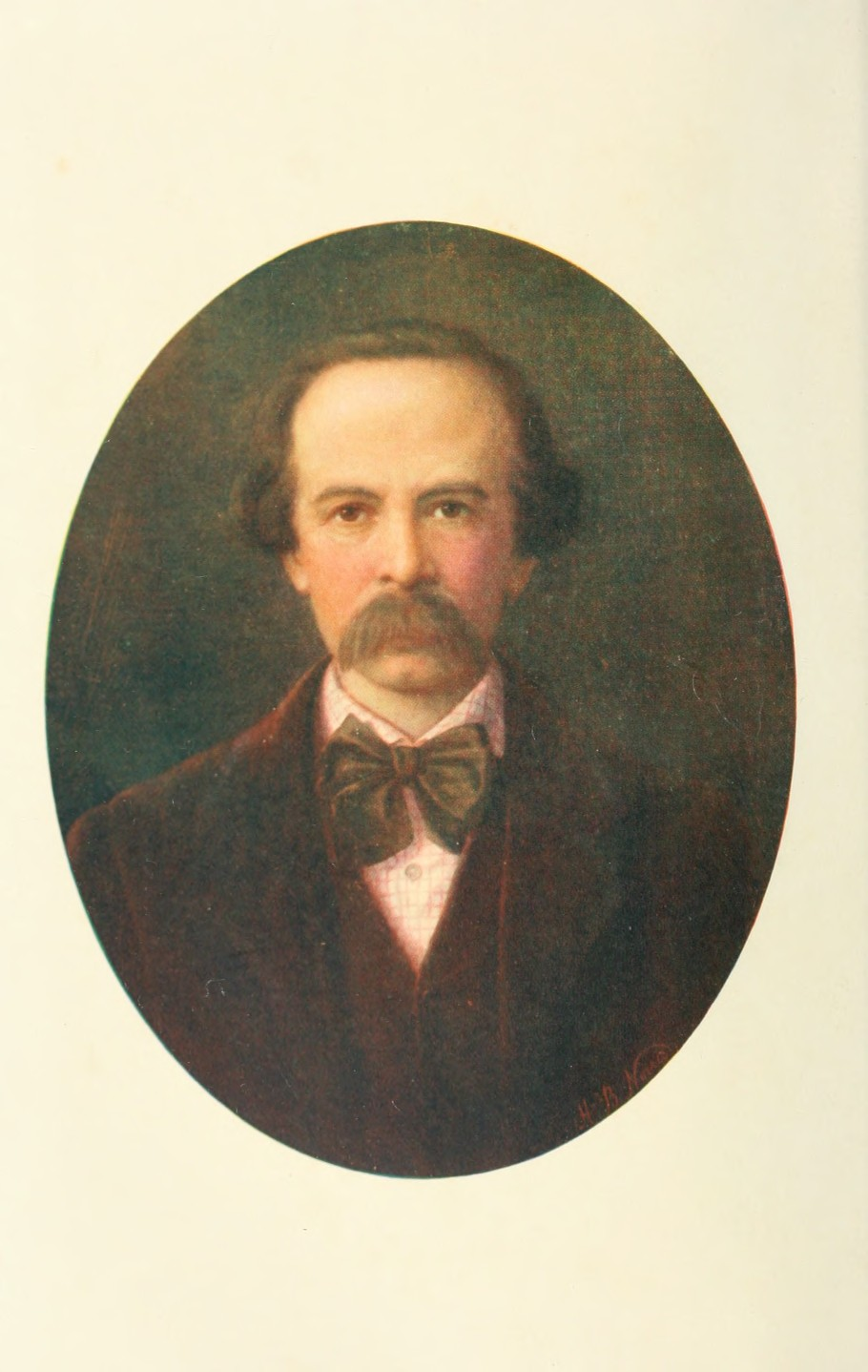
Theodore Watts-Dunton, from a painting by H. B. Norris

Theodore Watts-Dunton (12 October 1832 – 6 June 1914), from St Ives, Huntingdonshire, was an English poetry critic with major periodicals, and himself a poet. He is remembered particularly as the friend and minder of Algernon Charles Swinburne, whom he rescued from alcoholism and drug use and persuaded to continue writing.

== Birth and education ==
Walter Theodore Watts was born at St Ives, in what was then Huntingdonshire. He added his mother's maiden name Dunton to his surname in 1897. He was originally educated as a naturalist, and saw much of the East Anglian Gypsies, of whose superstitions and folklore he made careful study. Abandoning natural history for the law, he qualified as a solicitor and went to London, where he practised for some years, giving his spare time to his chosen pursuit of literature. One of his clients was Swinburne, whom he befriended in 1872.

== Literary contributions ==
Watts-Dunton contributed regularly to The Examiner from 1874 and to The Athenaeum from 1875 until 1898, being for more than twenty years the principal poetry critic in the latter. He wrote widely for other publications and contributed several articles to the Encyclopædia Britannica 9th edition (1885), of which the most significant was the one on "Poetry" in the ninth edition, where he explored poetry's first principles.

== Literary associations ==
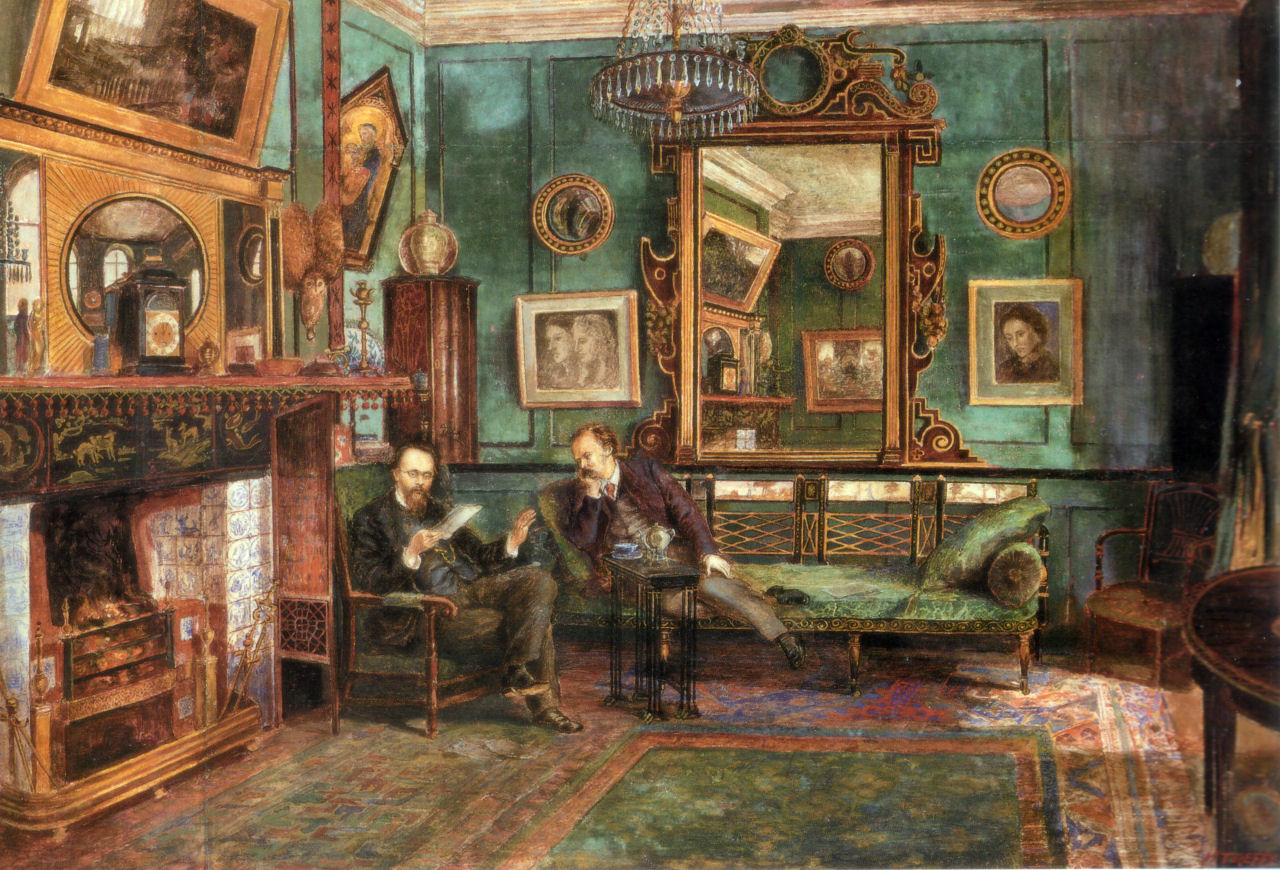
Rossetti and Watts-Dunton at 16 Cheyne Walk by Henry Treffry Dunn

Watts-Dunton had considerable influence as the friend of many of the leading men of letters of his time; he enjoyed the confidence of Tennyson and contributed an appreciation of him to the authorised biography. He was in later years Dante Gabriel Rossetti's most intimate friend (Rossetti made a portrait of Watts in pastel in 1874). In 1879 Swinburne's alcoholic dysentery so alarmed him that he moved the poet into his semi-detached home, The Pines, 11 Putney Hill, Putney, which they shared for nearly thirty years until Swinburne's death in 1909.

Watts' household included his sister Miranda Mason, her husband Charles (also a solicitor), her son, Bertie (born 1874) and later, a second sister. They also employed a live-in cook and a housemaid. Watts-Dunton married Clara Reich on 29 November 1905 and she settled into the family with ease.

== Swinburne and Dunn ==
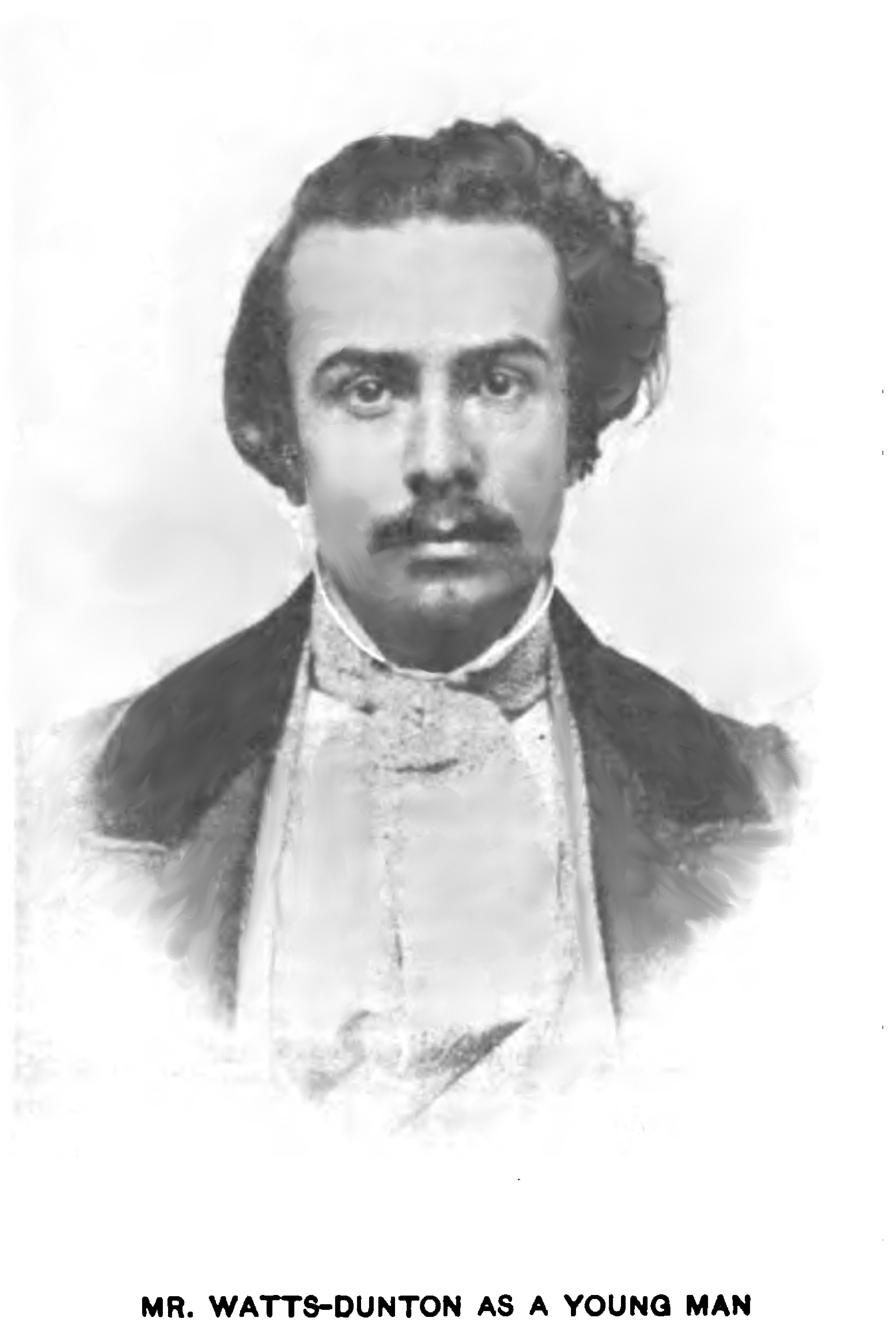
Theodore Watts as a young man

Watts is widely praised for extending Swinburne's life and encouraging his enthusiasm for the landscape verse that was amongst the best of his later works. However, Watts has also been castigated for sabotaging the completion of Swinburne's erotic sadomasochistic novel Lesbia Brandon. Even so, he was not able to wean Swinburne of his interest in flagellation.

Watts-Dunton later decided also to take in Henry Treffry Dunn, who had been one of Rossetti's assistants. Like Swinburne, Dunn was prone to alcoholism. He died in 1899 whilst still living with Watts-Dunton and Swinburne.

== Publications ==
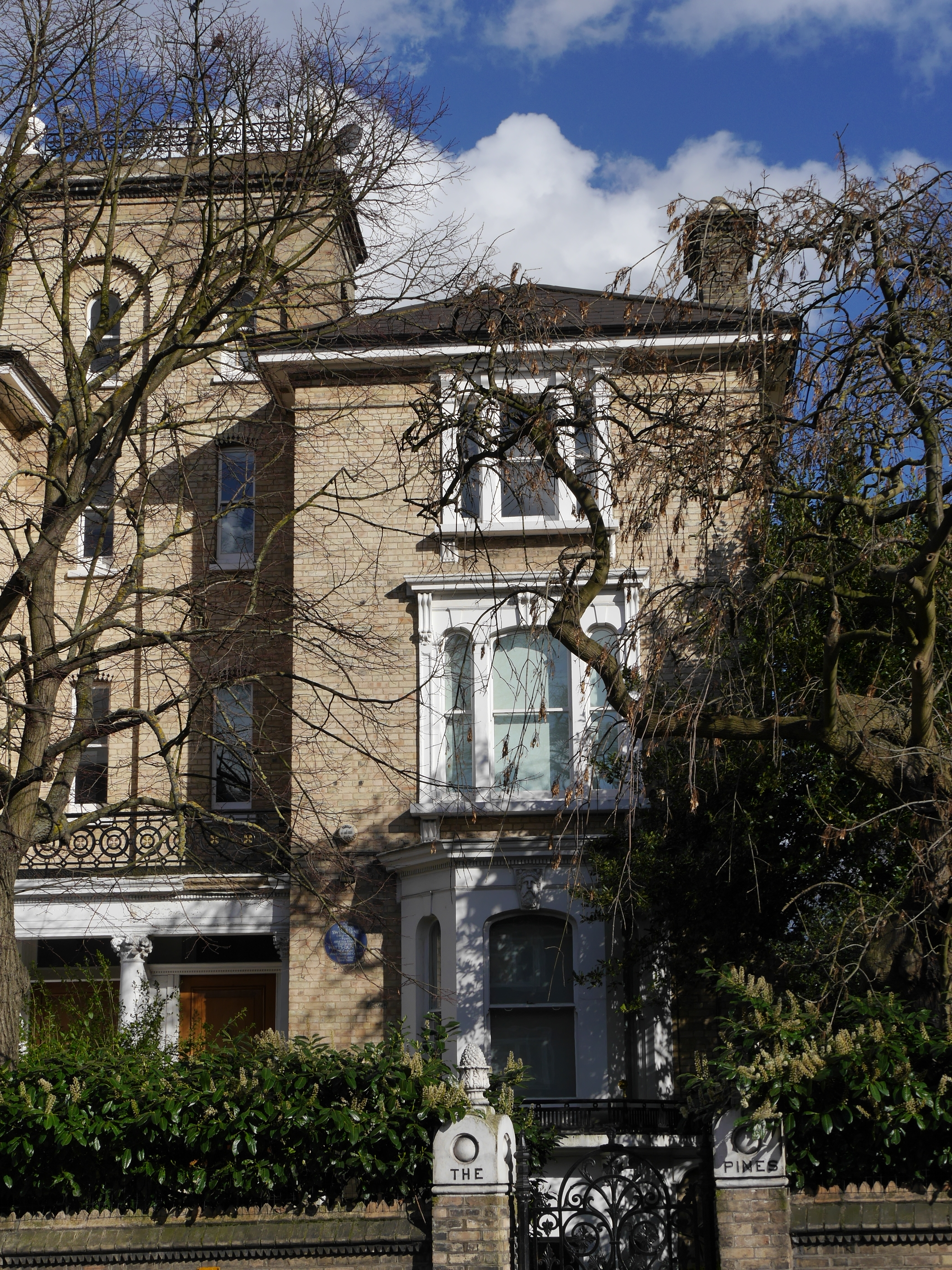
The Pines, Putney

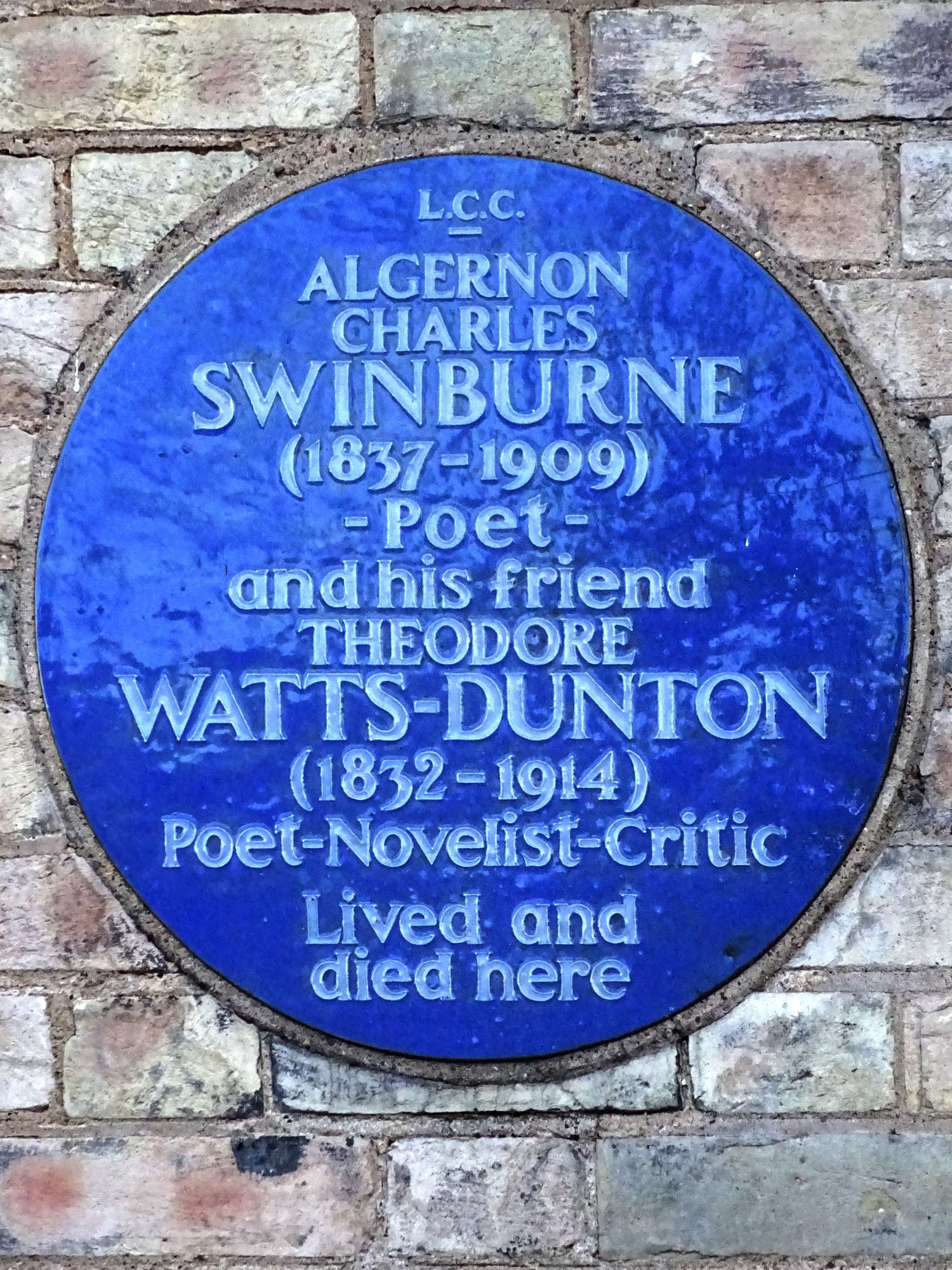
Blue plaque at The Pines, Putney

It was not until 1897 that Watts-Dunton published a poetry volume under his own name, albeit with the addition of his mother's maiden name. His erstwhile friend Whistler sent him a letter mocking his perceived aggrandisement: "Theodore," it read, "What's Dunton?" The book was his collection of poems called The Coming of Love, some of which he had printed previously in periodicals.

In the following year his prose romance Aylwin attained immediate success and ran through many editions in the course of a few months. The late 19th-century English novelist George Gissing noted in his diary in November 1898 that the novel had been "extravagantly praised", but that Gissing thought it showed a "dull mechanism". Both The Coming of Love and Aylwin set forth – the one in poetry, the other in prose – the romantic and passionate associations of Romany life, and maintain the traditions of George Borrow, whom Watts-Dunton had known well in his own youth. Imaginative glamour and mysticism are their prominent characteristics, and the novel in particular was credited with bringing pure romance back into public favour.

Watts-Dunton edited Borrow's Lavengro in 1893 and Romany Rye in 1903. In 1903 he also published The Renascence of Wonder, a treatise on the romantic movement. His Studies of Shakespeare appeared in 1910. But it was not only in his published work that Watts-Dunton's influence on the literary life of his time was potent. His long and intimate association with Rossetti and Swinburne made him a unique figure in the world of letters. His grasp of metrical principle and of the historic perspective of English poetry brought him respect as a literary critic.

Theodore Watts-Dunton died at The Pines, Putney, on 6 June 1914, and was survived by his wife, Clara (née Reich). He is buried at West Norwood Cemetery, where his monument is a low capped stone. A blue plaque marks his home in Putney.

== In popular culture ==
Watts-Dunton's elongated name was celebrated by Stephen Potter's book on Gamesmanship, in which the Dunton-Watts supercharger was merely a thrust in the motoring gamesman's ploy to get one up on the opponent. When faced with an equally adept car man, the gamesman could expect a riposte involving the inevitably superior Watson-Dunn supercharger.

== Works ==
- 'Poetry', Encyclopædia Britannica (9th edition), (1885) Vol. XIX
- The Coming of Love, (London: John Lane, 1897)
- Aylwin, (London: Hurst and Blackett, 1898) (film 1920)
- The Christmas Dream, (London: 1901)
- Christmas at the Mermaid, (London: John Lane, 1902, illustrated by Herbert Cole)
- The Renascence of Wonder, (London: 1903)
- Studies of Shakespeare, (London: 1910)
- Poetry and The Renascence of Wonder, (E. P. Dutton, 1914, facsimile ed. 2006)
- Old Familiar Faces, (London: 1916)

== Bibliography ==
- James Douglas, Theodore Watts-Dunton: Poet, Novelist, Critic (1904, repr. 1973)
- Max Beerbohm, 'No. 2 The Pines', And Even Now (London: Heinemann, 1920)
- Clara Watts-Dunton, The Home Life of Swinburne (London: Philpot, 1922)
- Mollie Panter-Downes, At the Pines: Swinburne and Watts-Dunton in Putney (Boston: Gambit, 1971) ISBN 0-87645-049-4
- Thomas Hake and Arthur Compton-Rickett, The Life and Letters of Theodore Watts Dunton (London: Jack, 1916; reproduced: Whitefish, MT: Kessinger Publishing, 2005) ISBN 1-4179-6143-0
