= Etheline E. Dell =

English artist (1865–1891)

Etheline Ella Dell
- Watercolor painting by Dell
- Born: 1865; England
- Died: July 1891; River Thames, England

Etheline Ella Dell (1865 – July 1891) was an English artist and illustrator active in the late Victorian era. She painted scenes of fairies, often surrounded by flowers and insects, and rural subjects. On her paintings, she sometimes signed her name Etheline E. Dell or E. E. Dell.

== Early life ==
Etheline Ella Dell was born in 1865 in England to parents Mary and John Henry Dell. Her father was listed in the census as a landscape artist. Her older sisters were Eveline I., Aline E., and Alice, and her younger siblings were Edna Adeline and Edgar Herbert. Dell lived in New Malden in Surrey.

== Career ==
Dell worked with watecolour, oils, and silverpoint to create scenes of fairies and rural life. She often illustrated and painted scenes inspired by Shakespeare's plays, including A Midsummer Night's Dream. Her fairy paintings would sometimes include oversized flowers and insects in the surrounding scene. The Royal Birmingham Society of Artists praised the accuracy of her depiction of insects, comparing them to entomological drawings.

By age 20, Dell was exhibiting in the Royal Academy of Arts. In 1885 and 1887, she exhibited her miniature paintings of fairies at the academy, two of which were around 4 inches in size. One of the works, despite its small size, included 21 fairies painted inside the scene.

In the late 1880s and early 1890s, her work continued to be exhibited in England, including at the Royal Institute of Painters in Water Colours, the Institute of Painters in Oil Colours, the Dudley Gallery, St. James's Gallery, and the Royal Birmingham Society of Artists.

At an 1890 exhibit with the Royal Birmingham Society of Artists, one of her works of fairies was compared to Joseph Noel Paton's work.

Dell illustrated multiple books, including Songs of Trust and Triumph (1891), Nobody's Business (1891), Pictures from Shelley (1891), and Told after Tea (c. 1892).

== Family and death ==
Dell's father died around 1888. She promised him on his deathbed to take care of her mother and younger sister, Edna, after he was gone.

Near the beginning of July in 1891, Dell and Thomas Bolas, a chemist, were engaged. Her fiancée said that around this time, Dell was still troubled by her father's death, and was interested in speaking about metaphysical topics.

Dell went missing on Sunday, 5 July 1891. Her body was found later that week in the River Thames. Near the river, Dell left behind her umbrella, hat, and a handwritten note that told the reader to "take care of my dear sister Edna if she needs it." An inquest was held, and her death was ruled a suicide. Those involved in the inquest theorized that, due to her upcoming marriage, she felt burdened by the belief that she would break her promise to her father.

She died at the age of 25, with her date of death recorded as 5 July 1891. Her brother became depressed after her death and, a month later, committed suicide by poison.

== Illustrated books ==
- Songs of Trust and Triumph (1891), written by Charlotte Murray
- Nobody's Business (1891), written by Edith Carrington
- Pictures from Shelley (1891), with drawings engraved by W. D. Cooper
- Told after Tea (1892), written by M. and C. Lee, co-illustrated with Edith Hume and H. Ford

== Gallery ==
The Tempest Act V Scene I (1887)

Midsummer Fairies

Fairies and a Field Mouse
