= The Bible in Spain =

Book by George Borrow, recounting his travels in 19th-century Spain

The Bible in Spain, published in London in 1843, is a travel book by the British writer George Borrow (1803–1881). It was a popular work when it appeared, running through several editions. Borrow tells of his travels through Spain while working as a Bible salesman in 1835–1838, during the Carlist Civil War. His activities on behalf of the Bible Society encountered much opposition from the Roman Catholic Church and from politicians.

== Content ==
Borrow's book, "a song of wild Spain", was based on journals and notes he kept at the time, upon which he also drew for his reports back to the Bible Society, which were returned to him on his request when he was working on the book. His travels began at Lisbon, from where he journeyed on horseback via Elvas and Badajoz to Madrid. There he negotiated with government ministers, including Prime Ministers Mendizábal and Istúriz, for permission to print and distribute a Spanish translation of the New Testament. In this he had the support of the British ambassador George Villiers.

Borrow went on to travel through northern Spain distributing copies of this work and appointing local agents where possible. On returning to Madrid he opened a bookshop for sale of the work, but this was soon closed by the authorities. He next printed his own translation of St. Luke's Gospel in the Caló language of the Iberian Romani people. He was briefly imprisoned in Madrid. During his Spanish travels he suffered from bouts of illness and twice returned to England, and in the end his activities were suppressed and he left Spain for Tangier, where the book closes.

The work relates numerous personal encounters Borrow had with Spaniards, from the prime minister to beggars, including Roma and crypto-Jews. This was the first widely read book with accurate first-hand information on Roma, although a more complete description appears in his first work, The Zincalí (1841), which was not a commercial success.

== Reception ==
The book brought money and recognition for Borrow. It went into six editions in the first year, one of which sold 10,000 copies within four months. It also sold well in the United States, and was translated into French and German. The book's popularity in Protestant countries at the time was presumably due to its evangelical enthusiasm, as well as the romantic image of Spain; whereas its continuing interest at the present time arises more from its powerful portrayal of a diversity of people, places and incidents.

A contemporary reviewer expected that readers would be "amused by the lively sketches... along with the author's odd adventures, and the queer positions in which he often placed himself". For this reviewer the book is "in the first rank of entertaining and even of informing books", although in Borrow's "off-hand, free-and-easy" encounters with a wide range of colourful characters he seems frequently to be pursuing an object at variance with "one that could be contemplated by a Bible Society's agent". Borrow's account in the book (Chapters 51–57) of his unscheduled expedition to Gibraltar and Tangier makes it "clear that he was pursuing a private agenda, a dream of discovery about Gypsies, Jews, and Moors."

For Edward Thomas (1912), Borrow presented himself in a heroic light, without vanity. Borrow's writing style in the book is "effective", conveying "half theatrical and wholly wild exuberance and robustness", even though it "runs at times to rotten Victorianism, both heavy and vague" and shows the influence of Biblical phraseology. Borrow often breaks up his own narrative with "life-like" dialogue that "can hardly be over-praised"; the effect is not marred by the many insertions of untranslated Spanish words and phrases. Thomas concludes that "as always for a good writer, the whole is greater than the mere sum of the parts."

Herbert Read, in his book English Prose Style (1928) cites Borrow's The Bible in Spain as an example of "the virtues of a good narrative style".

For the historian Raymond Carr (1966), Borrow's "strange masterpiece" is of especial historical value, against the shortage of "orthodox sources" for Spanish history at that period. This is seen, for example, in the "splendid eyewitness account" (on pp. 135–140) of the bravery of the military officer Vicente Genaro de Quesada in the face of a hostile crowd.

== Influence ==
The success of The Bible in Spain helped to promote public interest in Britain in the work of colporteurs, who distribute religious works, and this activity became a major focus for the Bible Society in the mid-19th century.

The description of Romani life in the final chapter of Prosper Mérimée's novella Carmen (the source for Bizet's opera) shows many similarities with those in Borrow's The Bible in Spain and The Zincali. Mérimée was familiar with Borrow's writings and commented on them.

In the Footsteps of George Borrow by Guy Arnold (ISBN 1904955371) is a travel book in which the author retraces the steps of Borrow's journey as related in The Bible in Spain.

According to Edward Weeks, in his Forward to Richard Soule's Dictionary of English Synonyms, James Hall, the co-author of The Bounty Trilogy, “…decided to make the voyage from Tahiti to Pitcairn Island…and knowing that he would have many days at sea, he took with him Borrow’s The Bible in Spain….”

Robert Louis Stevenson took The Bible in Spain with him on his Travels with a Donkey

== See also ==
- Bible translations into Spanish
- Protestantism in Spain
