= The Pines, Putney =

'Blue plaque' house in Putney, Wandsworth, London

Coordinates: 51.4601702°N 0.217401°W

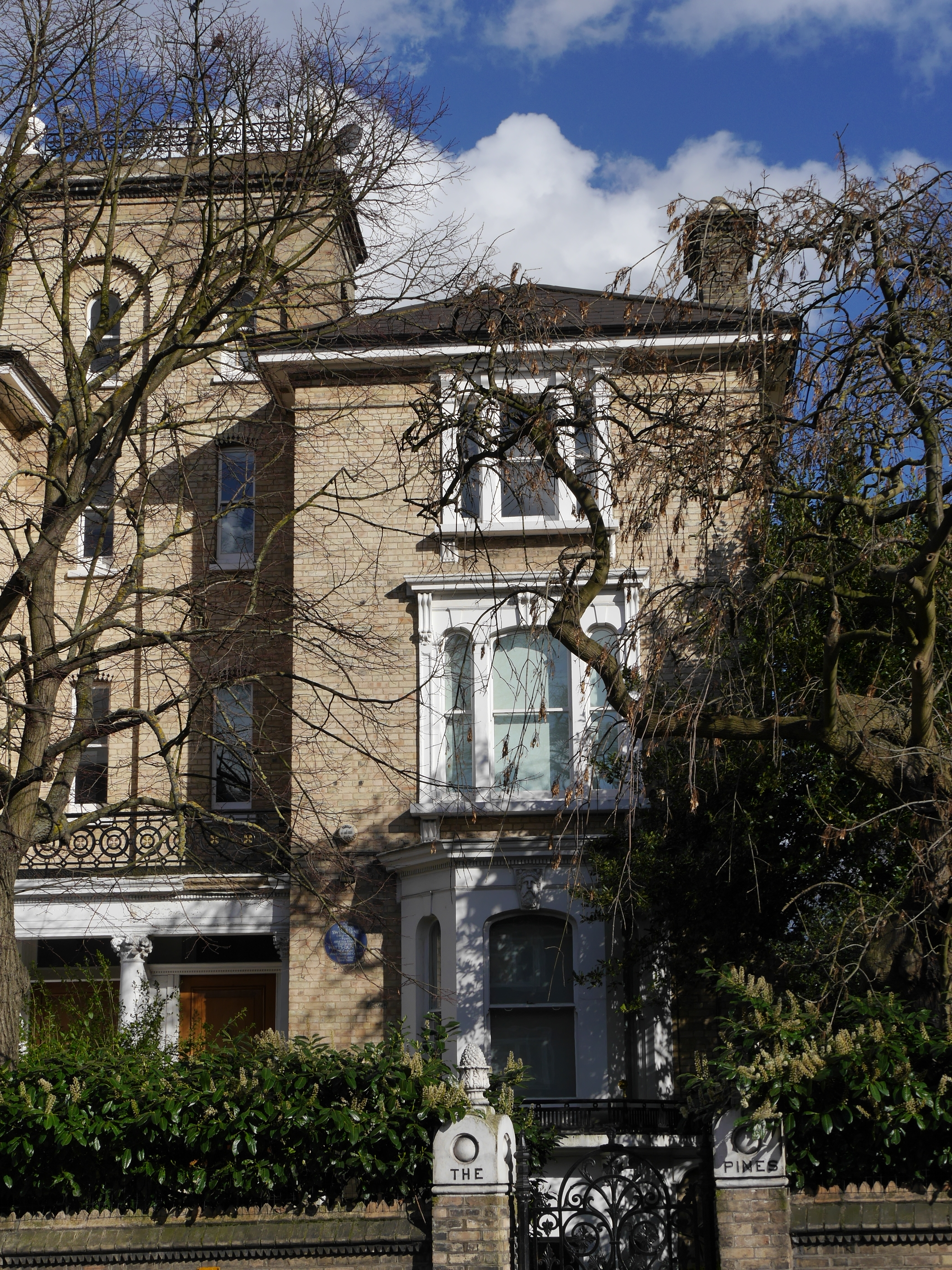
The Pines, Putney

The Pines is a Grade II listed house in Putney in the London Borough of Wandsworth, it was home to the poets Algernon Charles Swinburne and Theodore Watts-Dunton.

== Location ==
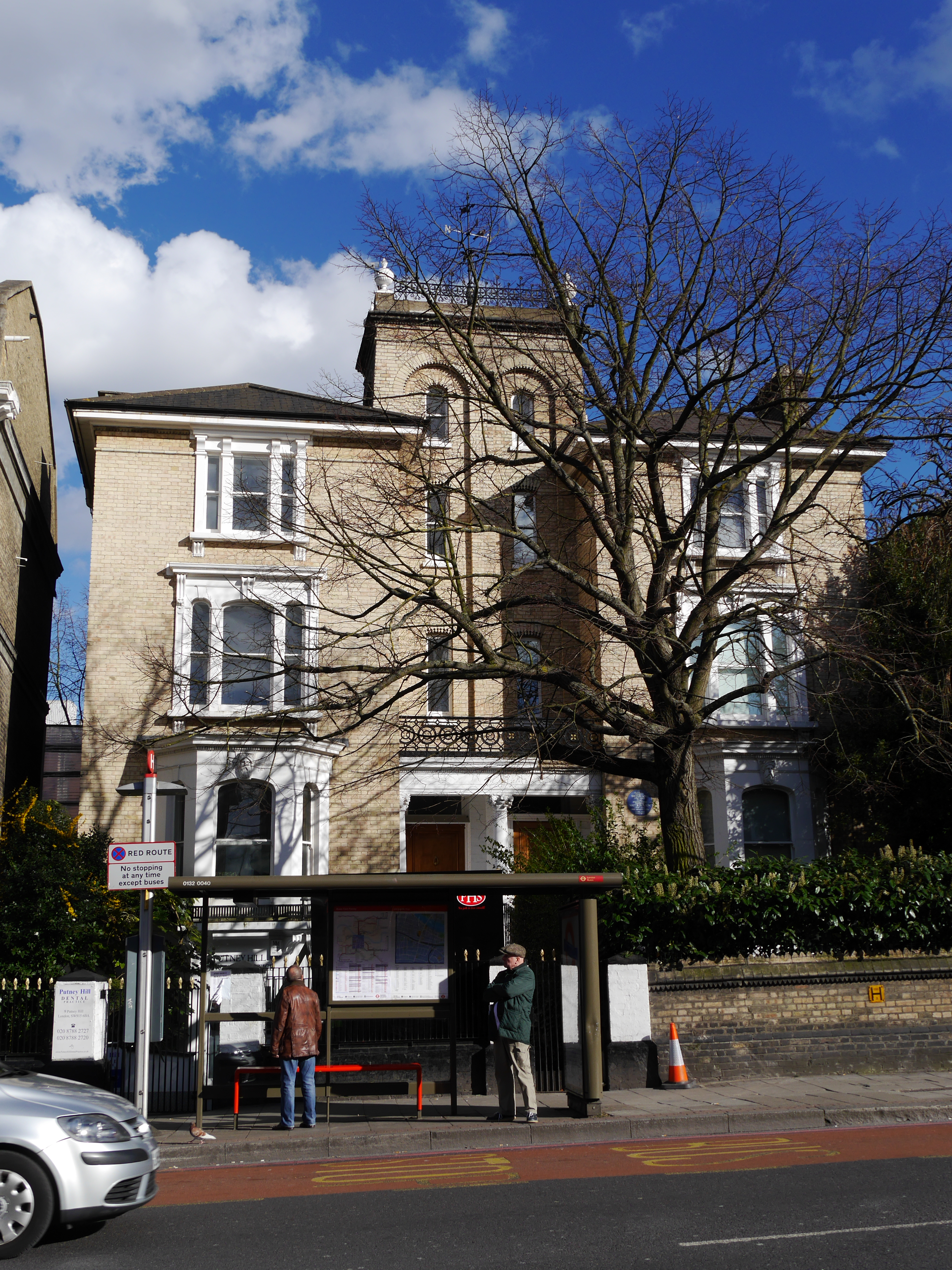
The Pines by Putney Station bus stop H

The building is at 9 - 11 Putney Hill, south of the Upper Richmond Road, Transport for London bus stop Putney Station (Stop H) is outside.

== History and residents ==
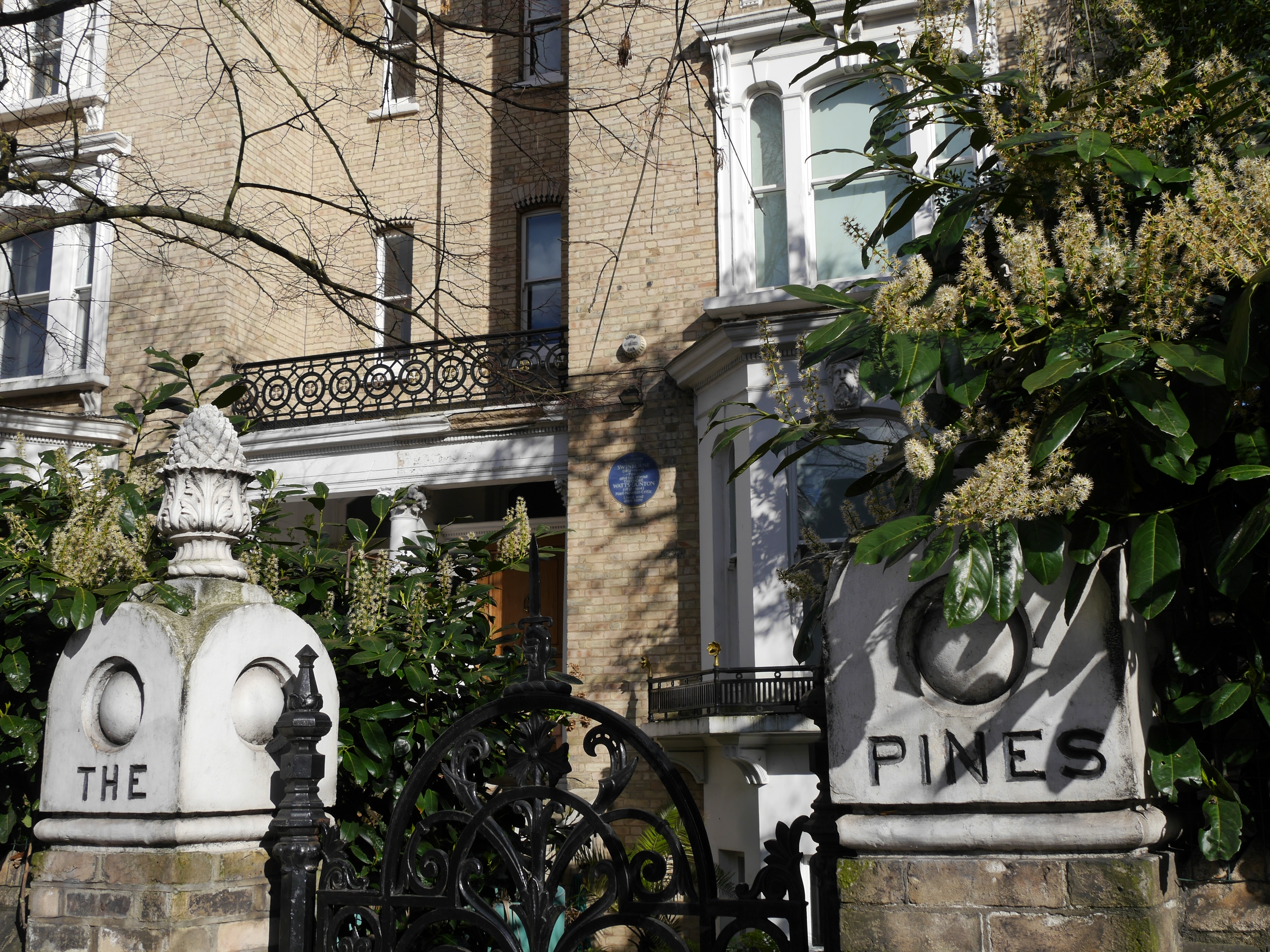
The Pines gateposts

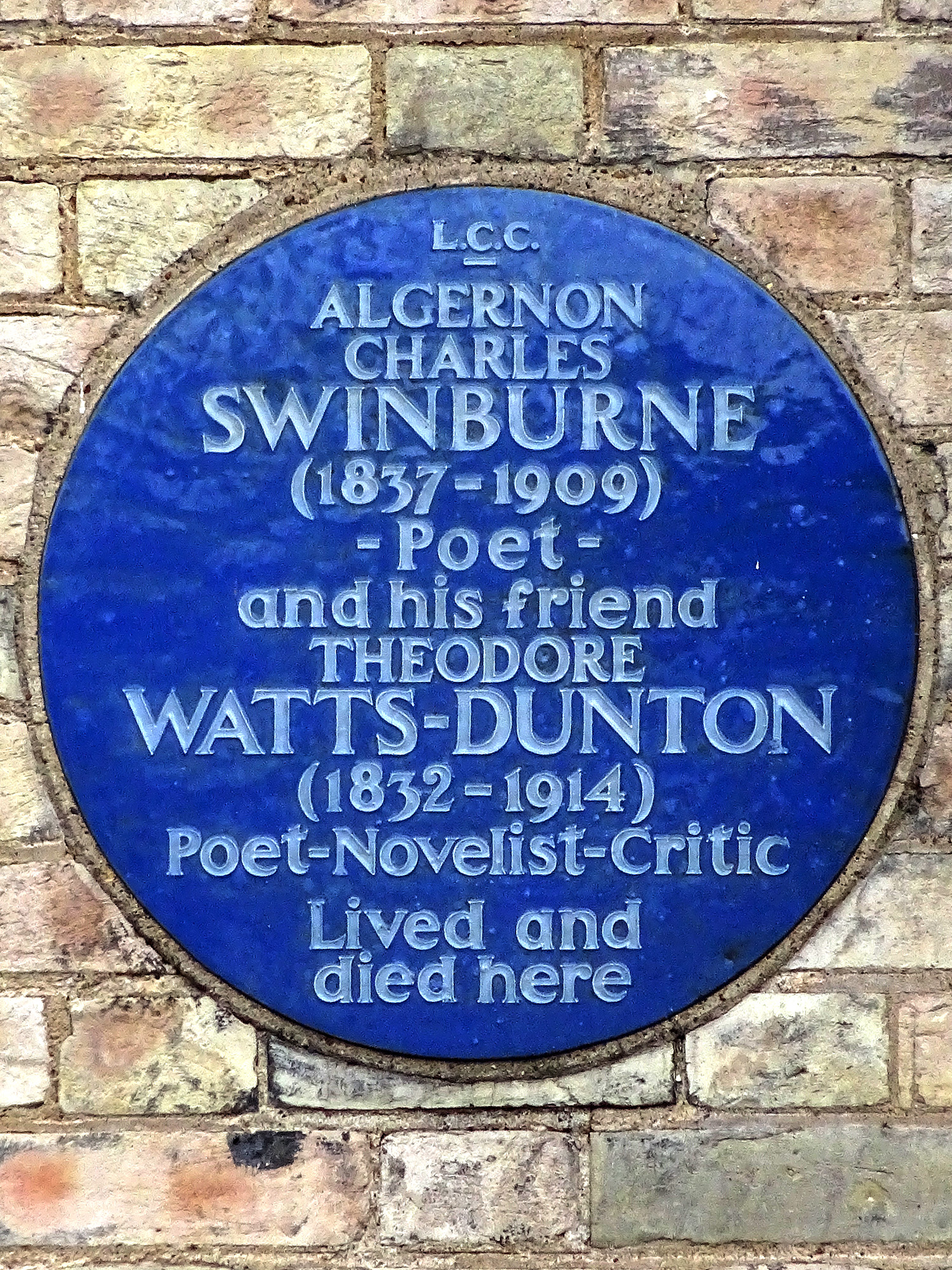
Blue plaque

The building was built circa 1870 as a pair of four-storey townhouses. Theodore Watts-Dunton moved in during 1879 with his two sisters, brother in-law, and nephew. Watts-Dunton took in Algernon Charles Swinburne until Swinburne's death in 1909. Watts-Dunton and Swinburne are seen in an image at the property in 1909 and a blue plaque erected by the London County Council on the house in 1926 reads "Algernon Charles Swinburne (1837–1909) poet, and his friend Theodore Watts-Dunton (1832–1914) poet, novelist, critic, lived and died here". Watts-Dunton lived on at The Pines for five years after his more famous companion's death in 1909 and then died there in 1914.

== Visitors ==
Essayist and cartoonist Max Beerbohm frequently visited. He described the house as being "but a few steps from the railway-station in Putney High Street" in his 1914 essay No. 2, The Pines., and illustrated a visit in a piece in 1926. Mollie Panter-Downes researched Beerbohm's visits in the book 'At the Pines' in 1971.

Watts-Dunton also took in artist Henry Treffry Dunn and provided a studio for him at The Pines until his death in 1899.
