= Wild Wales =

1862 travel book by George Borrow

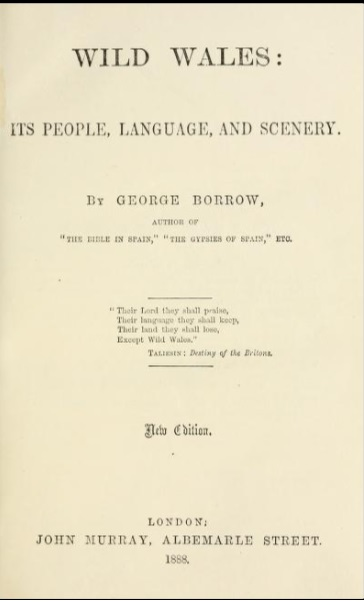
- Author: George Borrow
- Genre: Travelogue
- Publication date: 1862
- ISBN: 978-1-314-78227-1

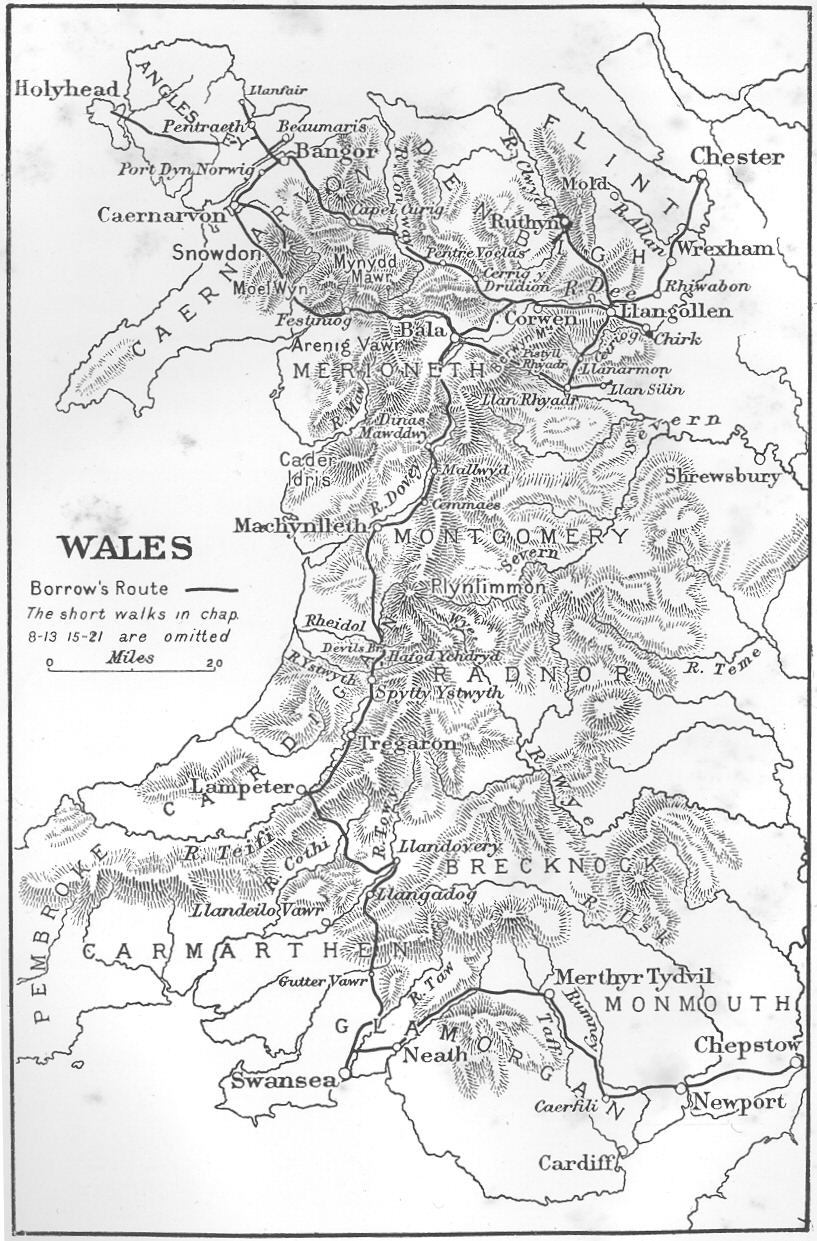
Borrow's route through Wales from the 1907 edition of the book (left), with a modern re-creation of it (right).

Wild Wales: Its People, Language and Scenery is a travel book by the English Victorian gentleman writer George Borrow (1803–1881), first published in 1862.

The book recounts Borrow's personal experiences and insights while touring Wales alone on foot after a family holiday in Llangollen in 1854, and has come to be regarded as a source of useful information about the social and geographical history of the country at that time.

It has been described as "robust, dramatic and cheerful", and the author as "an agreeably eccentric, larger-than-life, jovial man whose laughter rings all through the book".

The author makes much of his self-taught ability to speak the Welsh language and how surprised the native Welsh people he meets and talks to are by both his linguistic abilities and his travels, education and personality, and also by his idiosyncratic pronunciation of their language.

== Borrow's journey ==
Borrow gives a detailed account of his journey and starts his travels into North Wales from Chester, passing en route through Wrexham, Llangollen, Corwen and Betws-y-coed to Bangor, Anglesey, Caernarfon, Bala, Machynlleth and then south, through Mid Wales to Tregaron and Lampeter, Devil's Bridge, Cwm Ystwyth and Pont-rhyd-y-groes, eventually arriving in some of the industrial areas around the South Wales coalfields, such as Brynamman, Merthyr Tydfil and Pontardawe, before visiting Swansea and Neath and leaving the country via Caerphilly, Newport and Chepstow.

Borrow's view of Wales and the Welsh is considered to have been sympathetic by comparison with that generally prevalent in England at the time.
