= Lady Lilith =

1860–1873 oil painting by Dante Gabriel Rossetti

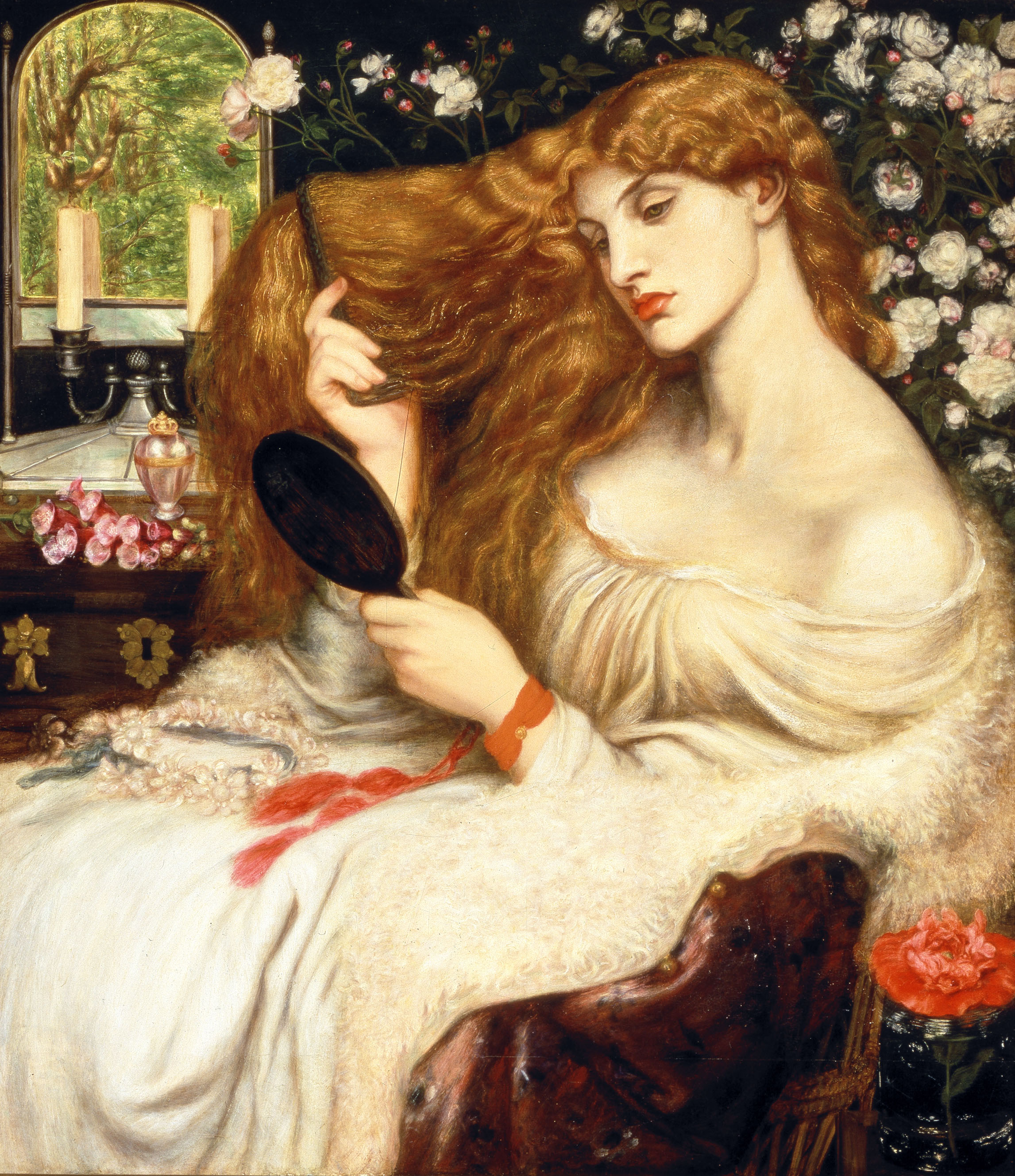
- Artist: Dante Gabriel Rossetti
- Year: 1866–1868, 1872–73
- Medium: Oil on canvas
- Dimensions: 96.5 cm × 85.1 cm (38.0 in × 33.5 in)
- Location: Delaware Art Museum, Wilmington, Delaware

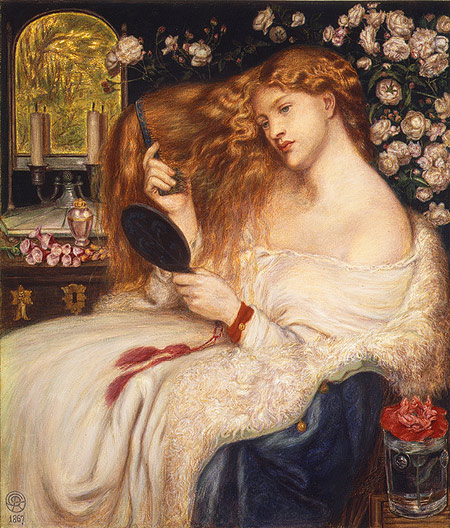
Lady Lilith, 1867, watercolour replica, showing the face of Fanny Cornforth, now in the Metropolitan Museum of Art, New York.

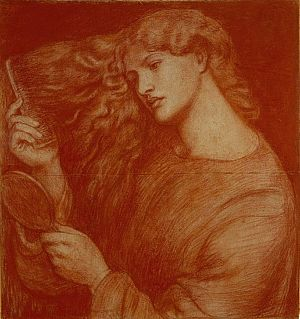
Study for Lady Lilith, 1866, in red chalk. Now in the Tel Aviv Museum of Art

Lady Lilith is an oil painting by Dante Gabriel Rossetti first painted in 1866–1868 using his mistress Fanny Cornforth as the model, then altered in 1872–73 to show the face of Alexa Wilding. The subject is Lilith, who was, according to ancient Judaic myth, "the first wife of Adam" and is associated with the seduction of men and the murder of children. She is shown as a "powerful and evil temptress" and as "an iconic, Amazon-like female with long, flowing hair."

Rossetti overpainted Cornforth's face, perhaps at the suggestion of his client, shipping magnate Frederick Richards Leyland, who displayed the painting in his drawing room with five other Rossetti "stunners." After Leyland's death, the painting was purchased by Samuel Bancroft and Bancroft's estate donated it in 1935 to the Delaware Art Museum where it is now displayed.

The painting forms a pair with Sibylla Palmifera, painted 1866–1870, also with Wilding as the model. Lady Lilith represents the body's beauty, according to Rossetti's sonnet inscribed on the frame. Sibylla Palmifera represents the soul's beauty, according to the Rossetti sonnet on its frame.

A large 1867 replica of Lady Lilith, painted by Rossetti in watercolour, which shows the face of Cornforth, is now owned by New York's Metropolitan Museum of Art. It has a verse from Goethe's Faust as translated by Shelley on a label attached by Rossetti to its frame:

"Beware of her fair hair, for she excells
All women in the magic of her locks,
And when she twines them round a young man's neck
she will not ever set him free again."

== Painting ==
On 9 April 1866 Rossetti wrote to Frederick Leyland:

As you continue to express a wish to have a good picture of mine, I write you word of another I have now begun, which will be one of my best. The picture represents a lady combing her hair. It is the same size as Palmifera – 36 x 31 inches, and will be full of material, – a landscape seen in the background. Its colour chiefly white and silver, with a great mass of golden hair.

Lady Lilith was commissioned by Leyland in early 1866 and delivered to him in early 1869 at a price of £472. 10 s. Two studies, dated to 1866, exist for the work, but two notebook sketches may be from an earlier date. The painting focuses on Lilith, but is meant to be a "Modern Lilith" rather than the mythological figure. She contemplates her own beauty in her hand-mirror. The painting is one of a series of Rossetti paintings of such "mirror pictures." Other painters soon followed with their own mirror pictures with narcissistic female figures, but Lady Lilith has been considered "the epitome" of the type.

Rossetti's assistant, Henry Treffry Dunn, states that the final part painted was the flowery background. He and G. P. Boyce gathered large baskets of white roses from John Ruskin's garden in Denmark Hill, and returned with them to Rossetti's house in Chelsea. Dunn is thought to have later recreated Rossetti's picture of Lady Lilith in coloured chalk.

Sources disagree on whether Leyland or Rossetti initiated the repainting, but the major change was the substitution of Alexa Wilding's face for Cornforth's. The painting was returned to Rossetti in February 1872, and he completed the repainting on 2 December at Kelmscott Manor before returning it to Leyland. Alexa was born Alice Wilding and was about 27 years old at the time of the repainting. Rossetti paid her a retainer of £1 per week for modelling. Wilding's face had earlier replaced the face in another painting Venus Verticordia. Despite Rossetti's record of serial liaisons with his models, there is little or no evidence of a romantic attachment between Wilding and Rossetti.

Characteristics of the painting that are commonly noted include the overt flower symbolism, and the unreal, crowded, depthless space, perhaps best shown by the bizarre mirror that reflects both the candles in the "room" and an exterior garden scene.

The white roses may indicate cold, sensuous love and reflect the tradition that roses first "blushed" or turned red upon meeting Eve. The poppy in the lower right hand corner may indicate sleep and forgetfulness and reflect the languid nature of Lilith. Foxgloves, near the mirror, may indicate insincerity.

One of Rossetti's assistants, Charles Fairfax Murray, who had created copies of his master's work claimed that some paintings later attributed to Rossetti were actually painted by his assistants. Murray claimed that the Lady Lilith in the Metropolitan Museum of Art was painted by Henry Treffry Dunn and was just "touched up" by Rossetti.

== Body's Beauty and Soul's Beauty ==
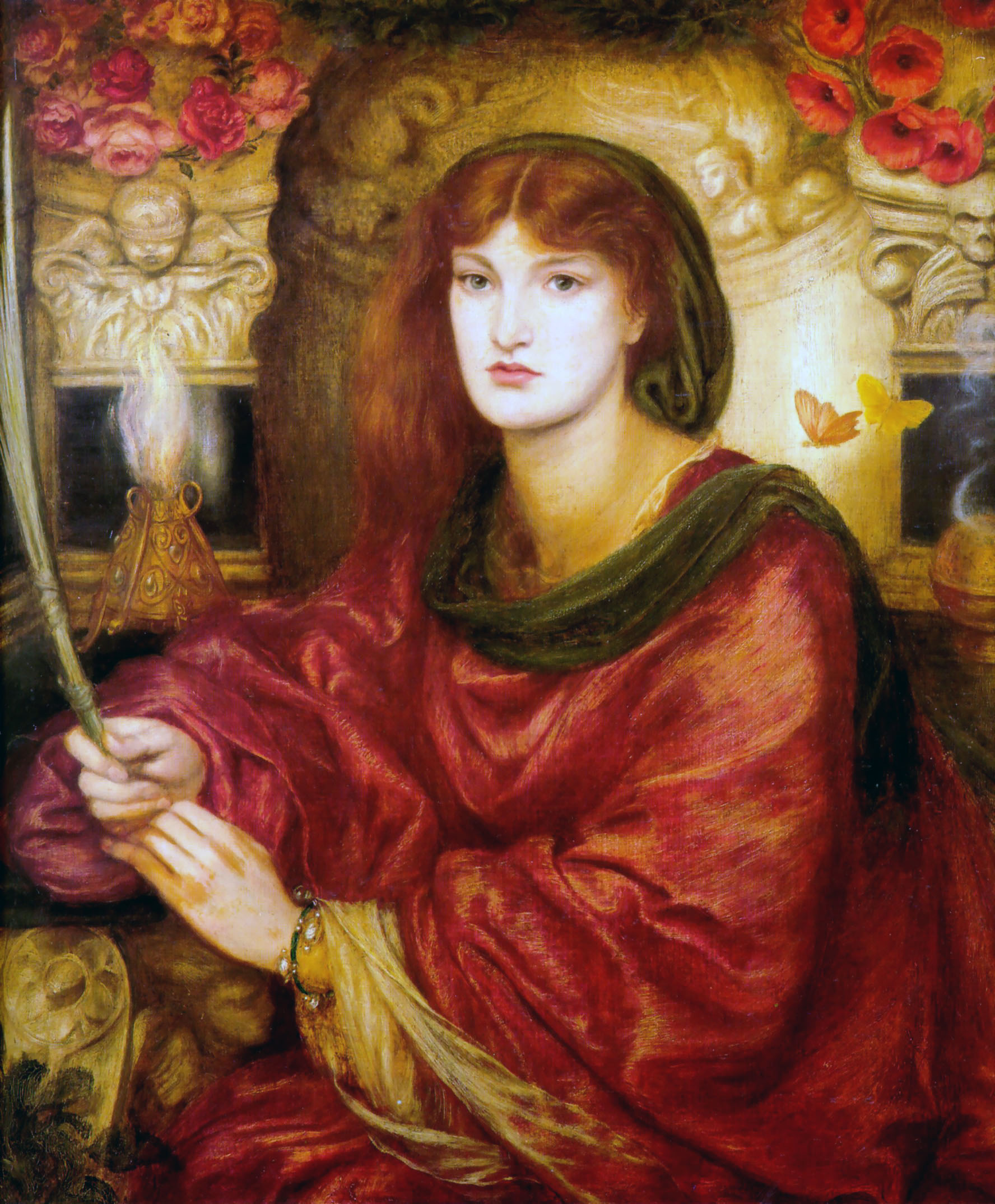
Sibylla Palmifera, 1866–1870, also features Alexa Wilding as the model. It forms a pair with Lady Lilith with Rossetti poems inscribed on each frame. Now in the Lady Lever Art Gallery.

Rossetti began painting Sibylla Palmifera before persuading George Rae to commission it in late 1865. The final price was 400 guineas. He worked sporadically on the painting and only completed it in December 1870. In June 1869 he received £200 from Leyland for a copy that was never completed.

The name Palmifera means "palm-bearer," and the model holds a palm in her hands. The palm, together with the inclusion of butterflies, may indicate the spiritual nature of the painting. This painting also has flower symbolism – using red roses and poppies in this case – and an unrealistic background space.

Rossetti wrote the sonnet "Soul's Beauty" to accompany the painting Sibylla Palmifera, just as he wrote the sonnet "Lilith" to accompany the painting Lady Lilith. Both pairs of poems and pictures were first published, side by side, in Algernon Charles Swinburne's Notes on the Royal Academy Exhibition in 1868. In 1870 the poems were published again in Rossetti's Sonnets for Pictures.

It was not until 1881 however that the sonnets became a true pair. At that time Rossetti decided to directly contrast the two poems, renamed "Lilith" to "Body's Beauty" and published them on consecutive pages of his book The House of Life as sonnets LXXVII and LXXVIII.

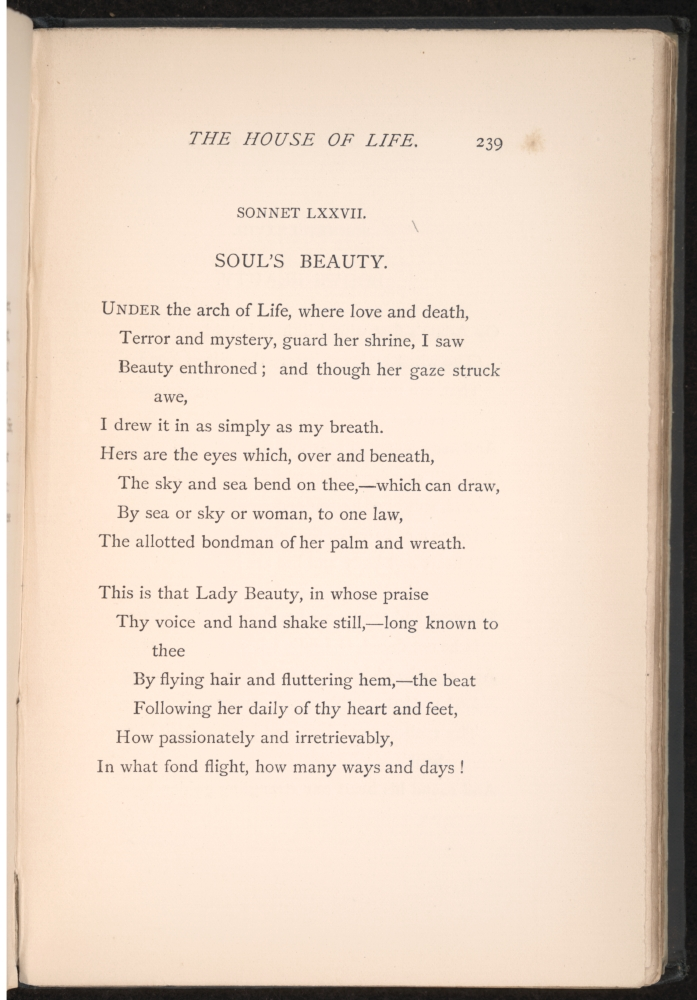
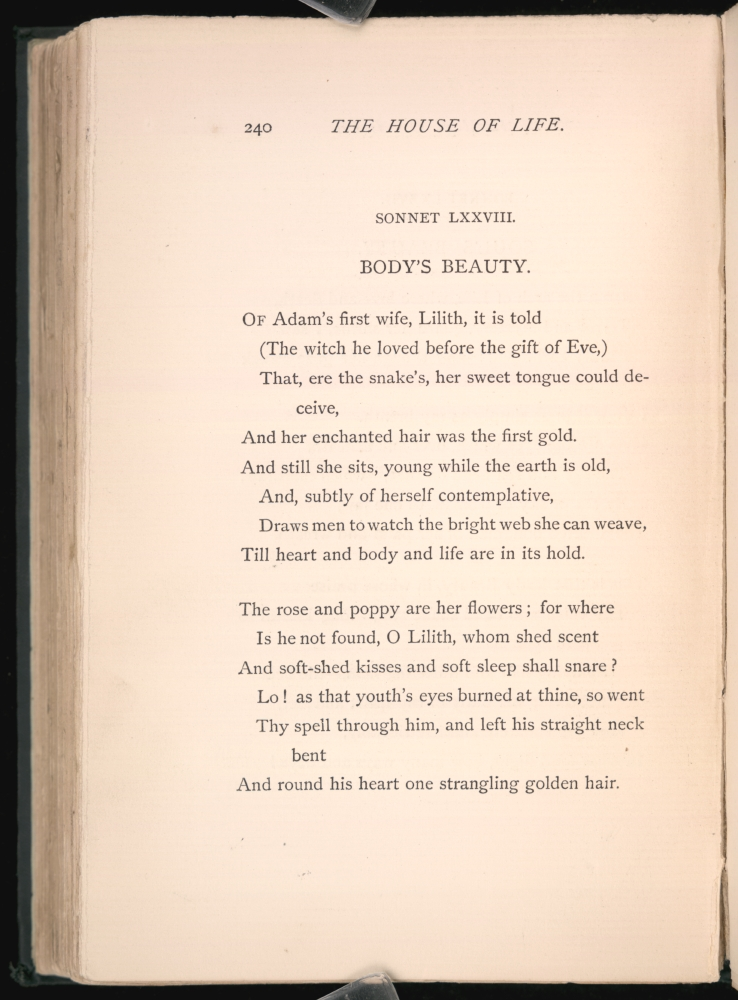

== Feminist perspective ==
In myth, Lilith is a powerful, threatening, sexual woman who resists domination by men. Thus she has been considered a symbol of the feminist movement. In the painting she concentrates on her own beauty, luxuriates in her free, sensual hair, lacks the usual Victorian corset, and wears "clothes that look as if they are soon to be removed."

In The Power of Women's Hair in the Victorian Imagination, Elizabeth G. Gitter writes:

The more abundant the hair, the more potent the sexual invitation implied in its display. For folk, literary and psychoanalytic traditions agree that the luxuriance of the hair is an index of vigorous sexuality, even of wantonness.

== Display and exhibitions ==
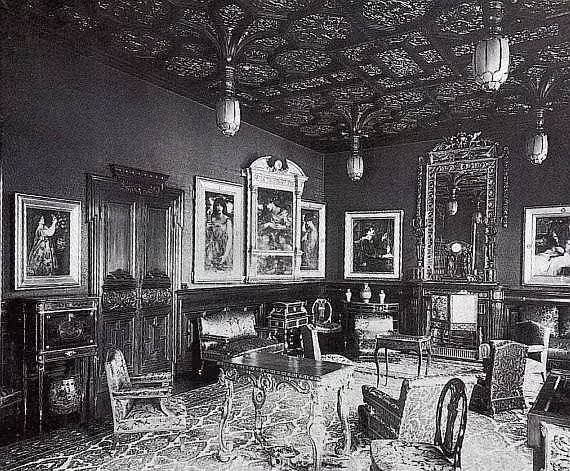
Six Rossetti paintings as hung in Leyland's drawing room, 1892. Lady Lilith hangs at the far right. (Click on any painting for its article.)

The painting hung in Leyland's drawing room with five other Rossetti paintings that Leyland called "stunners."

Samuel Bancroft, a textile mill owner from Wilmington, Delaware, bought the painting at Leyland's estate sale, held at Christie's on 28 May 1892, for £525. He bought at least four other Rossetti paintings at the same time and later accumulated one of the largest collections of Pre-Raphaelite art outside the United Kingdom. The Bancroft estate donated Bancroft's extensive collection of paintings in 1935 to the Delaware Art Museum.

The painting was exhibited in London in 1883, and Philadelphia in 1892 while Bancroft's house was being expanded to hold his new paintings. It has also been exhibited in Richmond, Virginia (1982), Tokyo (1990), Birmingham and Williamstown (2000), and in London, Liverpool and Amsterdam (2003). In 2012 it was exhibited at the Tate Gallery in London, and from 17 February to 19 May 2013 it was on exhibit at the National Gallery of Art in Washington, D.C.

== See also ==
- List of paintings by Dante Gabriel Rossetti

== Sources ==
- Wildman, Stephen; Laurel Bradley; Deborah Cherry; John Christian; David B. Elliott; Betty Elzea; Margaretta Fredrick; Caroline Hannah; Jan Marsh; Gayle Seymour (2004). Waking Dreams, the Art of the Pre-Raphaelites from the Delaware Art Museum. Art Services International. p. 395.
