= Bible translations into Manchu =

Putting the Christian scriptures into the Asian language

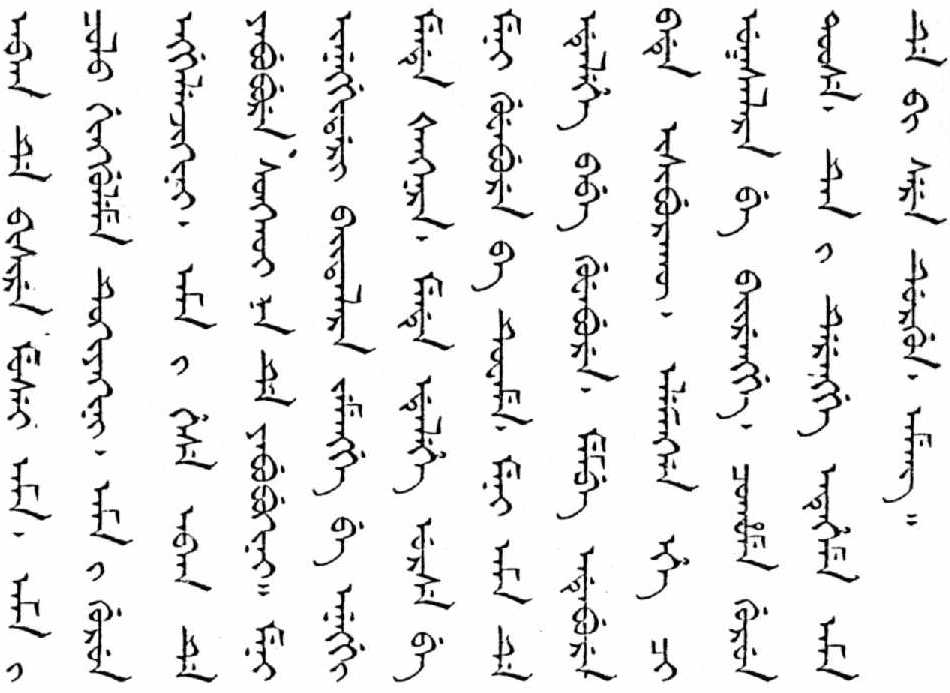
Manchu translation of the Lord's Prayer by S. V. Lipovtsov

The translation of the Bible into the Manchu language was started in the 18th century, but only the translation of the New Testament has been published.

== de Poirot translation ==
The Jesuit scholar and painter at the court of the Qianlong Emperor, Louis Antoine de Poirot (1735–1813), made a translation of the Old Testament into Manchu some time before 1790, but this translation was never published. A copy of the translation is preserved in the library of the British and Foreign Bible Society in London.

== Lipovtsov-Borrow translation ==
The first published translation of the Bible into Manchu was made by Stepan Vaciliyevich Lipovtsov [Степан Васильевич Липовцов] (1770–1841). Lipovtsov had been a member of the eighth Russian Ecclesiastical Mission in Beijing from 1794 to 1807, where he had learned Manchu, and was later a member of the Russian Foreign Office. In 1821, the British and Foreign Bible Society commissioned Lipovtsov to translate the New Testament into Manchu. In 1822, 550 copies of the translated Gospel of Matthew were printed in Saint Petersburg; however, most of these were destroyed in a flood.

In 1833 the British and Foreign Bible Society sent George Borrow (1803–1881) to Russia to supervise the completion of the translation of the New Testament into Manchu. Borrow learned Manchu in six months using Lipovtsov's translation and a Manchu-French dictionary. Within two years Lipovtsov and Borrow had completed the translation of the New Testament, and in 1835, 1,000 copies were printed in Saint Petersburg. Borrow wanted to go to China to distribute the translation, but the Russian authorities refused to let him take the Bible with him in case it damaged diplomatic relations between Russia and China. It was not until ten years later that the translation made its way to China. In 1859, parallel Chinese and Manchu translations of the Gospels of Matthew and Mark were printed in China, but by then Manchu was no longer a widely spoken language. A reprint of the Manchu translation of the New Testament was made in Shanghai in 1929.

ᠮᡠᠰᡝᡳ
ᡝᠵᡝᠨ
ᡳᠰᡠᠰ
ᡥᡝᡵᡳᠰᡨᠣᠰ
ᡳ
ᡨᡠᡨᠠᠪᡠᡥᠠ
ᡳᠴᡝ
ᡥᡝᠰᡝ Wylie: Mousei echen Isus Gheristos i tutapuha itche ghese, Möllendorff: Musei ejen Isus Heristos i tutabuha ice hese, the New Testament, published under the British and Foreign Bible Society.

== Sample ==
The following is a sample showing the Manchu translation of the Lord's Prayer from Gospel of Matthew chapter 6 verses 9–13, together with the corresponding English translation from the Authorized King James Version of 1611.

Translation	Mathew 6:9–13	Transliteration
Authorized Version, 1611	Our Father which art in heaven, Hallowed be thy name. ¹⁰Thy kingdom come, Thy will be done in earth, as it is in heaven. ¹¹Give us this day our daily bread. ¹²And forgive us our debts, as we forgive our debtors. ¹³And lead us not into temptation, but deliver us from evil: For thine is the kingdom, and the power, and the glory, for ever. Amen.	
S. V. Lipovtsov, 1822	ᠠᠪᡴᠠ ᡩᡝ ᠪᡳᠰᡳᡵᡝ ᠮᡠᠰᡝᡳ ᠠᠮᠠ᠈ ᠠᠮᠠ ᡳ ᠴᠣᠯᠣ ᡤᡳᠩᡤᡠᠯᡝᠮᡝ ᡨᡠᡴᡳᠶᠠᡴᡳᠨᡳ᠈ ᠠᠮᠠ ᡳ ᡤᡠᡵᡠᠨ ᡝᠩᡤᡝᠯᡝᠨᠵᡳᡴᡳᠨᡳ᠈ ᠠᠮᠠ ᡳ ᡥᡝᠰᡝ ᠠᠪᡴᠠ ᡩᡝ ᠶᠠᠪᡠᠪᡠᡵᡝ ᠰᠣᠩᡴᠣᡳ ᠨᠠ ᡩᡝ ᠶᠠᠪᡠᠪᡠᡴᡳᠨᡳ᠉ ᠮᡝᠨᡳ ᡳᠨᡝᠩᡤᡳᡩᠠᡵᡳ ᠪᠠᡳᡨᠠᠯᠠᡵᠠ ᠵᡝᠮᡝᠩᡤᡝ ᠪᡝ ᡝᠨᡝᠩᡤᡳ ᠮᡝᠨᡩᡝ ᡧᠠᠩᠨᠠᡵᠠ᠈ ᠮᡝᠨᡩᡝ ᡝᡩᡝᠯᡝᡥᡝ ᡠᡵᠰᡝ ᠪᡝ ᠮᡝᠨᡳ ᡤᡠᠸᡝᠪᡠᡵᡝ ᠪᠠ ᡨᡠᠸᠠᠮᡝ᠈ ᠮᡝᠨᡳ ᠠᠮᠠ ᡩᡝ ᡝᡩᡝᠯᡝᡥᡝ ᠪᠠᠪᡝᠪ ᡤᡠᠸᡝᠪᡠᡵᡝ᠈ ᠮᡝᠮᠪᡝ ᡝᠨᡩᡝᠪᡠᡵᡝ ᠪᠠᡩᡝ ᡳᠰᡳᠪᡠᡵᠠᡴᡡ᠈ ᡝᠯᡝᠮᠠᠩᡤᠠ ᡝᡥᡝ ᠴᡳ ᡠᡴᠰᠠᠯᠠᡵᠠ ᠪᡝ ᠪᠠᡳᡵᡝᠩᡤᡝ᠈ ᠴᠣᡥᠣᠮᡝ ᡤᡠᡵᡠᠨ ᡨᠣᠣᠰᡝ᠈ ᡨᡝᠨ ᡳ ᡩᡝᡵᡝᠩᡤᡝ ᡝᠨᡨᡝᡥᡝᠮᡝ ᠠᠮᠠ ᡩᡝ ᠪᡳ ᠰᡝᡵᡝ ᡩᡠᡵᡤᡠᠨ᠈ ᠠᠮᡝᠩ᠉	Abka de bisire musei ama, ama i colo gingguleme tukiyakini, ama i gurun enggelenjikini, ama i hese abka de yabubure songkoi na de yabubukini. Meni inenggidari baitalara jemengge be enenggi mende xangnara, mende edelehe urse be meni guwebure ba tuwame, meni ama de edelehe babe guwebure, membe endebure bade isiburakv, elemangga ehe ci uksalara be bairengge, cohome gurun toose, ten i derengge enteheme ama de bi sere durgun, ameng.
