= The Romany Rye =

1857 novel by George Borrow

The Romany Rye is a novel by George Borrow, written in 1857 as a sequel to Lavengro (1851).

== The novel ==
Largely thought to be at least partly autobiographical, The Romany Rye follows from Lavengro (1851). The title can be translated from Romany as "Gypsy Gentleman". Mrs George Borrow wrote on 18 October 1853 to John Murray, his publisher, saying her husband had completed his work – "which he proposes to call The Romany Rye – A Sequel to Lavengro."

The story itself follows the journey of a learned young man living with Romanies. It is a philosophical adventure story of sorts. The book involves meetings with a number of eccentric characters. It also contains what could be called ethnographic material on the customs and views of the Romani women. The author obtains a valuable horse from his Romani friend Jasper Petulengro and eventually sells it to a Hungarian at the Horncastle horse fair. As with Lavengro, the story ends rather abruptly with the author's realisation that the Romani language has close links to the Northern Indian languages: he resolves to travel to India but Borrow himself did not do so.

== In popular culture ==
It was adapted to film.

A pub located in Colman Road, Norwich, was named The Romany Rye, and later The Romany Beer House before it ceased trading in November 2008. The Wetherspoons public house chain used the name Romany Rye for their pub, opened in Dereham, Norfolk, in 2011. Borrow was born in the town.
