= Henry Treffry Dunn =

English painter

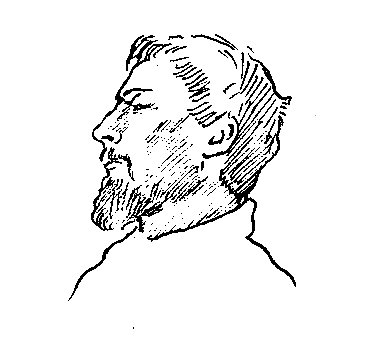
- Detail from a pair of sketches by Rossetti
- Born: 1838; Truro, Cornwall, England
- Died: 1899 (aged 60–61)
- Known for: assistant to Rossetti

Henry Treffry Dunn (1838–1899) was Dante Gabriel Rossetti's assistant and a painter in his own right. Dunn's memoirs are a valuable source for the lives of the Pre-Raphaelites. He was paid to be Rossetti's factotum and to create copies of Rossetti's paintings. It has been said that the painting Lady Lilith in the Metropolitan Museum of Art was actually painted by Dunn and only "touched up" by Rossetti.

Dunn left Rossetti's house because he was owed his salary. After Rossetti died, Dunn received the money that was owing to him. He died while living with the poets Algernon Charles Swinburne and Theodore Watts-Dunton.

== Life and career ==
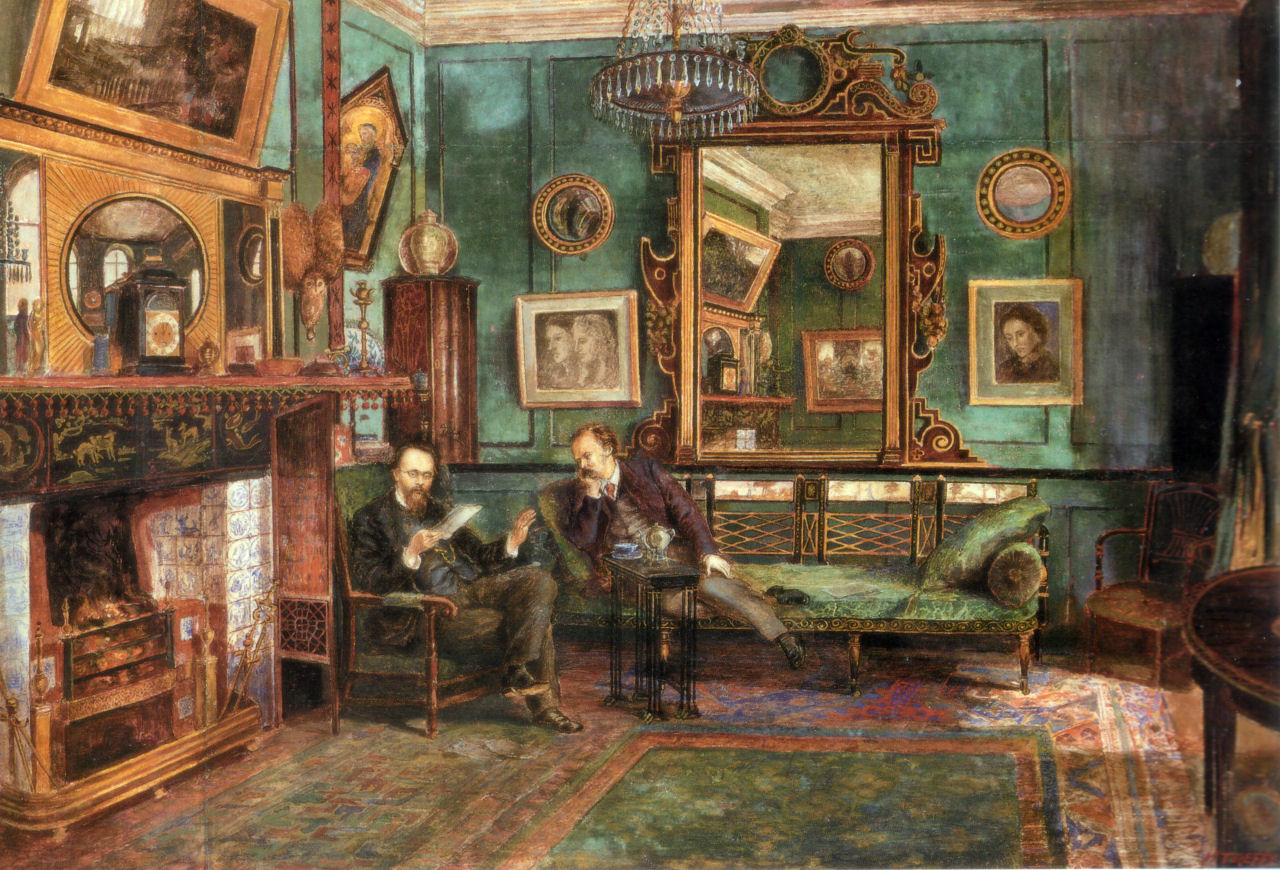
Rossetti and Theodore Watts-Dunton at 16 Cheyne Walk by Henry Treffry Dunn

Dunn was the son of a tea merchant. He was born in 1838 in Truro and trained at Heatherleys School of Fine Art in Chelsea. His sister Edith (born 1843) exhibited paintings, and another of his sisters was a professor of music. He took up the position of assistant to Rossetti at Cheyne Walk in 1867 when Rossetti's assistant, Walter Knewstubb, left to launch his own career. Dunn had been recommended for the position by the artist Walter Deverell. The painter's brother William Rossetti described Dunn as having bright dark eyes and being prematurely grey.

Dunn's paintings are influenced by Rossetti and in some cases he would make preliminary studies and copies for Rossetti. His painting style was described as "more solid than graceful". Dunn recounted that he was given the position after successfully creating a copy of Rossetti's work. Rossetti used his assistant frequently to create copies which he would complete and at one stage Dunn complains at having to create a third copy of the same painting. Some have said that some of Rossetti's paintings were in fact almost entirely created by Dunn. Charles Fairfax Murray, who was later another of Rossetti's assistants, claimed that the Lady Lilith in the Metropolitan Museum of Art was painted by Dunn and then "touched up" by Rossetti.

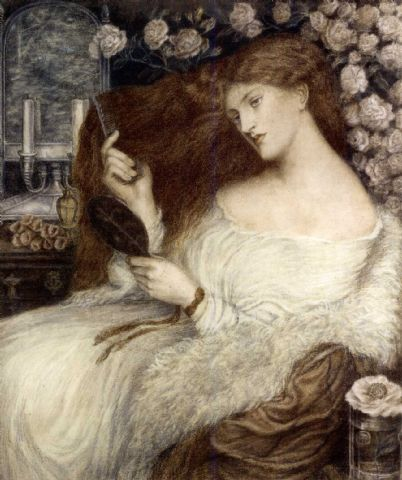
A version of Lady Lilith which is attributed to Dunn.

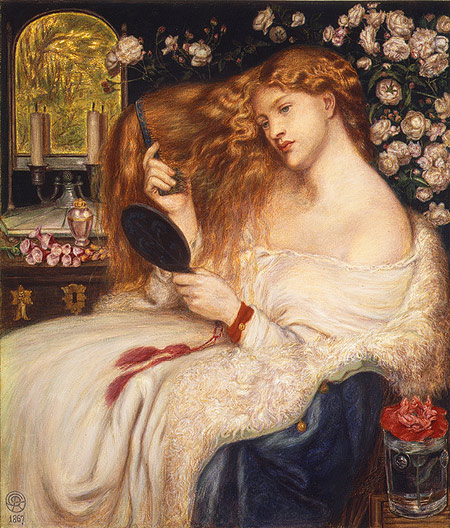
The version of Lady Lilith in the Metropolitan Museum "said to be" by Dunn

Dunn's paintings include a version of Lady Lilith which is attributed to him. Dunn is thought to have later recreated this picture in coloured chalk based on Rossetti's version. Alexa or Alice Wilding was admired by Dunn although it not known if his feelings were returned. Dunn is reported to have only had a few women in his life and no long term attachments.

Dunn was not only an artist's assistant, but also a secretary and friend. It was Dunn who first arranged for Rossetti to get a bank account, as Rossetti would keep his money in a drawer where he, and others, could freely help themselves.

Dunn worked as Rossetti's assistant for many years, but they quarrelled and Rossetti refused to pay him. The quarrel continued until Dunn returned to his native Cornwall in 1880, leaving Rossetti's household in chaos. Rossetti then replaced Dunn with another companion; the author Hall Caine. The lost salary remained in dispute until after Rossetti's death. When Rossetti died Dunn was very helpful to William Rossetti in his role as executor, though he considered Dunn to be an alcoholic. Dunn eventually obtained the considerable sum of money that was owed to him from Rossetti's estate.

At the end of his life he was taken in by the critic and poet Theodore Watts-Dunton who had earlier saved Swinburne from alcoholism. The three of them lived together at Watts-Dunton's house until Dunn died in 1899.

Dunn's recollections of Rossetti and his friends were later published.

== Legacy ==
Dunn's watercolours and his other paintings are in collections in Cornwall and other British galleries.

== Gallery ==
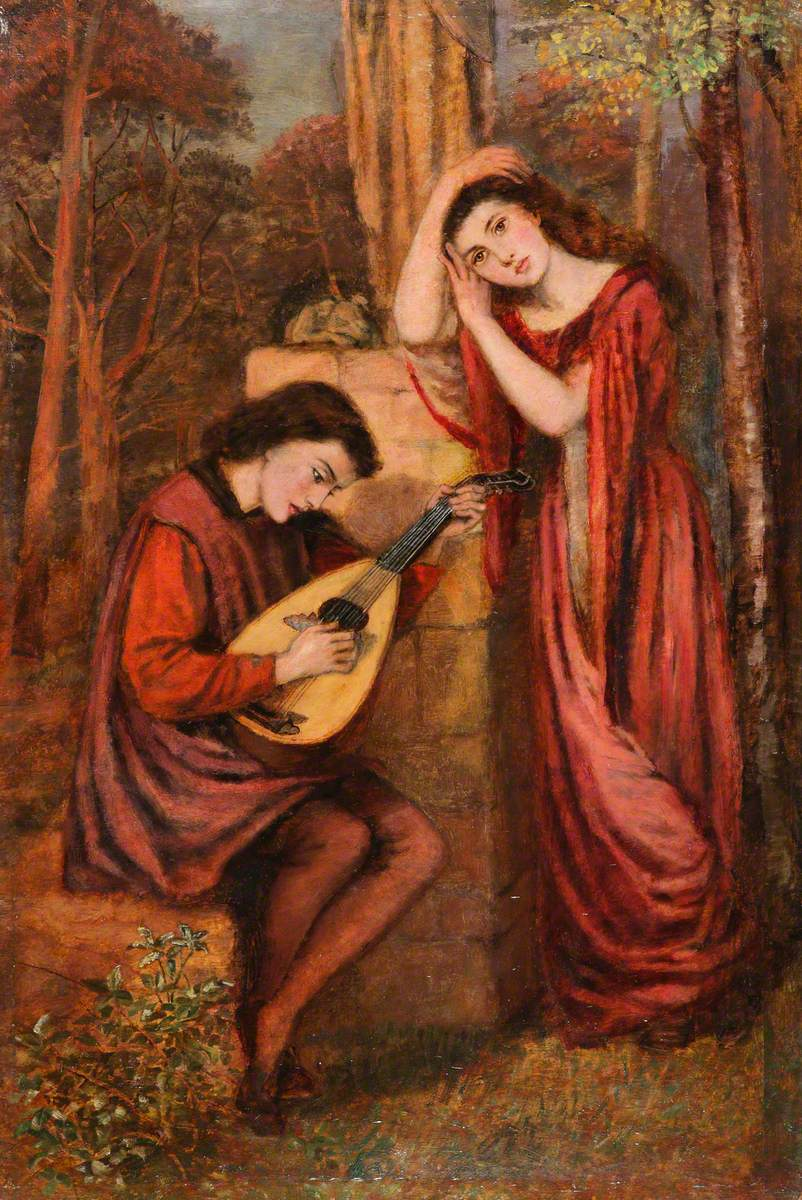
Genevieve

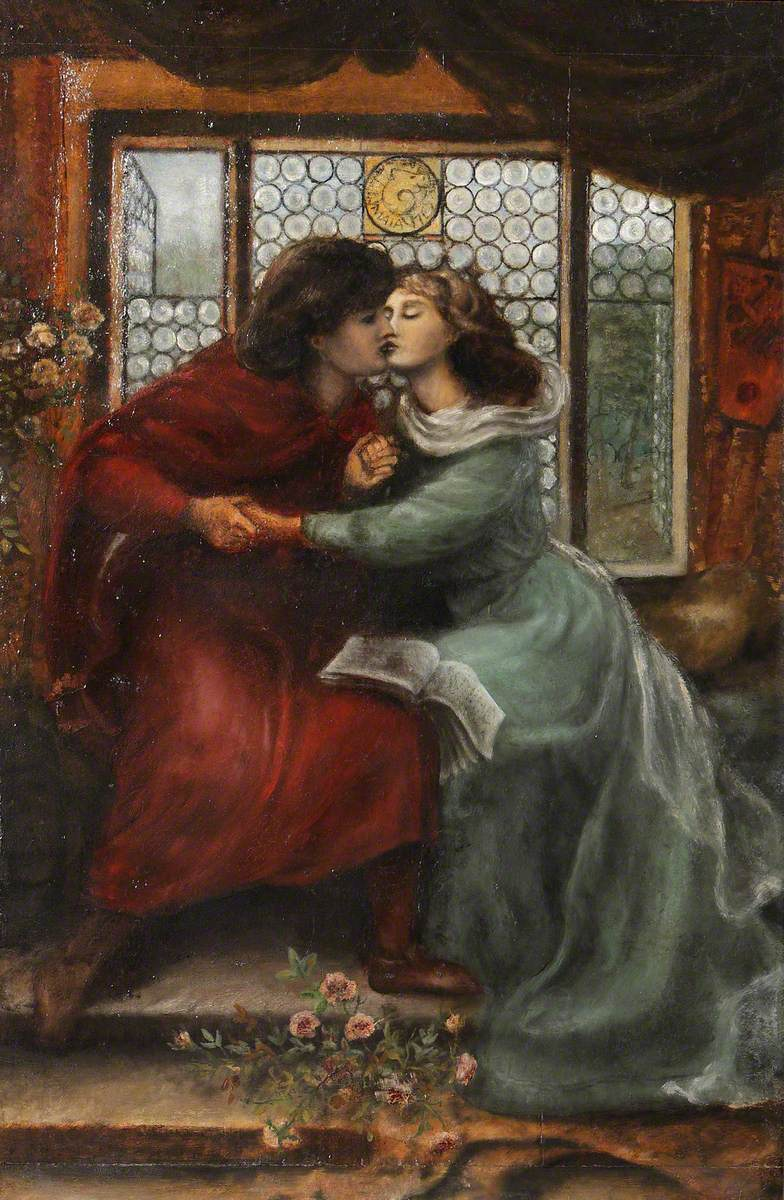
Paolo and Francesca da Rimini

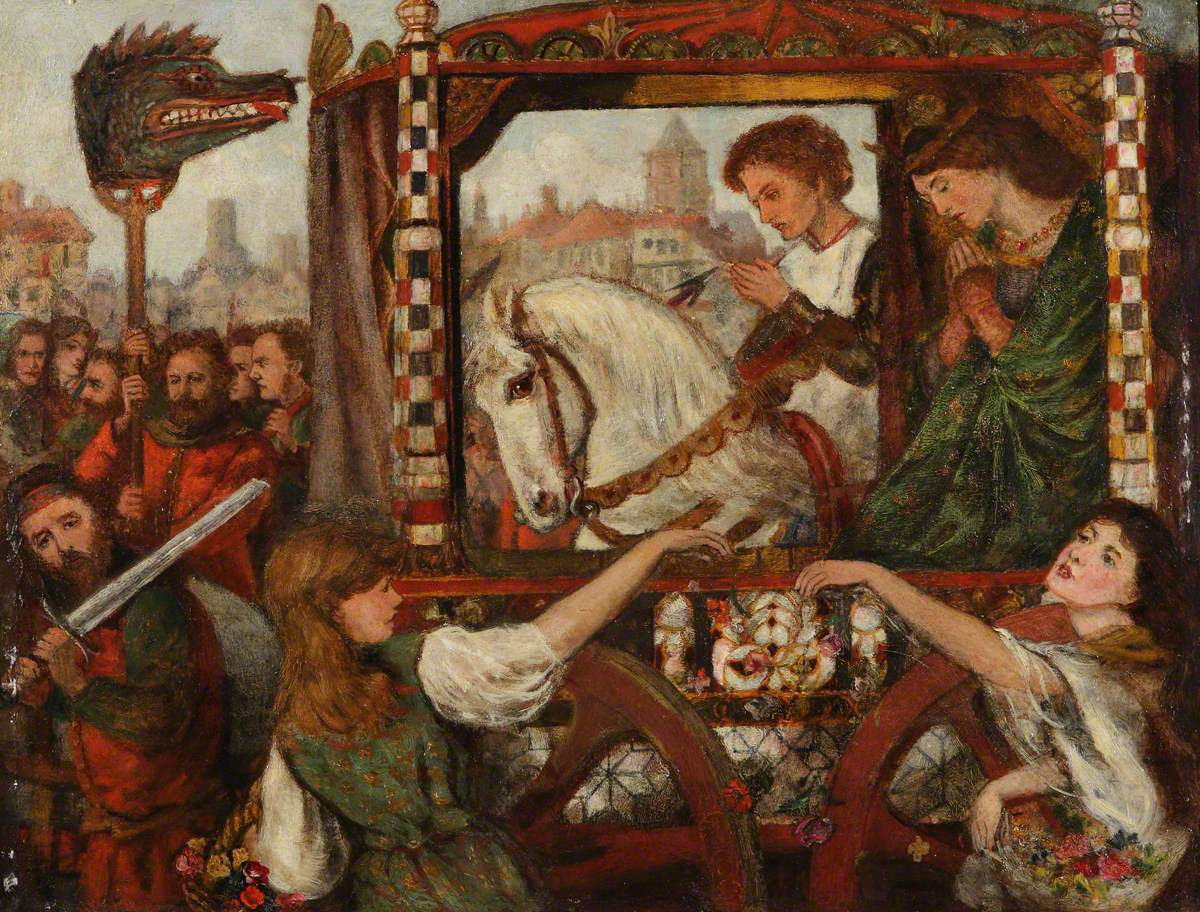
The Return of the Princess

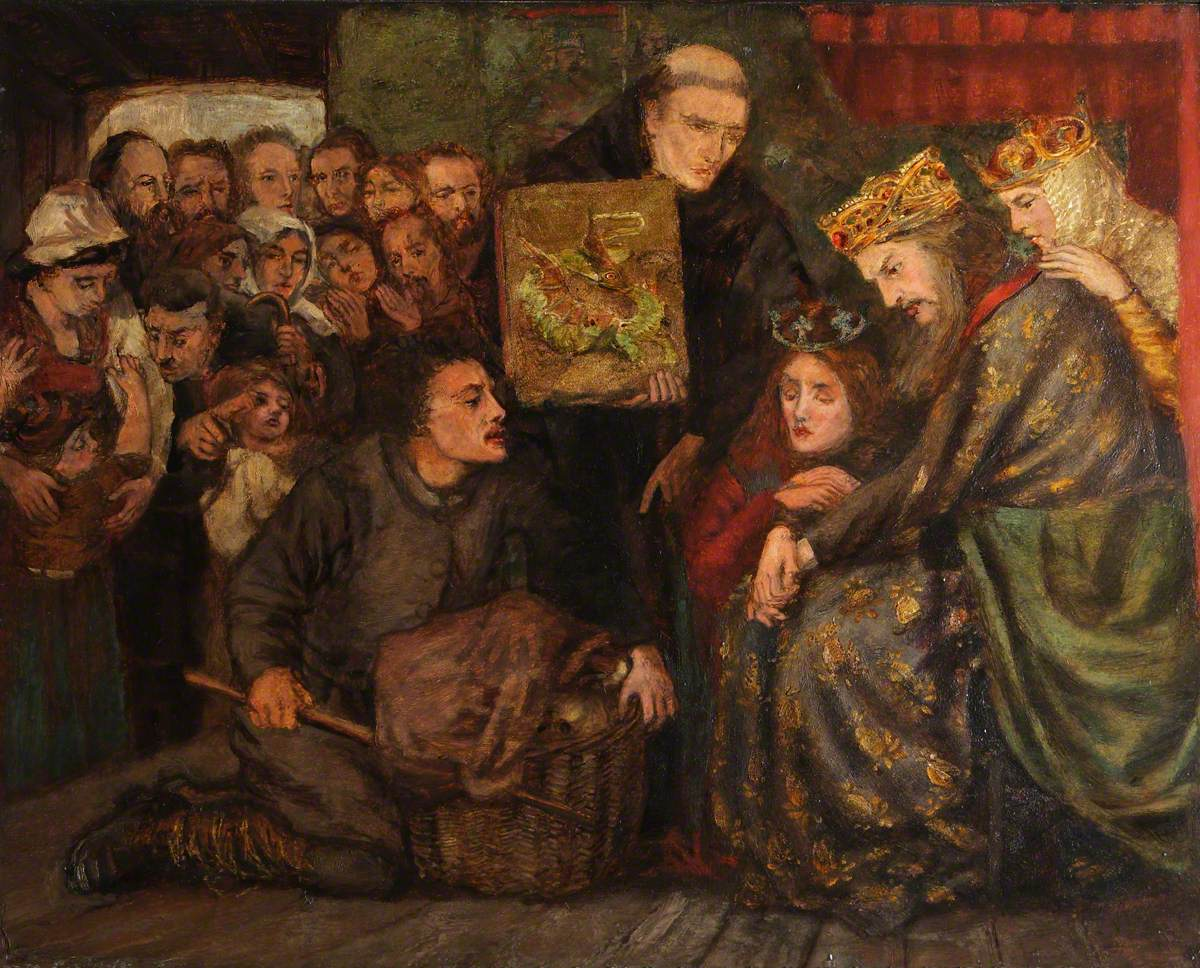
The Skulls Brought to the King

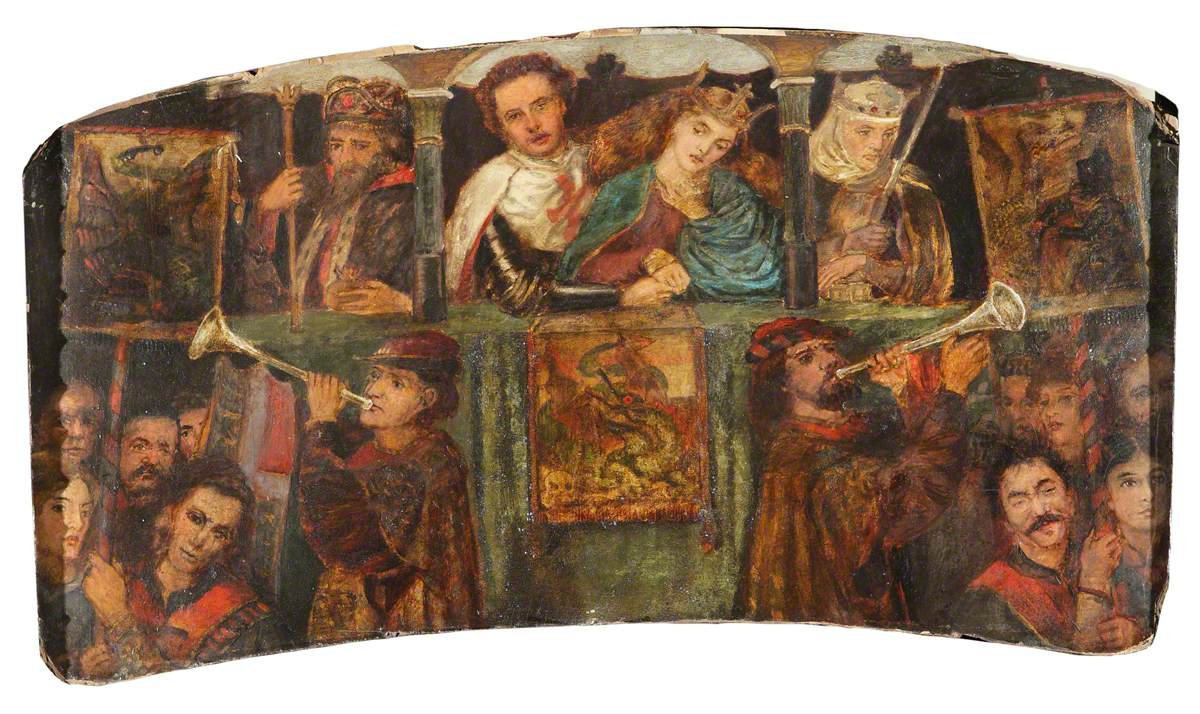
The Wedding of Saint George

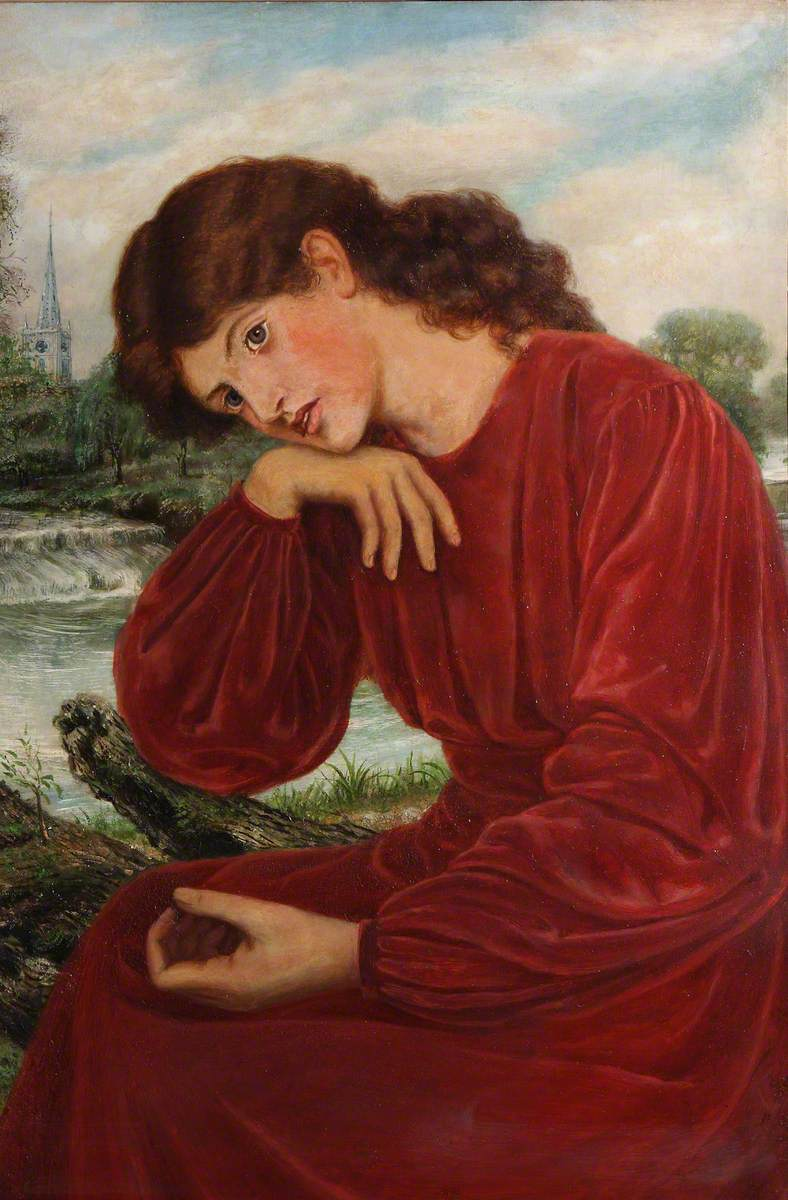
Jane Morris

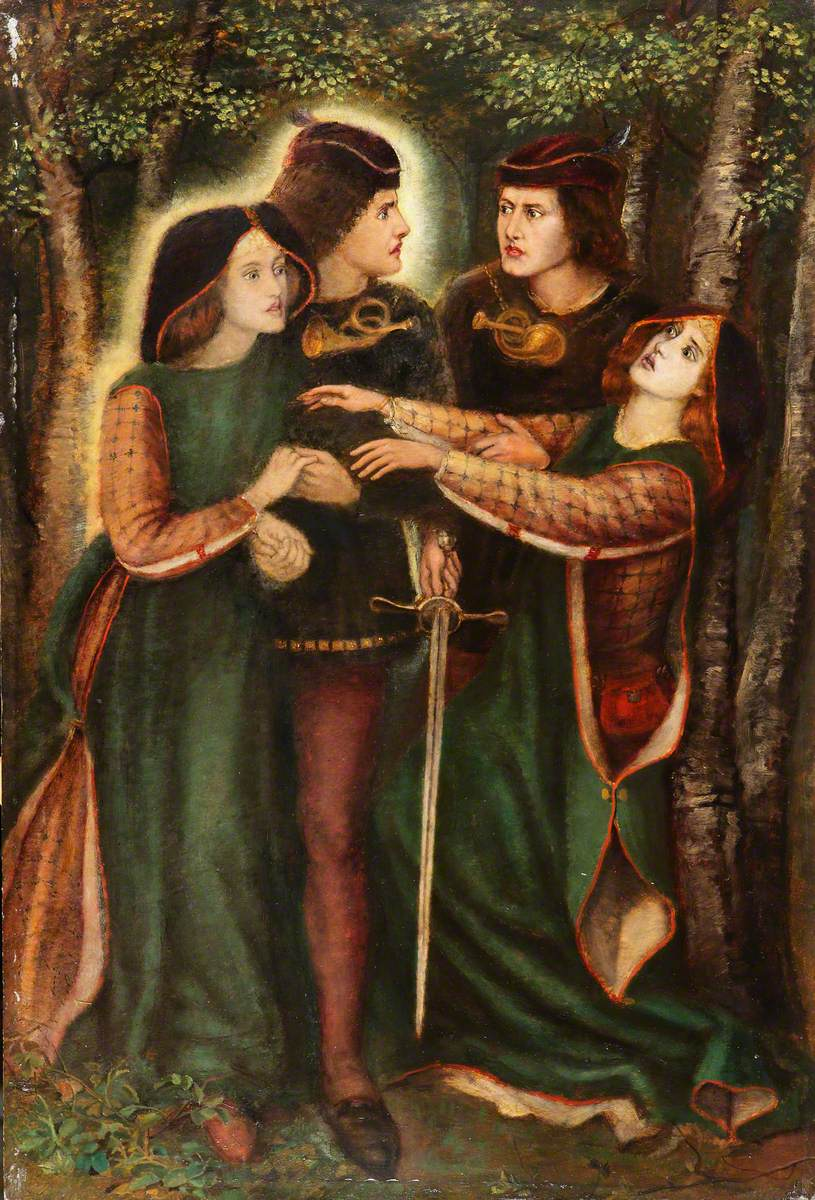
How They Met Themselves

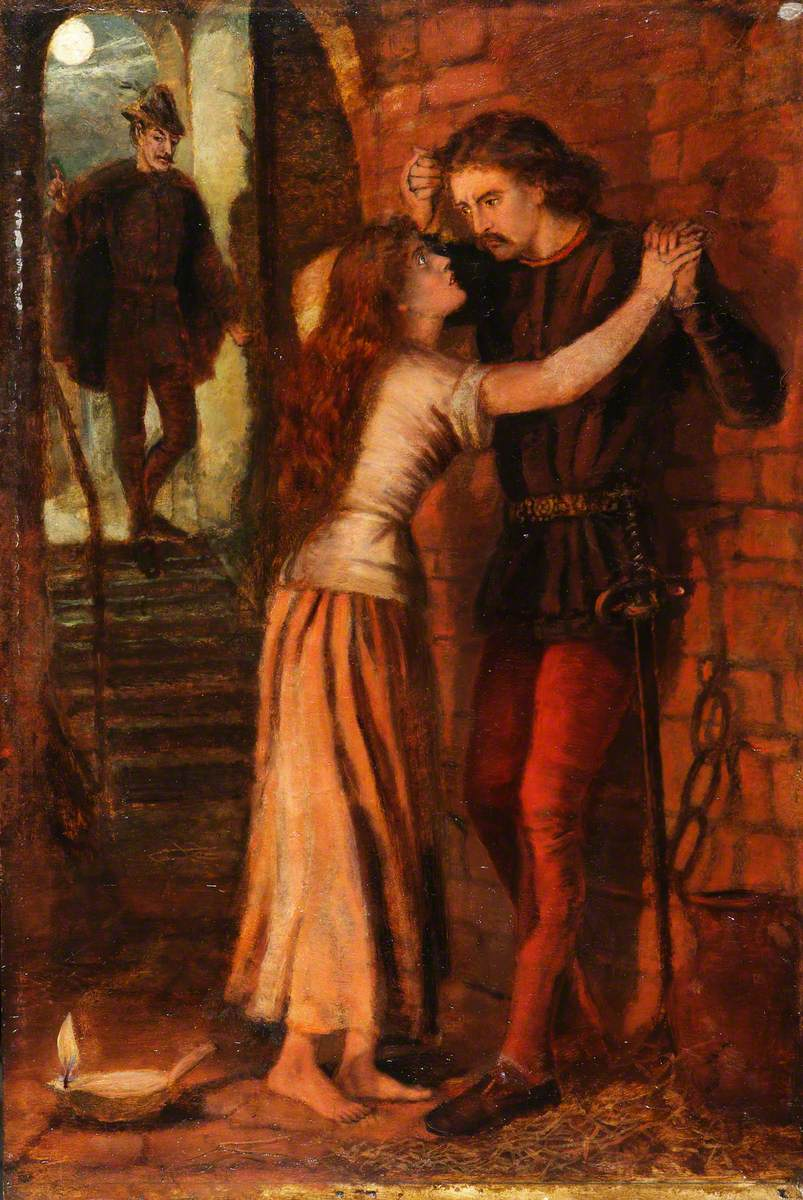
Faust and Margaret in Prison
