= George Borrow =

English writer of fiction and travel (1803–1881)

George Henry Borrow
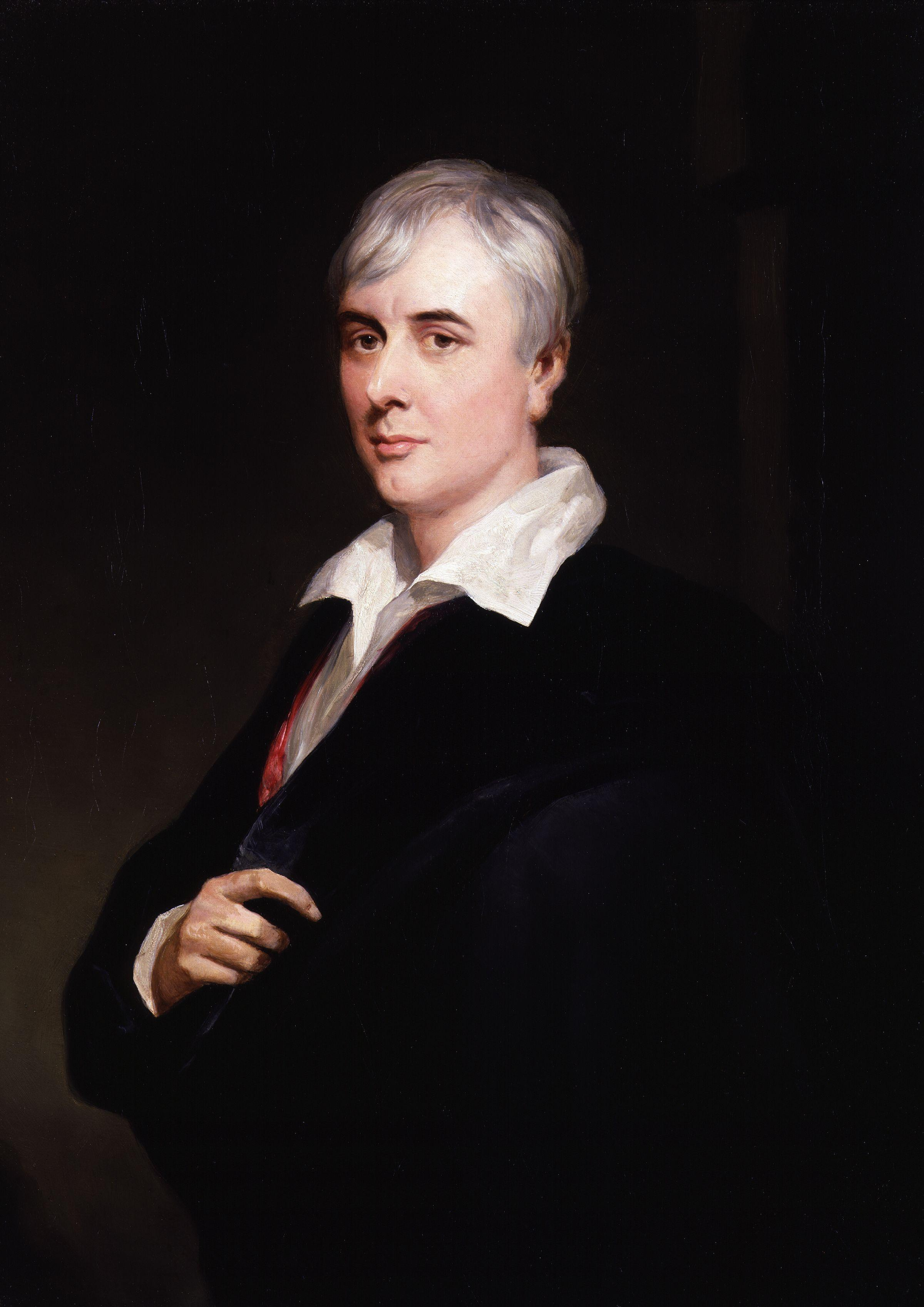
- Portrait by Henry Wyndham Phillips, 1843
- Born: 5 July 1803; East Dereham, Norfolk
- Died: 26 July 1881 (aged 78); Lowestoft, Suffolk
- Occupation: Author
- Notable work: The Bible in Spain (1843); Lavengro (1851); Romany Rye (1857); Wild Wales (1862)
- Spouse: Mary Clarke (?–1869)
- Parents: Ann Perfrement; Thomas Borrow

George Henry Borrow (5 July 1803 – 26 July 1881) was an English writer of novels and of travel based on personal experiences in Europe. His travels gave him a close affinity with the Romani people of Europe, who figure strongly in his work. His best-known books are The Bible in Spain and the novels Lavengro and The Romany Rye, set in his time with the English Romanichal (Gypsies).

== Early life ==
Borrow was born at East Dereham, Norfolk, the son of Thomas Borrow (1758–1824), an army recruiting officer, and Ann Perfrement (1772–1858), a farmer's daughter. His father, a lieutenant with the West Norfolk Militia, was quartered at the prisoner-of-war camp at Norman Cross from July 1811 to April 1813, and George spent his ninth and tenth years in the barracks there. He was educated at the Royal High School of Edinburgh and Norwich Grammar School.

Borrow studied law, but languages and literature became his main interests. In 1825, he began his first major European journey, walking in France and Germany. Over the next few years he visited Russia, Portugal, Spain and Morocco, acquainting himself with the people and languages of countries he visited. After his marriage on 23 April 1840, he settled in Lowestoft, Suffolk, but continued to travel inside and outside the United Kingdom.

== Borrow in Ireland ==
Having a military father, Borrow grew up at various army posts. In the autumn of 1815, he accompanied the regiment to Clonmel in Ireland, where he attended Clonmel Endowed School, a Protestant grammar school, and learned to read Latin and Greek from its sole master, Richard Carey, whom he later called "a nice old clergyman". He was also introduced to the Irish language by a fellow student named Murtagh, who tutored him in return for a pack of playing cards. In keeping with the political friction of the time, he learned to sing "the glorious tune 'Croppies Lie Down'" at the military barracks. He was introduced to horsemanship and learned to ride without a saddle. The regiment moved to Templemore early in 1816, and Borrow began ranging around the country on foot and later on horseback.

After less than a year in Ireland, the regiment returned to Norwich. As the threat of war receded, the strength of the unit was greatly reduced.

== Early career ==
Borrow's precocious linguistic skills as a youth made him a protégé of the Norwich-born scholar William Taylor, whom he depicted in his autobiographical novel Lavengro (1851) as an advocate of German Romantic literature. Recalling his youth in Norwich some 30 years earlier, Borrow depicted an old man (Taylor) and a young man (Borrow) discussing the merits of German literature, including Johann Wolfgang von Goethe's The Sorrows of Young Werther. Taylor confessed himself to be no admirer of the book or its author, but he stated, "It is good to be a German [for] the Germans are the most philosophical people in the world."

With Taylor's encouragement, Borrow embarked on his first translation, Friedrich Maximilian Klinger's version of the Faust legend, entitled Faustus, his Life, Death and Descent into Hell, first published in St Petersburg in 1791. In his translation, Borrow altered the name of one city, so making one passage of the legend read:

They found the people of the place modelled after so unsightly a pattern, with such ugly figures and flat features that the devil owned he had never seen them equalled, except by the inhabitants of an English town, called Norwich, when dressed in their Sunday's best.

For this lampooning of Norwich society, the Norwich public subscription library burned his first publication.

== Russian visit ==
As a linguist adept at acquiring new languages, Borrow informed the British and Foreign Bible Society, "I possess some acquaintance with the Russian, being able to read without much difficulty any printed Russian book."

He left Norwich for St Petersburg on 13 August 1833. Borrow was charged by the Bible Society with supervising a translation of the Bible into Manchu. As a traveller, he was overwhelmed by the beauty of St Petersburg: "Notwithstanding I have previously heard and read much of the beauty and magnificence of the Russian capital.... There can be no doubt that it is the finest City in Europe, being pre-eminent for the grandeur of its public edifices and the length and regularity of its streets."

During his two-year stay in Russia, Borrow called upon the writer Alexander Pushkin, who was out on a social visit. He left two copies of his translations of Pushkin's literary works and later Pushkin expressed regret at not meeting him.

Borrow described the Russian people as "the best-natured kindest people in the world, and though they do not know as much as the English, they have not the fiendish, spiteful dispositions, and if you go amongst them and speak their language, however badly, they would go through fire and water to do you a kindness."

Borrow had a lifelong empathy with nomadic people such as the Romany (or Gypsy) people, especially Romany music, dance and customs. He became so familiar with the Romany language as to publish a dictionary of it. In the summer of 1835, he visited Russian Roma camped outside Moscow. His impressions formed part of the opening chapter of his The Zincali: or an account of the Gypsies of Spain (1841). With his mission of supervising a Manchu translation of the Bible completed, Borrow returned to Norwich in September 1835. In his report to the Bible Society he wrote:

I quitted that country, and am compelled to acknowledge, with regret. I went thither prejudiced against that country, the government and the people; the first is much more agreeable than is generally supposed; the second is seemingly the best adapted for so vast an empire; and the third, even the lowest classes, are in general kind, hospitable, and benevolent.

== Spanish mission ==
Such was Borrow's success that on 11 November 1835 he set off for Spain, once more as a Bible Society agent. Borrow said that he stayed in Spain for nearly five years. His reminiscences of Spain were the basis of his travelogue The Bible in Spain (1843). He wrote:

[T]he huge population of Madrid, with the exception of a sprinkling of foreigners... is strictly Spanish, though a considerable portion are not natives of the place. Here are no colonies of Germans, as at Saint Petersburg; no English factories, as at Lisbon; no multitudes of insolent Yankees lounging through the streets, as at the Havannah, with an air which seems to say, the land is our own whenever we choose to take it; but a population which, however strange or wild, and composed of various elements, is Spanish, and will remain so as long as the city itself shall exist.

Borrow translated the Gospel of Luke into the Romani (Caló language) and Basque languages. These were published in 1838, but both translations were banned for personal sale, with only public libraries being permitted copies.

== Later life ==
In 1840 Borrow's career with the British and Foreign Bible Society came to an end, and he married Mary Clarke, a widow with a grown-up daughter called Henrietta, and a small estate at Oulton, Suffolk near Lowestoft. There Borrow began to write his books. The Zincali (1841) was moderately successful and The Bible in Spain (1843) was a huge success, making Borrow a celebrity overnight, but the eagerly awaited Lavengro (1851) and The Romany Rye (1857) puzzled many readers, who were not sure how much was fact and how much fiction – a question debated to this day. Borrow made one more overseas journey, across Europe to Istanbul in 1844, but the rest of his travels were in the UK: long walking tours in Scotland, Wales, Ireland, Cornwall and the Isle of Man. Of these, only the Welsh tour yielded a book, Wild Wales (1862).

Borrow's restlessness, perhaps, led to the family, which had lived in Great Yarmouth, Norfolk, in the 1850s, moving to London in the 1860s. Borrow visited the Romanichal encampments in Wandsworth and Battersea, and wrote one more book, Romano Lavo-Lil, a wordbook of the Anglo-Romany dialect (1874). Mary Borrow died in 1869, and in 1874 he returned to Lowestoft, where he was later joined by his stepdaughter Henrietta and her husband, who looked after him until his death there on 26 July 1881. He is buried with his wife in Brompton Cemetery, London.

Borrow was said to be a man of striking appearance and deeply original character. Although he failed to find critical acclaim in his lifetime, modern reviewers often praise his eccentric and cheerful style – "one of the most unusual people to have written in English in the last two hundred years" according to one.

== Museum and memorials ==
In 1913, the Lord Mayor of Norwich bought Borrow's house in Willow Lane. It was renamed Borrow House, presented to the City of Norwich, and for many years open to the public as the Borrow Museum. The museum was closed and the house sold in 1994, but the proceeds went to establish a George Borrow Trust that aims to promote his works.

There are memorial blue plaques marking his residences at 22 Hereford Square, South Kensington, Fjaerland Hotel, Trafalgar Road, Great Yarmouth, and the former museum in Willow Lane, Norwich. In December 2011, a plaque was unveiled on a house, 16, Calle Santiago, Madrid, where he lived from 1836 to 1840. George Borrow Road, a residential crescent in the west of Norwich, is named after him. There is a George Borrow Hotel in Ponterwyd near Aberystwyth. A pub in Dereham is named The Romany Rye after one of his principal works.

A ketch, the FV George Borrow (LT956), was named after him. Built in 1902, the George Borrow sailed until 1915, when it was destroyed by a German U-boat (the SM UB-10). The skipper of the George Borrow was Thomas Crisp, who, in 1917, would go on to be awarded a posthumous Victoria Cross.

Sir Arthur Conan Doyle pastiched Borrow's writing style in the short story"Borrow"-ed Scenes, first published in The Pall Mall Magazine in 1913, and later collected (as Borrowed Scenes) in Danger! and other stories (1918), and then Tales of Adventure and Medical Life (1922).

== Principal works ==
- The Zincali (1841)
- The Bible in Spain (1843)
- Lavengro (1851)
- The Romany Rye (1857)
- Wild Wales (1862)
- Romano Lavo-lil (1874) (A dictionary of the language of the English Romanichal people.)
