= The Zincali =

The Zincali: An Account of the Gypsies of Spain is a book written by George Borrow. The first edition was published in 1841. Nine editions were published until 1901 at which time the last (definitive) edition was published, but the book is still in print. In this work George Borrow writes about the living and culture of the Romani people especially in Spain. At the end of the book, a dictionary of the Romani language can be found. A lot of anecdotes of Borrow's encounter with this people are to be found in this book, which shows that he spoke the Romani language fluently and was even considered as one of them. In contrast to most modern works about the Romani people also the dark side of the Romani culture is discussed, like fraud and robbery, which were apparently common with the Romani people in the author's lifetime. Nevertheless, Borrow respected them highly and also mentioned the long history of their persecution in Europe and elsewhere.

== See also ==
- Gitanos
