= Edith Hume =

British painter and illustrator

- Born: Edith Dunn; 1841; Truro, United Kingdom
- Died: 1913 (aged 71–72)
- Known for: Painting
- Spouse: Thomas O. Hume (m. 1870)

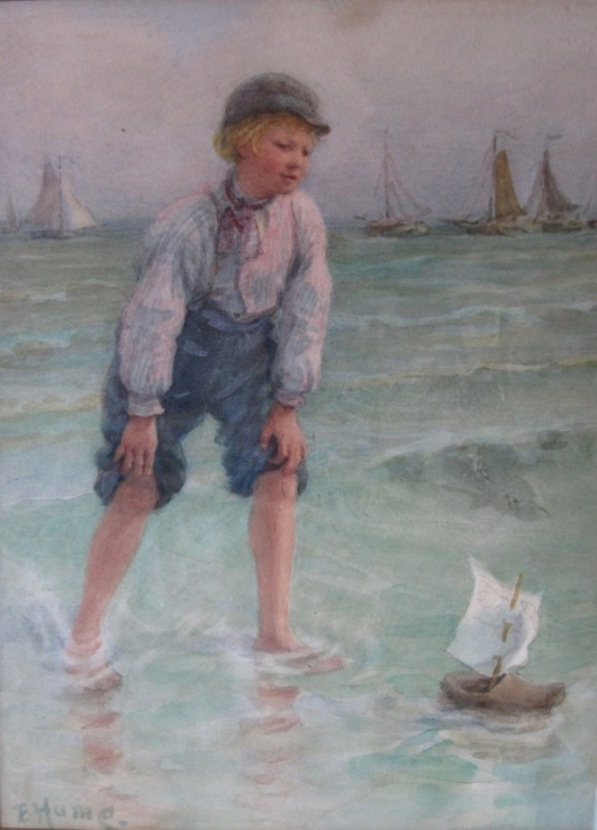
Dad's Boat

Edith Hume (1841–1913) was a British painter and illustrator.

== Life and career ==
Edith Dunn was born in 1841 in Truro. Her father was Henry Littlejohn Dunn, a grocer. She was part of an artistic family: her mother was an artist, her sister (Mrs. R. H. Carter) became a musician, and her brother, Henry Treffry Dunn, became a well-respected painter and a studio assistant to Dante Gabriel Rossetti.

Edith grew up in a Baptist household, and her father was religious and abstained from drinking.

Both her and her brother, Henry, were students at the Truro School of Art. They later studied in London at Heatherley’s School of Fine Art.

In 1870, Edith married the painter Thomas Oliver Hume.

She was active in the Netherlands during the years 1878–1906, creating beach scenes of Dutch fisher folk in Katwijk and Scheveningen as a follower of the Hague School. Her work was published in various periodicals, including Once a Week, London Society, and The British Workwoman.

Hume died on 21 June 1913, at the age of 72. She was buried four days later in Harting in Sussex.

== Gallery ==
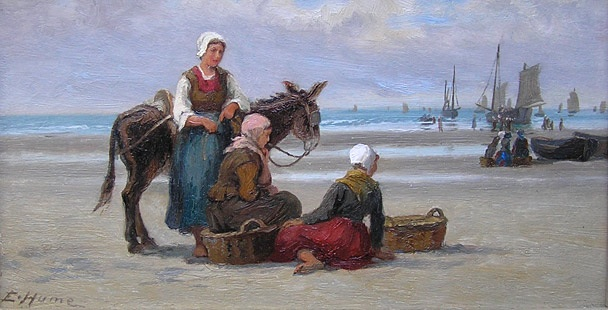
Fisherwomen at the beach (1890)

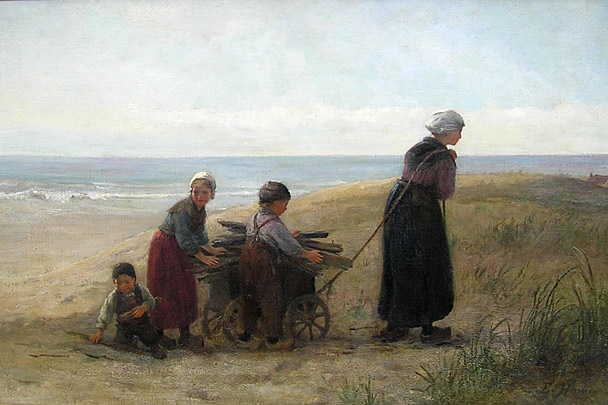
Children gathering wood (1890)
