= Thomas Collingwood (Jacobite) =

British Jacobite

Thomas Collingwood (1715–1781) was one of the few Northumbrians who gave active support to the Roman Catholic Charles Stuart ("Bonny Prince Charlie") in the 1745 Jacobite rising against the British crown. Thirty years after the unsuccessful rising under Charles' father James, the troops of King George II defeated the new generation of rebels, and punishments were meted out. Collingwood acquired some notoriety because he escaped from prison after being arrested on suspicion of treason and, after being recaptured, went on to be acquitted at trial.

== Early life ==
Thomas Collingwood’s Jacobite sympathies derived from the circumstances of his early life. He was born during 1715 in Whittingham Vale, an area of Northumberland inhabited by a number of powerful land-owners who were staunch Roman Catholics, sympathetic to James Stuart’s claim to the British throne. These squires were generous in offering tenancies on their estates to like-minded Catholics of lower rank, such as Thomas Collingwood’s father, John (c1675-1752). At the time of Thomas’ birth, John was a tenant of George Collingwood of Eslington (not a close relation). Moreover, a Jacobite rising had just erupted and it drew many Northumbrians, George Collingwood included, into fighting against the crown. When the Jacobite forces were defeated, the authorities chose to make an example of some of the leading gentry who had taken up arms, which resulted in George Collingwood being convicted of treason. He suffering grisly execution and his property was confiscated, events that cast a heavy shadow over Whittingham Vale. John Collingwood remained a tenant farmer on the Eslington estate for the rest of his life, so his son Thomas grew up in a community that was acutely aware of the government’s antipathy towards Jacobites, particularly those who were Catholics.

== Role in 1745 rising ==
Unlike its counterpart in 1715, the 1745 Jacobite rising was not actively supported by many Northumbrians. Most of those with Jacobite sympathies were fearfully aware of the penalties exacted upon those who had been found guilty of treason thirty years earlier, and so played safe by pleading loyalty to the crown or moving out of the area. However, a few Northumbrians went to fight with Charles Stuart in Scotland, while others operated a communications network in Northumberland, in which the Catholic landowner Allan Hodgson was an important figure.

Thomas Collingwood, also a Catholic, was part of that network. On 22 November 1745, three months after the rising began, he was arrested carrying a message to a rebel in Carlisle, as reported in the local newspaper, the Newcastle Courant:

On Saturday last was brought hither Thomas Collingwood, who was taken on the 22nd instant by one of the Cumberland Light Horse at the Swan, in Thirlwell gate, about 12 Miles off Carlisle. He had about him £114 and a Letter to one of the Rebels from A⸺n H⸺n, Esq., of Tone, near Hexham, in which was a List of those who subscribed towards the above Sum.

Collingwood was put in Morpeth jail, but soon escaped from custody, so that the same edition of the Newcastle Courant also carried notice of a reward for his capture:

Northumberland.—Whereas, Thomas Collingwood, son of ⸺ Collingwood, of Thrunton, in this County, was Committed on Wednesday last to the Gaol in and for the said County at Morpeth, for High Treason, and made his Escape from thence in the Night, between the 27th and 28th of this Instant November: these are therefore to Give Notice that if any Person or Persons shall apprehend the said Thomas Collingwood, and deliver him to the Keeper of the said Gaol, such Person or Persons shall have paid to him or them, by the Treasurer of this County, a Reward of £50. N.B.—The said Thomas Collingwood is a Person of Middle Stature, about Twenty-five Years of Age, has a round face and short nose, and wore when he escaped a light colour'd Wig, a dark Colour'd Coat, and a Silk Handkerchief about his Neck.

Collingwood was eventually recaptured, and was sent to Carlisle for trial, accused of rebellion. Bills of indictment were presented against him and a number of other prisoners at the assizes on 30 August 1746. However, at trial the prosecution failed to present its case properly and so Collingwood was acquitted without his precise role in the rising ever being formally established. It is not clear that he ever actually took up arms: he probably did no more than deliver messages.

== Later life ==
After the defeat in 1745, Jacobitism was a spent force. However, the authorities continued to suspect Catholics of sedition for decades afterwards, occasionally taking censuses of those who could be identified as “papists”, and not lifting the last of the penal laws until 1791. Nevertheless, Thomas Collingwood remained openly Catholic, and was noted, along with his wife and children, in the national Return of Papists taken in 1767 and in a local return for the parish of Ellingham in 1780.

Collingwood was a Northumbrian farmer for the remainder of his life. For most of that time, he was a tenant of Catholic landlords: first, Allan Hodgson of Tone (his co-conspirator in the 1745 rising); then Sir John Swinburne, who leased Collingwood land at Capheaton and later at Edlingham. For the last decade or so of his life, Collingwood owned a farm jointly with his brother Francis in North Charlton. In that township, Thomas was seen as a minor gentleman; for example, he was of sufficient standing to be appointed as Petty Constable for North Charlton in 1774. During his term of office, he arranged that a pauper woman, who had a child and was heavily pregnant, should be removed to the neighbouring township of Ellingham for the birth of her baby. This action meant that the people of North Charlton would no longer be responsible for her upkeep. However, the citizens of Ellingham lodged a formal complaint and in the local quarter sessions he was convicted of unlawful conduct.

Collingwood died in North Charlton on 6 March 1781, intestate and in debt. He was buried in the graveyard of Whittingham, alongside his parents and other relatives.

== Subsequent notoriety ==
In the late 19th century, two historians sympathetic to the Jacobite cause drew attention to Collingwood's contribution. The first, D. D. Dixon, a Northumbrian writing about his home area, recounted the deeds of many members of the Collingwood family, and noted that the Catholic, George Collingwood of Eslington, had been executed for his participation in the 1715 rising. Dixon then quoted the reward notice transcribed above, as evidence that in 1745 "the Jacobite spirit still burned within the hearts of the Collingwoods." The second author, R. J. Charleton, wrote Netherdyke, one of the few historical novels devoted to the second Jacobite rising. Its characters are mostly fictional, but "young Thomas Collingwood of Thrunton" makes a brief appearance among conspirators who are planning a race meeting, intended as a cover for a Jacobite rally. This novel portrays in some detail the part played by Northumbrians in the 1745 rising, carrying information between Bonnie Prince Charlie in Scotland and rebels in England.

In the present day, the Northumbrian Jacobite Society has documented the 19th-century revival of interest in the Jacobite movement and aims to keep that interest alive. In its account "Northumbrians in the '45", Thomas Collingwood is the first of only two named individuals who were active in the rising.
