= Atalanta in Calydon: And Lyrical Poems =

1901 collection of works by Algernon Charles Swinburne

Atalanta in Calydon: and lyrical poems
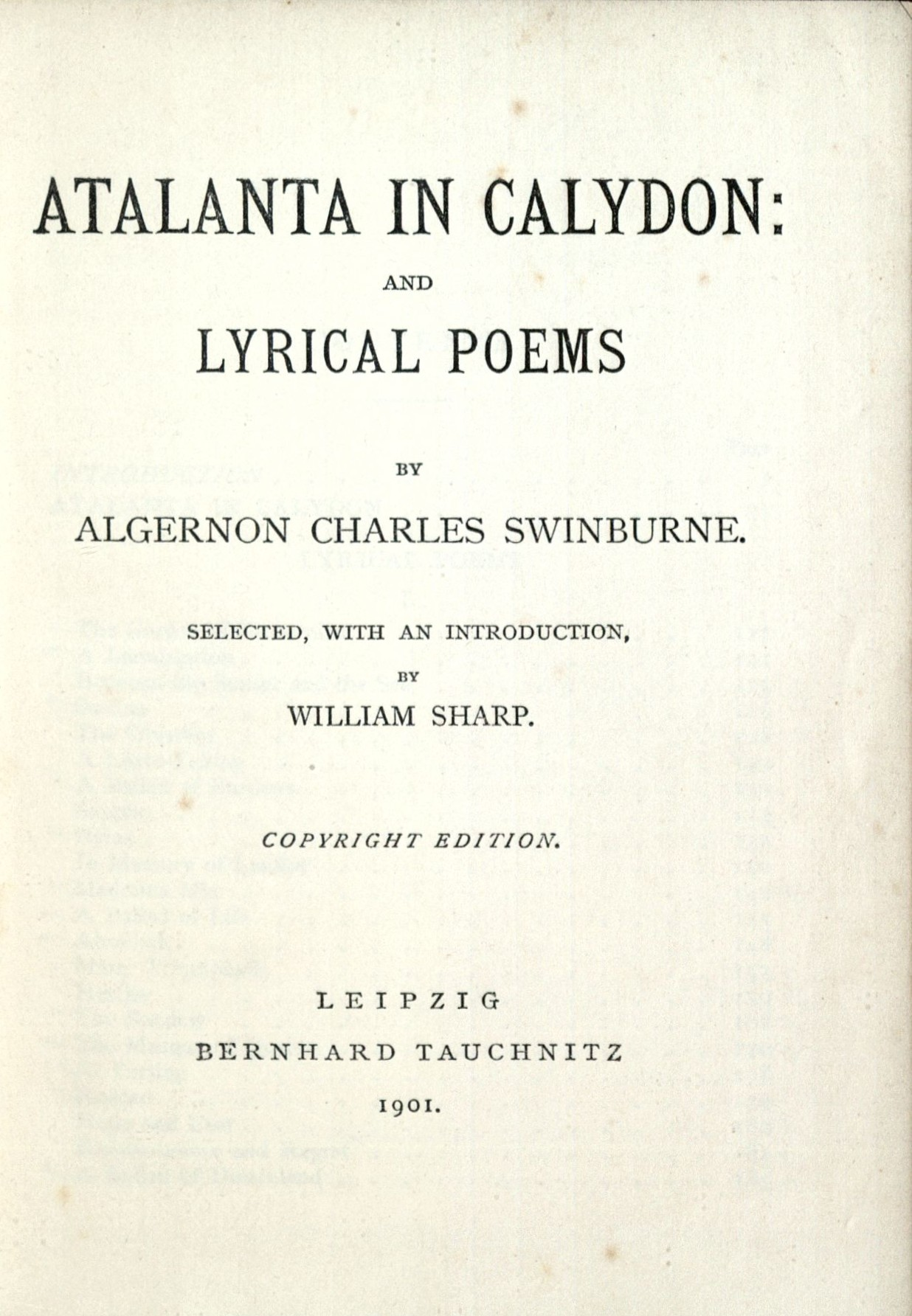
- Editor: William Sharp
- Author: Algernon Charles Swinburne
- Genre: Tragic play, lyric poetry
- Publication date: 1901

Atalanta in Calydon: And Lyrical Poems is a collection of works by Algernon Charles Swinburne, published in 1901 by William Sharp. It contains Swinburne's tragic play Atalanta in Calydon and several lyrical poems. Prominent themes of the book are nature, religion and agnosticism, as well as a critical perspective on existing gender and social norms.

The book was issued as part of the Tauchnitz Collection of British Authors (volume 3522), a 20th-century book series that distributed popular works by British authors on primarily non-British markets. At its publication, Atalanta in Calydon: And Lyrical Poems was the only largely available collection of Swinburne's poetry outside of the British Empire and the US. The book was produced in six printing runs between 1901 and 1928, without any major revisions made in-between the impressions.

== Context ==
Swinburne published his works primarily during the mid- and late Victorian era. While poetry and plays of the early Victorian era (1837–1851) had focused on themes such as religion, moral virtues and idealism, the mid-Victorian period (1851–1870) explored the growing conflicts between science and religion. The writing of the later Victorian period (1870–1901) continued to explore related themes such as agnosticism, and introduced a focus on social issues such as poverty, gender inequality and the impact of industrialization. Aside from Swinburne, other influential poets and playwrights during the mid- and late Victorian era are Thomas Hardy, Oscar Wilde and Alfred, Lord Tennyson.

Swinburne had started writing plays in his childhood, and throughout his time studying literature at Balliol College in Oxford he published several essays as well as poetry in a small university journal. During this university period he met and befriended several of the artists that would later influence and inspire his writings, such as Dante Rossetti, Edward Burne-Jones and William Morris. After leaving Balliol College without a degree, Swinburne officially began his career as an author. His first publication (the verse drama Catherine,1859) did not sell well, and subsequent publications of two other tragic plays (Queen Mother and Rosamond, 1860) were similarly unsuccessful. This changed with the publication of Atalanta in Calydon.

In 1865 Swinburne published the poetic drama Atalanta in Calydon, which marked the breakthrough of his work as a poet. Earning much praise, it quickly established Swinburne's literary reputation as a skilled poet, while receiving much criticism for its anti-theist themes. Later in 1865 Swinburne published the tragedy Chastelard, which was similarly reviewed with both praise as well as criticisms of impropriety. In 1866, Swinburne released Poems and Ballads, which hinted at themes such as sadomasochism, necrophilia, republicanism and lesbianism, and generated far more backlash and critical reviews than both previously published works. Songs before Sunrise, published in 1871, was viewed as blasphemous and offensive by critics at the time. Over the course of the 1870s Swinburne's reputation changed drastically, with his publications being increasingly well-received and his public image shifting towards that of a more respectable and less controversial figure. One explanation for this change in Swinburne's reputation are accompanying changes in his work, which over the decade shifted its focus away from themes that were considered offensive and controversial, towards more agreeable topics such as his patriotism for the British Empire, his fondness of children and fascination with Italy. An alternative explanation for this change in reception was a general shift in Victorian society towards more liberal and expressive values, as theorized by the Westminster review following Swinburne's publication of Poems and Ballads: Second Series in 1878. In 1887, Theodore Watts-Dunton published Selections from the poetical works of A. C. Swinburne, a collection of 39 poems and excerpts from Swinburnes' work. While Watts-Dunton explicitly stated that Swinburne was the one composing the selection in the prefaces of editions published after 1913, Swinburne himself has stated in private letters that the two men were involved in equal parts in selecting the works. The author Clive Simmonds has pointed out that this collection contains little of Swinburne's earlier and more controversial work such as Atalanta in Calydon or Poems and Ballads, despite the fact that these were the works that sold best and that Swinburne was most well known for throughout his career. Instead, the vast majority of the book consisted of the milder and more widely accepted poetry from the 1880s onwards. As Swinburne scholar Rikky Rooksby remarked: "It is difficult to imagine a more misleading selection. Selections from Swinburne whitewashed its author, with his erotic, antitheist, and republican poetry expunged from the record". This mirrored the public perception of the time, as the conservative critic Coventry Patmore stated in a review of the collection: "There is nothing in the Selections which a schoolgirl might not be permitted to read and understand, if she could".

Before publishing this book William Sharp had already established a reputation as a literary journalist and editor, and he was especially well known for his position as the general editor of the Canterbury Poets series, as well as for his anthologies Sonnets of the Century (1886) and American Sonnets (1889). Aside from Swinburne, Sharp edited poetry of Ossian, Walter Scott, Matthew Arnold and Eugene Lee-Hamilton. Sharp wrote several poetry volumes and novels himself, some of which were published under his pseudonym Fiona MacLeod. In early 1901, William Sharp proposed to Baron Tauchnitz to print a Swinburne collection as part of the Collection of British authors. Tauchnitz commissioned Sharp for the selection, and Sharp then informed Swinburne of the decision. In October 1901 William Sharp sent an early copy of the finished book to Swinburne for review.

== Contents ==
The book is structured into six parts: it begins with an introduction by the selector William Sharp, followed by the tragedy Atalanta in Calydon, which was included in its entirety. The rest of the book contains lyrical poems, which are grouped into parts I–IV.

In the introduction, Sharp provides the reader with a short biography of Swinburne's life, summing up biographical periods and writing about the influence that other poets and friends of Swinburne have had on the poet. In the latter part the author gives excerpts and background information for the poems and plays, and explains his reasons for including or excluding certain works.

Following the introduction is Atalanta in Calydon, which retells the Greek myth of the Calydonian boar hunt. In it, Artemis sends a wild boar to destroy the kingdom of Calydon as its king failed to include the goddess in the yearly offerings. A hunting party sets out to slay the boar, consisting of Meleager- the son of the queen of Calydon Althea, his uncles Toxeus and Plexippus, as well as the huntress Atalanta. Atalanta is the first one to injure the beast, so Meleager decides to offer her the hide after he has successfully killed the boar. His uncles take offense at this and in the subsequent fight, Meleager kills his uncles. Upon hearing the news his mother curses him, and both of them die.

The rest of the book gives an overview over Swinburne's lyrical work, divided into the following four sections:

- The first section contains mostly poems from Poems and Ballads (such as The Garden of Proserpine, Sappho, and Itylus), Songs Before Sunrise (Mater Triumphalis, Hertha, The Oblation) as well as an excerpt from Chastelard, thereby giving an overview of much of Swineburne's earlier work. Common themes include sexuality and gender roles, grief and Greek mythology.
- Section two primarily consists of Swinburne's later work, primarily Studies in Song (1880) and A Midsummer Holiday (1884). It contains works such as In the Water, Off Shore, By the North Sea and On the Verge, all of which are centered around the sea and ocean.
- The third section is composed of Swinburne's at the time most recent works, featuring works such as A Baby's Epitaph and The Bride's Tragedy (from Poems and Ballads, Third series,1889) as well as Life in Death and A Reminiscence (from Astrophel and other poems, 1894). This section includes themes such as childhood, grief and English patriotism.
- Section four mixes different poems and themes, drawing once again mostly from Swinburne's later work such as Astrophel and Other poems and A Midsummer Holiday. Here the reader finds poems such as the homage to the poet Charles Pierre Baudelaire titled Ave Atque Vale, nature-themed work such as the Nympholet and A Haven, as well as poetry centered around love, such as Song and An Old Saying.

After the publication, Swinburne wrote to William Sharp with comments on his editorial selections, expressing mixed feelings. While Swinburne's letter approves of the prominent inclusion of Nympholet as well as of the extract given from Anactoria, he expresses strong disapproval of the attention given to his earlier works: "I wish there were fewer of such very juvenile crudities as you have selected from my first volume of Poems: it is trying to find such boyish at tempts as The Sundew, Aholibah, Madonna Mia, etc., offered as examples of the work of a man who has written so many volumes since in which there is nothing that is not at least better and riper than they". In line with this, Swinburne expresses strong disapproval of the full inclusion of Atalanta in Calydon, stating: "I should greatly have preferred that extracts only should have been given from Atalanta in Calydon, which sorely needs compression in the earlier parts. Erechtheus, which would have taken up so much less space, would also, I venture to think, have been a better and a fairer example of the author's works". This was a common criticism Swinburne had of collections of his poetry; in 1883, in response to another author asking to include Atalanta in Calydon in his collection, Swinburne wrote: "And as for the first chorus in Atalanta, it has been reprinted so very much oftener than it deserves, that if the public is not tired of it, I am". Similarly to Erechtheus, Swineburne mentions several other works that he would have liked to see included but were missing from the collection, such as In the Bay and Super Flumina Babylonis. The omission of Super Flumina Babylonis was also criticized by Swinburne's friend and publisher, Watts-Dunton.

== Reception ==
The book has been received well, with William Sharp writing in a private letter that "[Swinburne's] Tauchnitz selection has won much appreciation". The practice of including Atalanta in Calydon in its entirety was adapted by many subsequent poetry collections of Swinburne throughout the 20th century. In an essay from 2016, Swinburne scholar Rikky Rooksby suggested that selecting poems from all stages of Swinburne's life for an anthology, as Atalanta in Calydon: and lyrical poems had done, constitutes a more modern and balanced approach, as opposed to 19th and 20th century collections of Swinburne's poetry which frequently and systematically excluded large parts of his work. For the more conservative editors, this was because Swinburne's earlier work was seen as immature, profane and not worth reading, which resulted in his works from before 1879 to be mostly missing from their collections. For another group of collectors the opposite was the case and the focus was on his earlier work, which was seen as transgressive and innovative. This belief is exemplified in T. S. Eliot's essay The Sacred Wood / Swinburne as a poet, in which he states that the poet's greatest works are Atalanta in Calydon as well as excerpts from Poems and Ballads, and that there are no specific other works that should necessarily be included in a collection. In his essay, Rikky Rooksby has expressed that selecting as widely as William Sharp had done distinguishes this book from many other Swinburne collections of the time, as well as from Selections from the poetical works of A. C. Swinburne. Since its publication, the book has been used as a reference in several French and English academic works on Swinburne.

Atalanta in Calydon: And Lyrical Poems was reprinted in six more runs. While it was soon added to contemporary English book collections such as the Thomas Hardy library collection, it also gained international attention, with several contemporary German literature journals reporting on its publication. The Tauchnitz publishing house went on to issue more of Swinburne's work, later printing six more books entailing his poetry and plays: Love's Cross-Currents (1905), Chastelard and Mary Stuart (1908), Atalanta in Calydon (1916), Chastelard (1916), Lyrical Poems (1916) and Mary Stuart (1916).

Two months after the publication of Atalanta in Calydon: And Lyrical Poems Sharp wrote an article on the relationship between Swinburne and Watts-Dunton, who Swinburne was living with at the time. The article titled "A Literary friendship: Mr. Swinburne and Mr. Watts-Dunton at the Pines" was published in December 1901 in the Pall Mall Magazine. In the following years Sharp went on to write several more poetic and narrative works under his pseudonym Fiona MacLeod, and later composed a selection of Fiona's stories for the 1902 Tauchnitz anthology "Wind and Wave: Collected Tales" (volume 3609), before passing away in December 1905 as a result of long-standing health issues.

In the years following the publication of Atalanta in Calydon: and lyrical poems Swinburne collaborated with his publisher Andrew Chatto to compose two more collections of his poetry: The Poems of Algernon Charles Swinburne (1904) appeared in six volumes, The Tragedies of Algernon Charles Swinburne (1905) consisted of five volumes. While these books taken together were a complete collection of Swinburne's previous work, they also contained as of then unpublished writing such as The Heptalogia (with Additions) and A Channel Passage, and other poems, as well as an introduction written by Swinburne himself. Swinburne's works remained popular, and he was nominated for the Nobel Prize in Literature every year from 1903 up until his death in 1909.
