= Kirkheaton, Northumberland =

Coordinates: 55.092°N 1.978°W

Kirkheaton
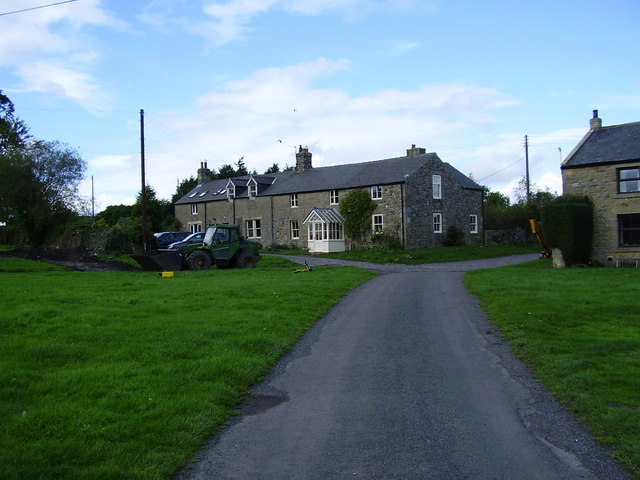
- Kirkheaton

- Location within Northumberland
- OS grid reference: NZ015775
- Civil parish: Capheaton
- Unitary authority: Northumberland
- Ceremonial county: Northumberland
- Region: North East
- Country: England
- Sovereign state: United Kingdom
- Post town: NEWCASTLE UPON TYNE
- Postcode district: NE19
- Dialling code: 01830
- Police: Northumbria
- Fire: Northumberland
- Ambulance: North East
- UK Parliament: Berwick-upon-Tweed

Kirkheaton (English: /ˈkərkhiːtən/) is a village and former civil parish, now in the parish of Capheaton, in the county of Northumberland, England. The village lies about 10 miles (16 km) north east of Hexham and about 5 miles (8 km) west of Belsay. In 1951 the parish had a population of 70.

== Governance ==
Kirkheaton is in the parliamentary constituency of Hexham. On 1 April 1955 the parish was abolished and merged with Capheaton.

== Landmarks ==
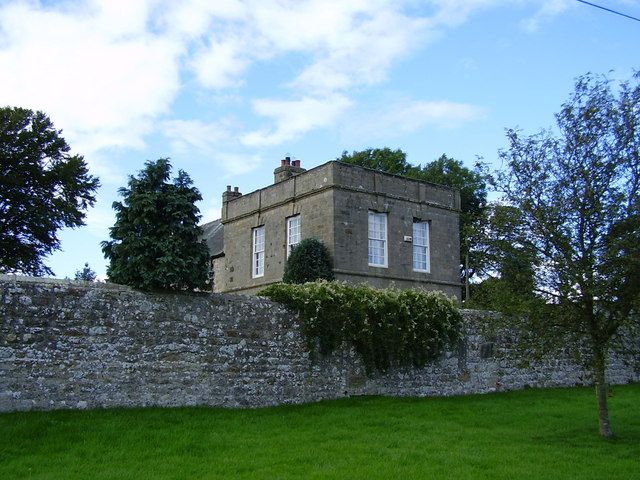
Kirkheaton Manor

Kirkheaton Manor is a bastle house in the village.

The Devil's Causeway passes the village just over 1 mile (2 km) to the east. The causeway is a Roman road which starts at Port Gate on Hadrian's Wall, north of Corbridge, and extends 55 miles (89 km) northwards across Northumberland to the mouth of the River Tweed at Berwick-upon-Tweed.

== History ==
=== 1999 Tornado crash ===
At Matfen on the morning of Thursday 14 October 1999, Tornado ZD809, of 15 Sqn, crashed killing the crew. Both pilots were 30, and from RAF Lossiemouth.

- Flt Lt Richard Ashley Wright, of Harriat Hayes Road, Codsall Wood, Wolverhampton, he was married three children aged 5, 2 and 6 months; he had attended Wolverhampton Grammar School, and Liverpool University Air Squadron, and was training to be a weapons instructor on the Tornado; his 62 year old father, Alan, was a former RAF navigator
- Flt Lt Sean Patrick Casabayo, from Plymouth

== Religious sites ==
The church is dedicated to St Bartholomew. The chapel was rebuilt in 1775, at the expense of Mrs H. D. Windsor, at that time lady of the manor.
