= Sir John Swinburne, 6th Baronet =

English politician (1762-1860)

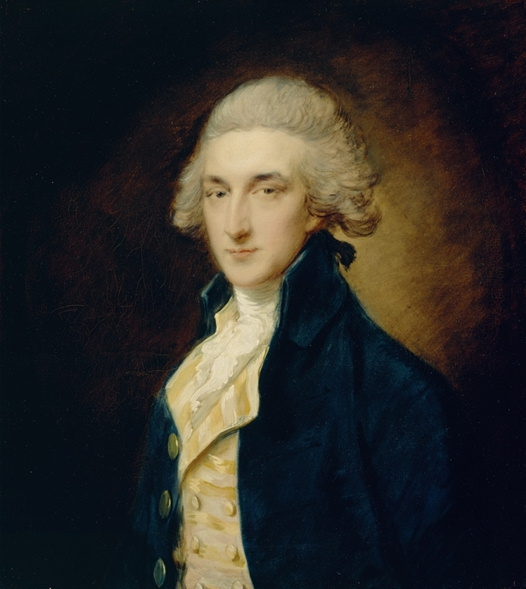
John Swinburne, 1785 painting by Thomas Gainsborough.

Sir John Edward Swinburne, 6th Baronet FRS FSA (6 March 1762 – 26 September 1860) was an English politician and patron of the arts.

== Life ==
He was born at Bordeaux. The Swinburne family of Capheaton Hall was traditionally Roman Catholic and Jacobite, but at age 25 Swinburne inherited the baronetcy and went into politics as a Protestant Whig. He became Member of Parliament for Launceston in 1788. There was a vacancy there, because the sitting MP George Rose had accepted an office under the Crown, and had to step down; Swinburne from 1786 had intended to stand for Northumberland, but Hugh Percy, 2nd Duke of Northumberland managed his selection for the Cornwall constituency. He went no further in Parliament, but remained a political leader in Northumberland, and an associate of Charles Grey who was elected for the constituency in 1786.

Swinburne was a supporter of most reforms associated with the Whigs, including reapportioning Parliamentary representation and abolishing the slave trade. He generally endorsed the goals of the French Revolution to establish civil rights and democracy. In 1793 Swinburne learned of a British government effort to undermine France's economy with counterfeit currency, which he discovered included the involvement of the Duke of York, commander of the British army in Flanders; Brook Watson, a Bank of England director; and William Playfair, a Tory writer who Swinburne said was managing the effort. Swinburne reported the activity to Grey, contributing to its disclosure in Parliament by Richard Brinsley Sheridan.

Swinburne completed the work on the north front of Capheaton Hall envisaged by his father. It was carried out by William Newton.

He was a Fellow of the Royal Society, Fellow of the Society of Antiquaries of London, and the first president of the Society of Antiquaries of Newcastle upon Tyne.

== Patron ==
He was a patron to William Mulready: they shared an enthusiasm for boxing. Mulready taught the Swinburne family and painted their portraits. He also supported John Hodgson, who referred in his History of Northumberland to Swinburne as a "munificent contributor to the embellishments and materials of this work".

Swinburne was also president of the Artists' Benevolent Fund.

== Family ==
He married Emma, daughter of Richard Henry Alexander Bennet of Babraham, Cambridgeshire, on 13 July 1787; she was a niece of Frances Julia (née Burrell, daughter of Peter Burrell), second wife of the 2nd Duke of Northumberland. Their children were:

- Edward (1789–?), who married Anna Antonia Sutton (1801–1845) in 1819; 7 children, among them Sir John Swinburne, 7th Baronet.
- Charles Henry (1797–1877), Royal Navy officer; he married Jane Henrietta, daughter of George Ashburnham, 3rd Earl of Ashburnham, and they had six children, of whom the first was the poet Algernon Charles Swinburne.
- Elizabeth (1790–1790);
- Julia (1795–);
- Emily Elizabeth (1798– ), who married Henry George Ward in 1824;
- Frances (1799–1821);
- Elizabeth (1805–1896), married John William Bowden in 1828.

He died, aged 98, in December 1860.

== Arms ==
Coat of arms of Sir John Swinburne, 6th Baronet
Crest Out of a ducal coronet Or a demi-boar rampant Argent crined of the First, langued Gules. Escutcheon Per fess Gules and Argent three cinquefoils Counterchanged Motto Semel Et Semper (Once And Always)

== Notes ==
Baronetage of England
Preceded by Edward Swinburne	Baronet (of Capheaton); 1786–1860	Succeeded by John Swinburne
