= Sir John Swinburne, 7th Baronet =

British politician (1831–1914)

Sir John Swinburne Bt
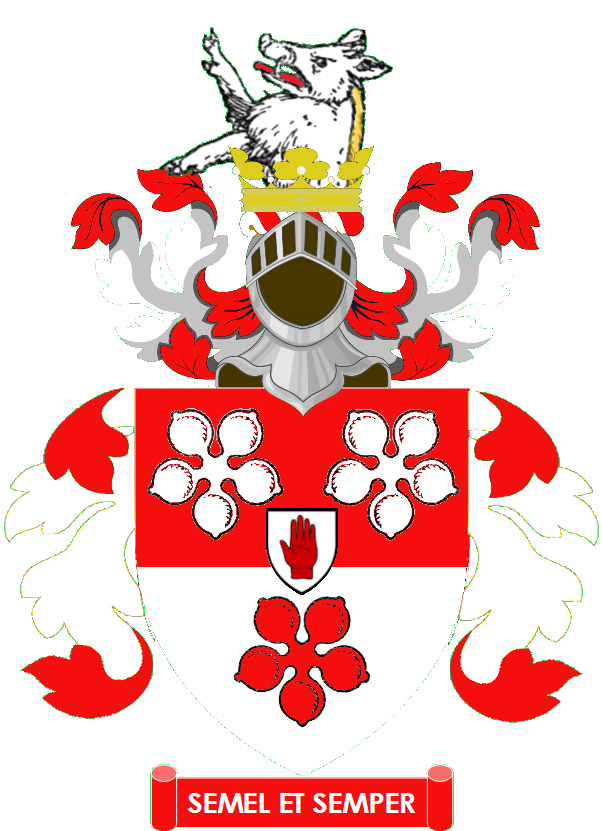

Member of Parliament for Lichfield
- In office 1885–1892
- Preceded by: Theophilus John Levett
- Succeeded by: Leonard Darwin

Personal details
- Born: 1831
- Died: 1914 (aged 82–83)
- Party: Liberal

Sir John Swinburne, 7th Baronet (1831 – 15 July 1914) was a British Baronet and Liberal politician.

== Life ==
The third son of Edward Swinburne and his wife Anna Antonia Sutton, a granddaughter of Sir Richard Sutton, 1st Baronet, he succeeded his grandfather Sir John Edward Swinburne, 6th Baronet in 1860.

Swinburne was High Sheriff of Northumberland in 1866 and the Member of Parliament for Lichfield, Staffordshire, between 1885 and 1892. In the 1895 general election he stood as the parliamentary candidate for the Liberal Party in Newbury, but was not elected.

His daughter, Rahmeh Theodora Swinburne, married General Percy Radcliffe.

Coat of arms of Sir John Swinburne, 7th Baronet

Crest
Out of a ducal coronet Or a demi-boar rampant Argent crined of the First, langued Gules.
Escutcheon
Per fess Gules and Argent three cinquefoils Counterchanged
Motto
Semel Et Semper (Once And Always)

== See also ==
- Swinburne Baronets

== Notes ==
Parliament of the United Kingdom
| Preceded by Theophilus John Levett | Member of Parliament for Lichfield; 1885–1892 | Succeeded by Leonard Darwin |
Baronetage of England
| Preceded by John Edward Swinburne | Baronet (of Capheaton); 1860–1914 | Succeeded by Hubert Swinburne |
