= La Soeur de la reine =

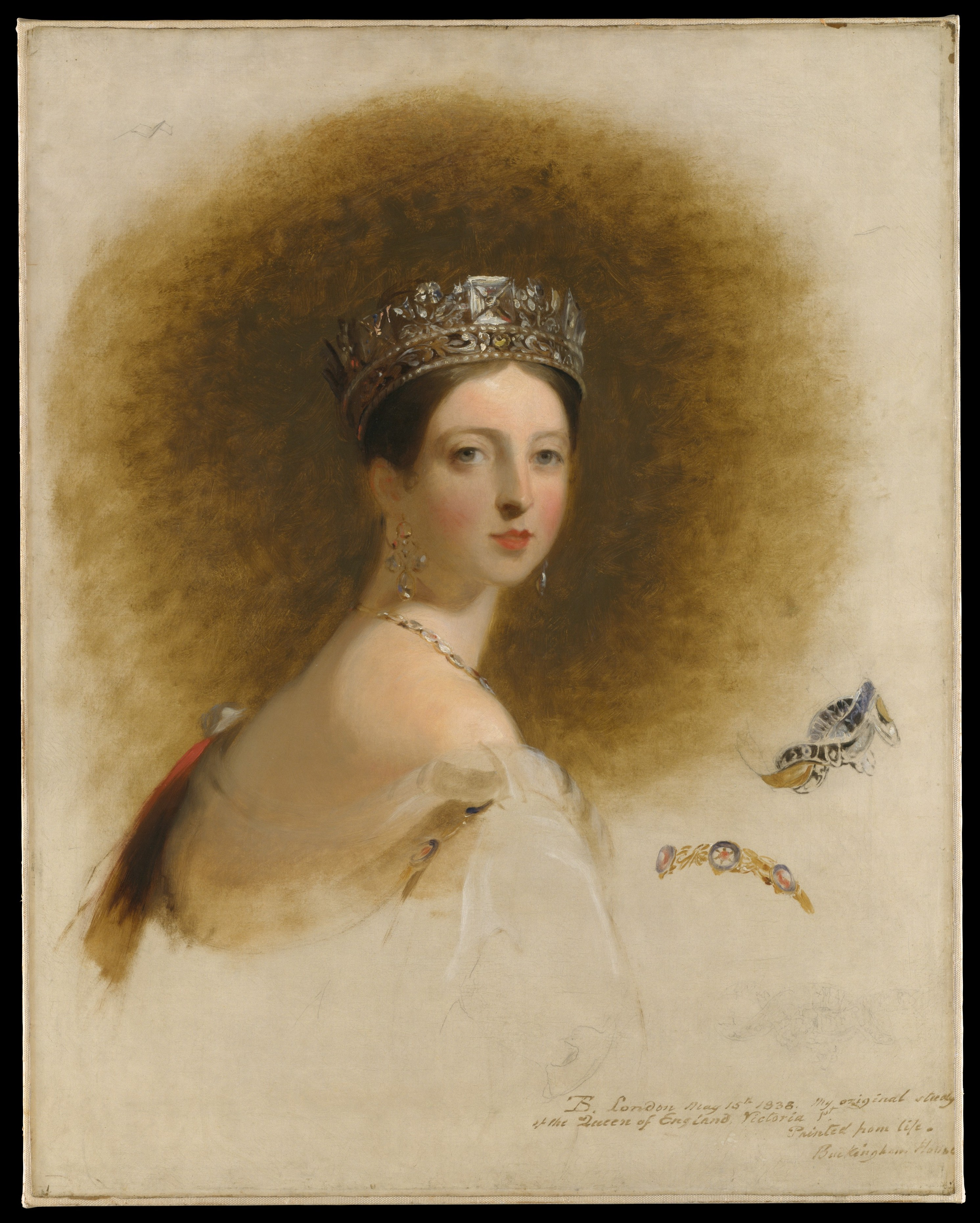
Queen Victoria (1838) by Thomas Sully

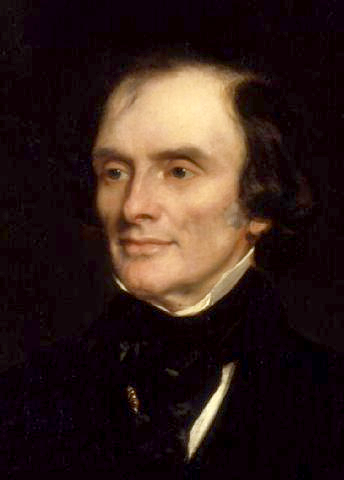
Detail from John Russell, 1st Earl Russell (1853) by Francis Grant

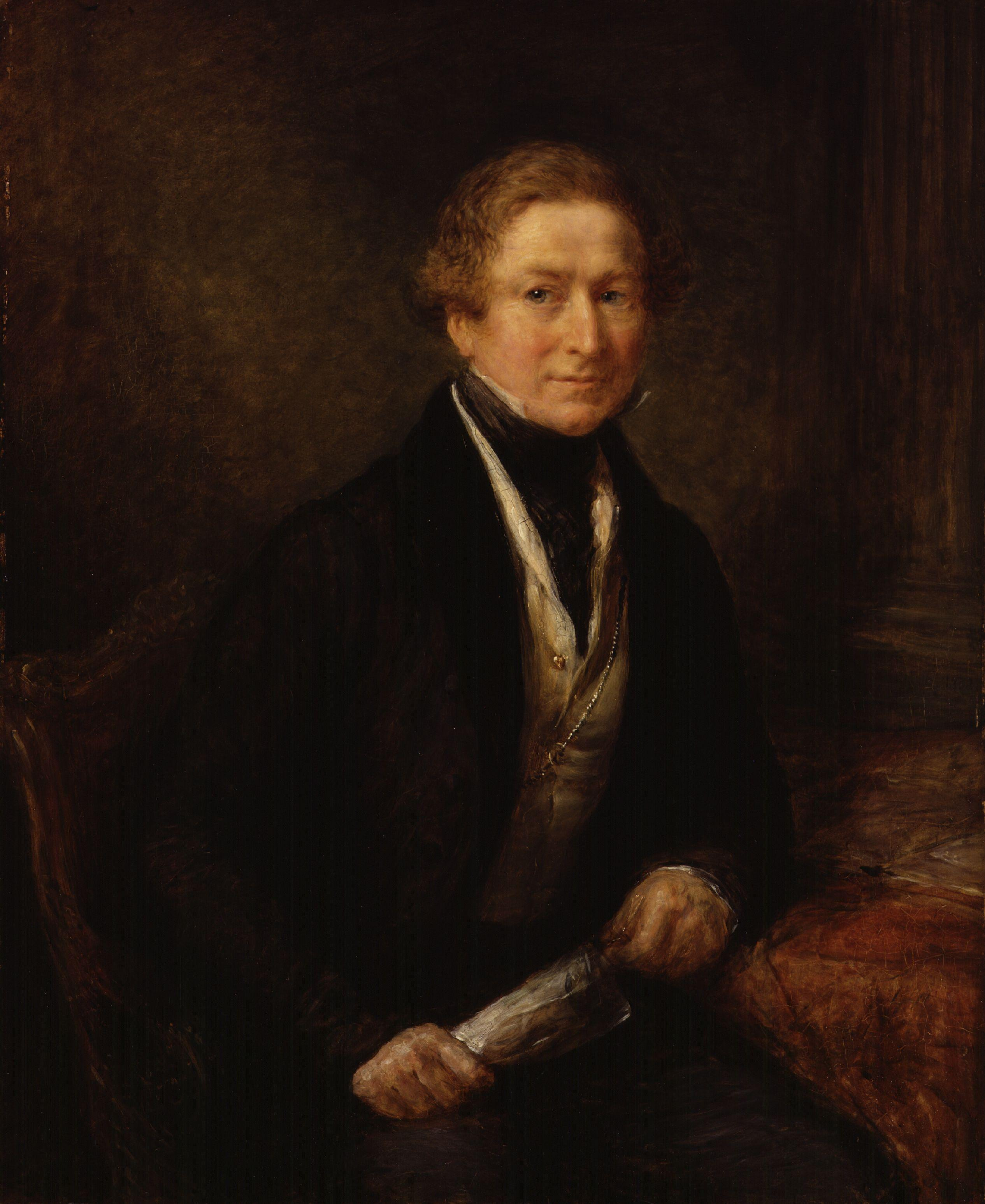
Portrait of Sir Robert Peel by John Linnell, 1838

La Soeur de la reine is a burlesque French-language play written by Algernon Charles Swinburne in the 1860s. The comedy of the piece derives from its parody of the full-bloodedly Romantic style of Victor Hugo's prose plays, and from its portrayal of a profligate and tyrannical Queen Victoria whose numerous affairs with her prime ministers and with William Wordsworth are the scandal of the age. Though Swinburne sometimes read from the play to his friends, for whose amusement it was primarily intended, he did not publish it, and the surviving manuscripts, comprising Acts 2 and 4 (the latter perhaps incomplete), were not published until 1964. It is now considered a triumph of satirical humour.

== Synopsis of the surviving text ==
=== Act 2 ===
Inside Buckingham House Sir Peel tells the Duchess of Kent how much he adores the queen and suffers at seeing her in the arms of Lord John Russell. The Duchess, alarmed, warns him that in George IV's time one Lord Badger was hanged for merely embracing the prudish Queen Caroline. Sir Peel threatens to kill Russell, and repeats his protestations of devotion. He begs the duchess to intercede for him, then rages at the many lovers the queen has taken: Lord Palmerston, Bright, the Earl of Derby and others. The duchess promises that she will win him her daughter's love provided he returns to her the daughter he has taken and whom she has these eighteen years yearned for. Sir Peel tells her that the queen is her only daughter, but the duchess protests that he lies: her younger daughter lives! Her elder daughter, the queen, has dragged her virginal crown through the gutter, but the duchess begs for the younger one – her dove! her angel! Lord John Russell is heard outside singing of love, and as Sir Peel hastily exits Russell and the queen enter. The duchess tries to persuade the queen not to compromise herself with other men, but the queen retorts that they should each concern themselves with what they do best, politics for the duchess and love for herself. The duchess, furious, exits. The queen accuses Russell of sulking, but her own blood is aflame in spite of his frowns. He is young and beautiful, but she would rather he were old and ugly so long as he were faithful and loving. She never knows if he takes to another's bed the lips she has kissed. Russell tells her how much he suffers from knowing of her previous lovers; she replies that they may have possessed her body but only he has her heart. Russell says he is not jealous of her gentlemanly lovers, but only of the first, that miserable scrawler Wordsworth. The queen recalls how, when she was 16, Wordsworth had seduced her by reading from his intoxicating and sensual poems: one on his unbridled excursion through fields burning with love, and another his erotic song of Betty Foy. But Russell should not begrudge him his quarter hour of joy. After mutual reproaches Russell threatens to reveal the secrets of the queen's bed to the world. The queen warns him that she has ordered Dr. Ballok, the Head Master of Eton, to be hanged simply for teaching his pupils the story of Messalina. She asks Russell to swear that he has loved no other woman. He does so, and they fall into each other's arms. Sir Peel enters to tell them that it is time for the grand lever. A throng of courtiers enter and are announced, the last being Miss Kitty, whom Sir Peel identifies as a prostitute, the duchess as the queen's sister, Sir Peel as Russell's mistress, and the Lord Mayor of London as his own wife.

=== Act 4 ===
Lord Gotobed, Lord Butters and Sir Chump are conversing in Buckingham House. They have heard it said that the Lord Mayor's marriage has ended on account of his impotence, and that he is a broken man. Sir Chump has seen the Mayor's distraught wife throwing herself at the queen's feet. Lord Butters says that Peel has discovered an old law which disqualifies unchaste women from the throne. Sir Chump is indignant that more chastity is expected from poor women than from the reigning queen: England's hypocrisy makes her a laughing-stock! He angrily exits. The queen enters on Sir Peel's arm and dismisses Gotobed and Butters. She complains to Peel that she is constantly maligned, that she suffers – but does she not have powers of redress, does she not have hangmen? She has had Sir Burdett shot and Dean Smith poisoned. Though surrounded by dangers she has always faced them down without bending the knee or taking a step back; but now she trembles and staggers. Sir Peel confesses that he loves her and, when she asks if he would commit crime for her, replies that he would serve her to the death. The queen, calling him now by his first name, Roberts, says she is his for life, then asks him to kill that shameless strumpet Princess Kitty. He protests, but finally agrees. "Poor mother!" the queen remarks. "It will be a frightful shock for her."

== Composition and dissemination ==
La Soeur de la reine seems to have been initially composed in the early or middle 1860s, though Swinburne may perhaps have developed his conception of the work through subsequent years. The earliest evidence for it appears in a letter Swinburne wrote to his friend William Bell Scott in January 1861 in which he described

a tale which I have vaguely conceived already. A twin sister of Queen Victoria, kidnapped on her birth by consent of the late Sir R. Peel and Lord Chancellor Eldon for political reasons – to remove a rival candidate for the throne – grows up a common prostitute – is discovered in The Haymarket by the Lor Maire on a profligate excursion – informed of her origin claims her rights – is confronted with queen – queen swoons – the proofs of her birth bought and destroyed – the Abp of Canterbury solemnly perjures himself to the effect that she is an imposter – finally consumed by an ill-requited attachment to Lord John Russell, the heroine charcoals herself to death.

The play was intended largely as an amusement for his friends and was improvised at speed, as is demonstrated by the fact that, in spite of Swinburne's fluency in French, the text contains many errors of grammar and spelling. There are stories of his reading the play to a party of undergraduates, and even to the presumably unshockable Pauline, Lady Trevelyan. Rumours of the play's existence are known to have spread more widely at second hand, as from Edmund Gosse and others to A. E. Housman, and from an unnamed friend of Swinburne's to John Bailey, and indeed in 1875 a London newspaper, The Daily News, mentioned the character, "[l]a Princesse Kitty in an unacted French melodrama by a living English poet".

== Manuscript and other evidences of the text ==
Swinburne's executor, Theodore Watts-Dunton, told the bibliographer T. J. Wise that La Soeur de la reine was "shockingly improper" and that no text of it survived. In 1959 the scholar Cecil Y. Lang wrote that parts of the manuscript did survive in a private collection, and five years later he published this manuscript, by then held by the Library of Congress. He stated that this consisted of ten leaves, watermarked 1861 and 1862, and described the text as the probably complete second act and probably incomplete fourth act of the play. One further leaf of manuscript was quoted in print as early as 1928. It was acquired by the English novelist Hugh Walpole, and after his death was bought by Houghton Library at Harvard. In 1973 it was published by Francis Jacques Sypher, who identified it as a missing passage from Act 2, scene 3.

Swinburne gave, in an 1880 letter to Lord Houghton, a summary of the Wordsworth passage in Act 2, scene 3. Further memories of the plot of a burlesque Swinburne play about Queen Victoria can be found in the works of various early 20th century writers. John Bailey set down in a 1917 diary entry an account, gained at second hand, of the same passage. W. H. Mallock, in a memoir published in 1920, included an extended reminiscence of a student party at which Swinburne had summarised his play. The first act, Mallock wrote, showed "England on the verge of a revolution...due to the frightful orgies of the Queen". Miss Kitty he remembered as being the daughter of the queen and Lord John Russell, and as being described by a princely admirer in these words: "She may...have done everything which might have made a Messalina blush, but whenever she looked at the sky she murmured 'God' and whenever she looked at a flower she murmured 'mother.'" In 1925 Julian Osgood Field, who had known Swinburne in his youth, wrote of his "unpublished, in fact unwritten, parody of Victor Hugo [called] La Princesse Katy, which the little bard used to recite to his intimates." In this play the title character was the rightful queen of England, while Victoria was illegitimate. The last act, he said, took place in Victoria's bedroom.

She has just been confined of the Heir Apparent and Sir Locock is with her. Her Majesty dismisses him. She is agitated: she has heard of Princess Katy and knows she is the rightful Queen. What is to be done? Obviously destroy Katy. So she sends for the Public Hangman and tells him he must do away with this dangerous young lady. He, gentilhomme quand même [a gentleman for all that], refuses to do so vile a deed, but falls on his knees before the Sovereign as he murmurs that he cannot obey her. Then says Victoria, "Levez-vous, Sir Calcraft, Pair d'Angleterre! [Arise, Sir Calcraft, Peer of England!]" But the glorious fellow rises proudly and puts aside the tempting honour – "Pardon, Madame: je ne suis que le bourreau de Londres! [Excuse me, Madam: I am only the London hangman!]".

All of these testimonia, even Swinburne's own, show disparities with the known manuscript text of La Soeur de la reine which could perhaps be explained by the passage of time and the fallibility of human memory, but one scholar, Gillian Workman, suggests the possibility of a second, now lost, Swinburne burlesque play about Victoria called, just as Field remembered, La Princesse Katy. Both plays, along with his novel La Fille du policeman and perhaps yet other "Victorian" jeux d'esprit, might have evolved over a long period of time, influencing each other in their plot-elements.

== Sources and analogues ==
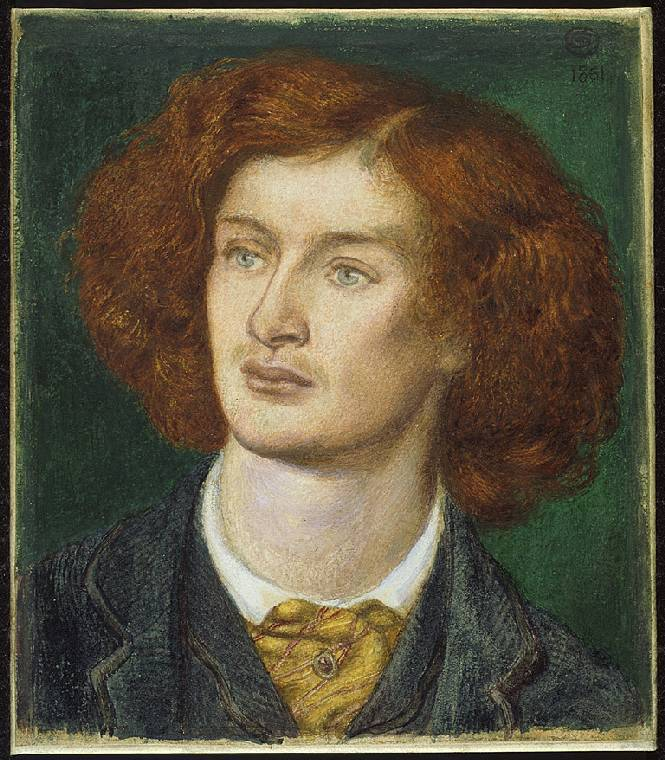
Algernon Charles Swinburne (1861) by Dante Gabriel Rossetti

La Soeur de la reine is a play inspired by the rhetoric of Victor Hugo's works, notably by his play Marie Tudor. That this is the object of his parody is especially clear at the opening of Act 2, scene 3, where Victoria's lovemaking with Russell parallels Mary's with Fabiano Fabiani in Act 2, scene 1 of Hugo's play. The tirades in La Soeur de la reine also seem to be parodies of those in Hugo's novel L'Homme qui rit. Other influences have been suggested, such as Alexandre Dumas' Kean and similar French plays drawing on their authors' limited knowledge of English life. The quaint names of some of Swinburne's minor characters – the Duchess of Fuckingstone, the Marquis of Bumbelly, milady Quim and so on – perhaps draw on the tradition of Restoration comedy. Cecil Lang also claimed that there are similarities in style and technique between La Soeur de la reine and a Victorian genre of orally disseminated comic tales known as "Irish Court Scenes".

== Criticism ==
La Soeur de la reine has been widely acclaimed by critics for its "delicious humor" and "unique radiance and verve"; it has been called a "rollicking skit", "one of Swinburne's brightest jester's caps" and, by Mario Praz, a jewel of parody. It succeeds as humour, wrote Thomas E. Connolly, in a way Swinburne could never manage when writing in English. John A. Cassidy linked Swinburne's hostility to 19th-century "prudery and pomposity" in this and his other burlesques with his adoption of Pre-Raphaelite and Baudelairean principles, seeing all as expressions of the same impulse. Gail Turley Houston likewise read his depiction of Victoria's profligacy as an attack on conventional social attitudes, but also saw in this subversion of Victoria's respectability and authority a clue to his own insecurity over his sexual and creative potency, which for Swinburne were always linked.
