= Capheaton =

Village and civil parish in England

Coordinates: 55°07′03″N 1°56′50″W

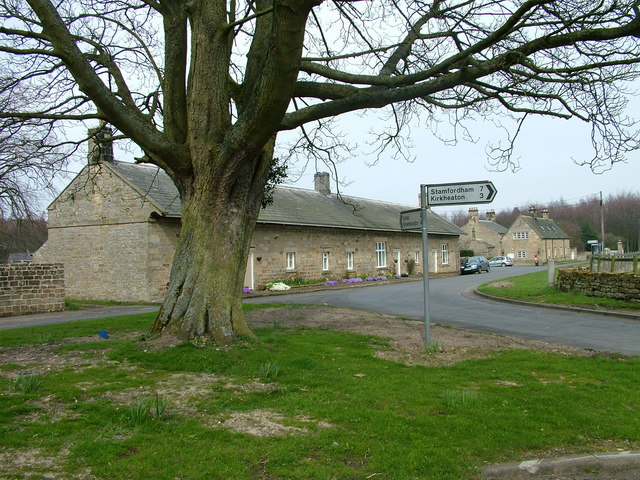
- Capheaton

- Location within Northumberland
- Population: 160 (2001 census)
- OS grid reference: NZ038804
- Unitary authority: Northumberland
- Ceremonial county: Northumberland
- Region: North East
- Country: England
- Sovereign state: United Kingdom
- Post town: NEWCASTLE UPON TYNE
- Postcode district: NE19
- Dialling code: 01830
- Police: Northumbria
- Fire: Northumberland
- Ambulance: North East
- UK Parliament: North Northumberland

Capheaton is a village and civil parish in Northumberland, England, about 25 miles (40 km) to the northwest of Newcastle upon Tyne. The population at the 2001 census was 160, increasing to 175 at the 2011 Census. It was built as a planned model village in the late eighteenth century. The name Capheaton derives from Caput Heaton, i.e., Heaton Magna, nearby Kirkheaton being the original Heaton Parva.

The Capheaton archives are at the Northumberland Record Office.

== Governance ==
Capheaton is in the parliamentary constituency of Berwick-upon-Tweed.

== Landmarks ==
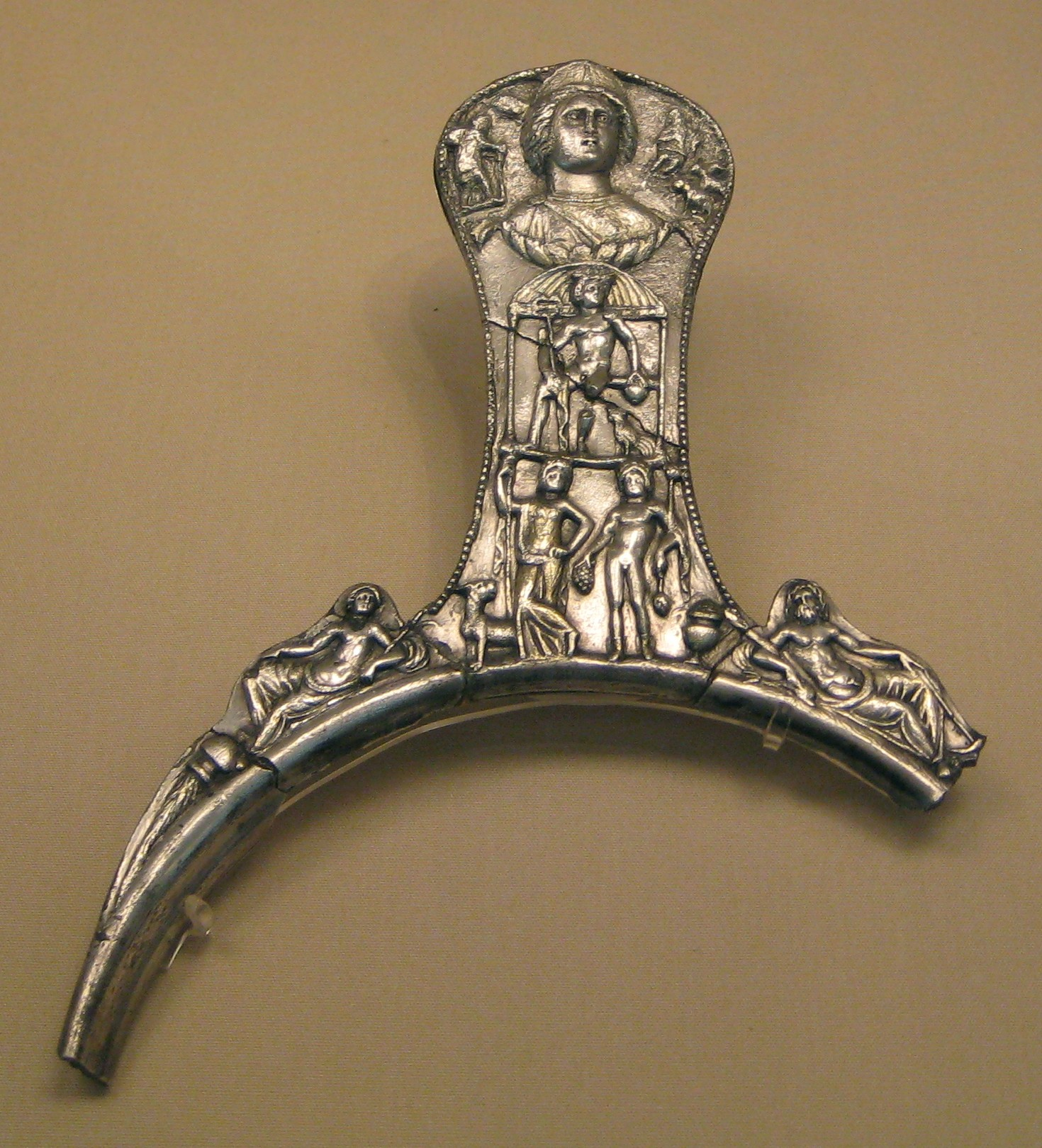
Handle from the Capheaton treasure in the British Museum

The Devil's Causeway passes the village just over 1 mile (2 km) to the east. The causeway is a Roman road which starts at Port Gate on Hadrian's Wall, north of Corbridge, and extends 55 miles (89 km) northwards across Northumberland to the mouth of the River Tweed at Berwick-upon-Tweed. A Roman-British silver treasure was found in the village in the eighteenth century. Known as the Capheaton Treasure, it is now in the British Museum.

Capheaton Hall is an English country house, the seat of the Swinburne Baronets and the childhood home of the poet Algernon Swinburne. It counts among the principal gentry seats of Northumberland. It is a Grade I listed building.

The house, which was built for Sir John Swinburne in 1667–68 by Robert Trollope of Newcastle, is a provincial essay in Baroque, of local stone with a giant pilasters on high bases supporting sections of entablature dividing the main front into a wide central bay and flanking bays, under a sloping roof with vernacular flat-footed dormers. The estate was improved with a model farm in Gothic taste, designed by Daniel Garrett for Sir John Swinburne, ca 1746, one of the earliest examples of the Gothic Revival. The north front was rebuilt for Sir John in 1789-90 by a local architect, William Newton.

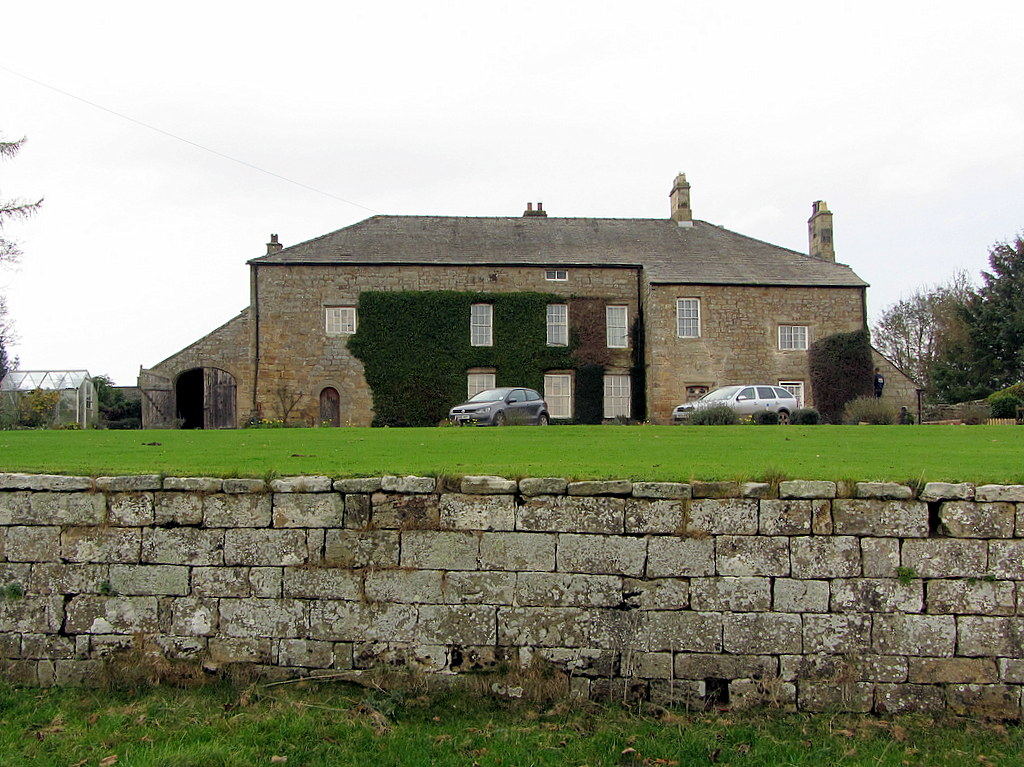
East Shaftoe Hall in 2014

The house stands in rolling parkland in the manner of Capability Brown. The naturalistic setting of Sir Edward's Lake south of the house was designated a Site of Nature Conservation Importance in 1983 for the wintering and breeding wildfowl it harbours.

Two miles north-east of the village is East Shaftoe Hall, a mostly 16th century house, much altered in the 17th and 18th centuries, which incorporates a peel tower dating from the late 13th or early 14th century.
