= Swinburne baronets =

Extinct baronetcy in the Baronetage of England

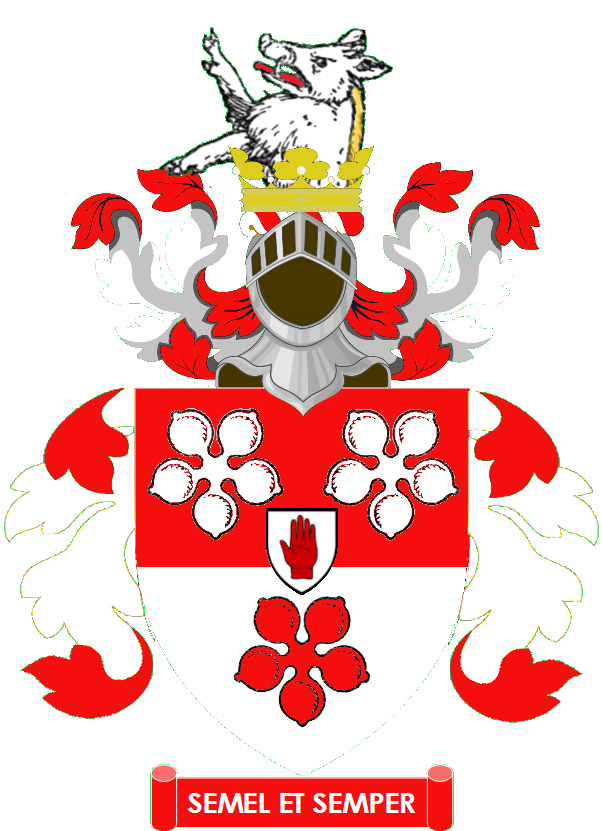
- Crest: Out of a ducal coronet Or a demi-boar rampant Argent crined of the First, langued Gules.
- Shield: Per fess Gules and Argent three cinquefoils counterchanged
- Motto: Semel et semper ('Once and always')

The Swinburne Baronetcy, of Capheaton in the county of Northumberland, was a title in the Baronetage of England. It was created on 26 September 1660 for John Swinburne in honour of the loyalty to Charles I of Swinburne's father and grandfather prior to and during the English Civil War. He demolished Capheaton Castle in 1668 and built a new house on the site. The sixth baronet was member of parliament for Launceston in 1788–9 and high sheriff of Northumberland in 1799. His grandson, the seventh baronet, was high sheriff in 1866 and member of parliament for Lichfield 1885–1892. His son, the eighth baronet was high sheriff in 1920. The title became extinct on the death of the tenth baronet in 1967.

The baronets were descended from the ancient Northumbrian family of Swinburne Castle which passed to the Heron family on the death of Sir Adam Swinburne. The junior line of Collerton came to Capheaton in 1264 and later in 1514 to Edlingham. Charles Henry Swinburne, younger son of the sixth baronet, was an admiral in the Royal Navy. His eldest son was the poet Algernon Charles Swinburne.

The family seat is at Capheaton Hall, Northumberland.

== Swinburne baronets, of Capheaton (1660) ==
- Sir John Swinburne, 1st Baronet (died 1706)
- Sir William Swinburne, 2nd Baronet (c. 1670–1716)
- Sir John Swinburne, 3rd Baronet (1698–1745)
- Sir John Swinburne, 4th Baronet (1724–1763)
- Sir Edward Swinburne, 5th Baronet (1733–1786)
- Sir John Edward Swinburne, 6th Baronet (1762–1860)
- Sir John Swinburne, 7th Baronet (1831–1914)
- Sir Hubert Swinburne, 8th Baronet (1867–1934)
- Sir James Swinburne, 9th Baronet (1858–1958)
- Sir Spearman Charles Swinburne, 10th Baronet (1893–1967)
