= Capheaton Treasure =

Roman hoard

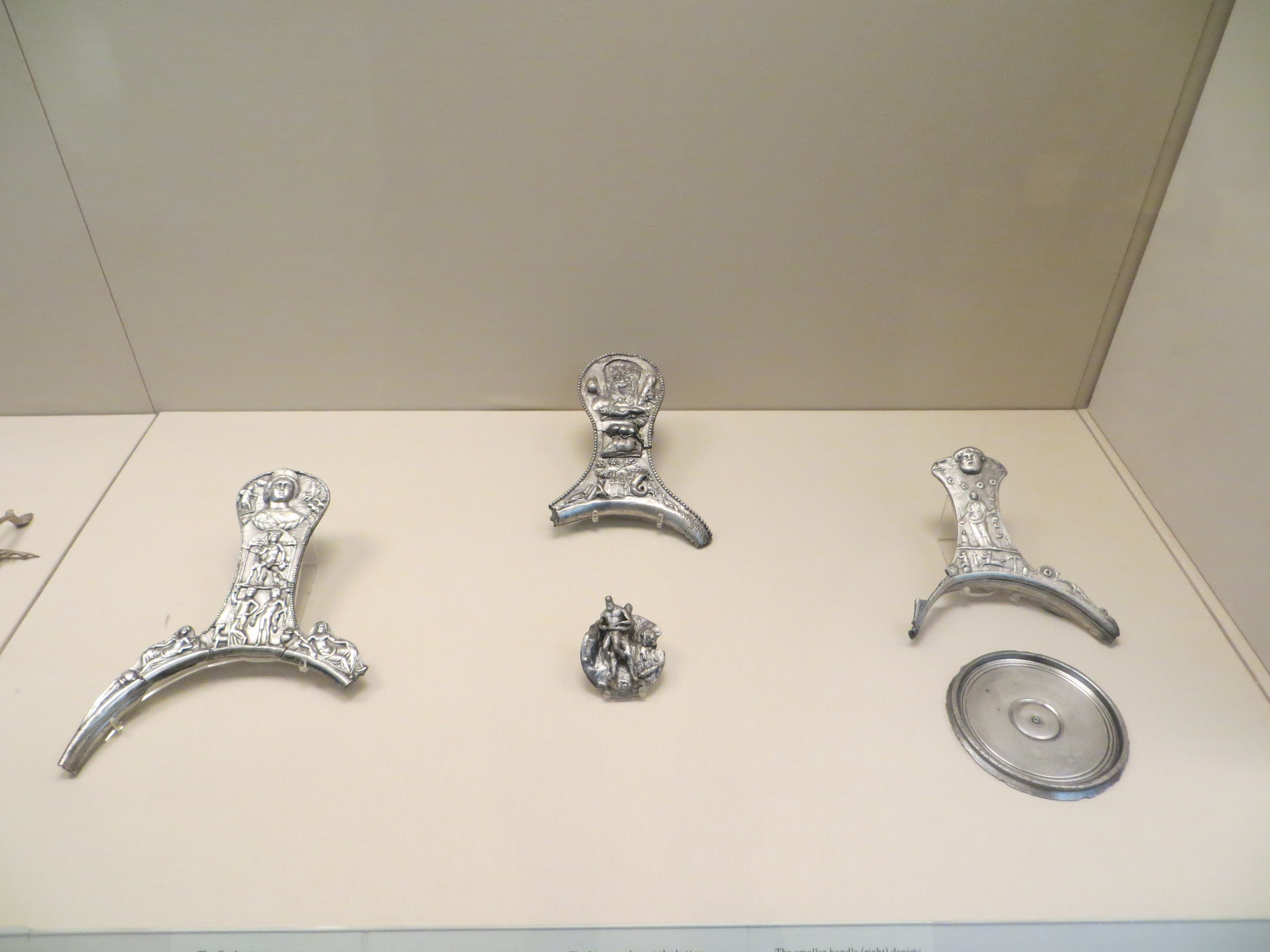
- The Capheaton Treasure, as displayed in the British Museum
- Material: Silver
- Created: 2nd-3rd Century AD
- Present location: British Museum, London
- Registration: P&EE 1824.4-89.59-65

The Capheaton Treasure is an important Roman silver hoard found in the village of Capheaton in Northumberland, north-east England. Since 1824, it has been part of the British Museum's collection.

== Discovery ==
The hoard was discovered in 1747 in the village of Capheaton near Kirkwhelpington in Northumberland. Some of the treasure was melted down soon after it was found. That which survived was bequeathed by the antiquary and philanthropist Richard Payne Knight to the British Museum in 1824.

== Description ==
The six objects that compose the treasure date from the 2nd/3rd centuries AD and depict a range of religious and mythological subjects. They are unfortunately only fragments of highly decorated silver vessels they may have formed part of a temple treasure. Four of them are the handles of silver vessels, probably skillets, while the other two are the base and a fitting for a silver vessel. The subjects represented on the handles include the goddess Minerva above a temple, the deity Juno, below which is a seated figure of Mercury with the flanking figures of Bacchus and Ariadne below and six of the Twelve Labours of Hercules.

== See also ==
- Chatuzange Treasure for a similar but more intact temple treasure from the same period

== Gallery ==
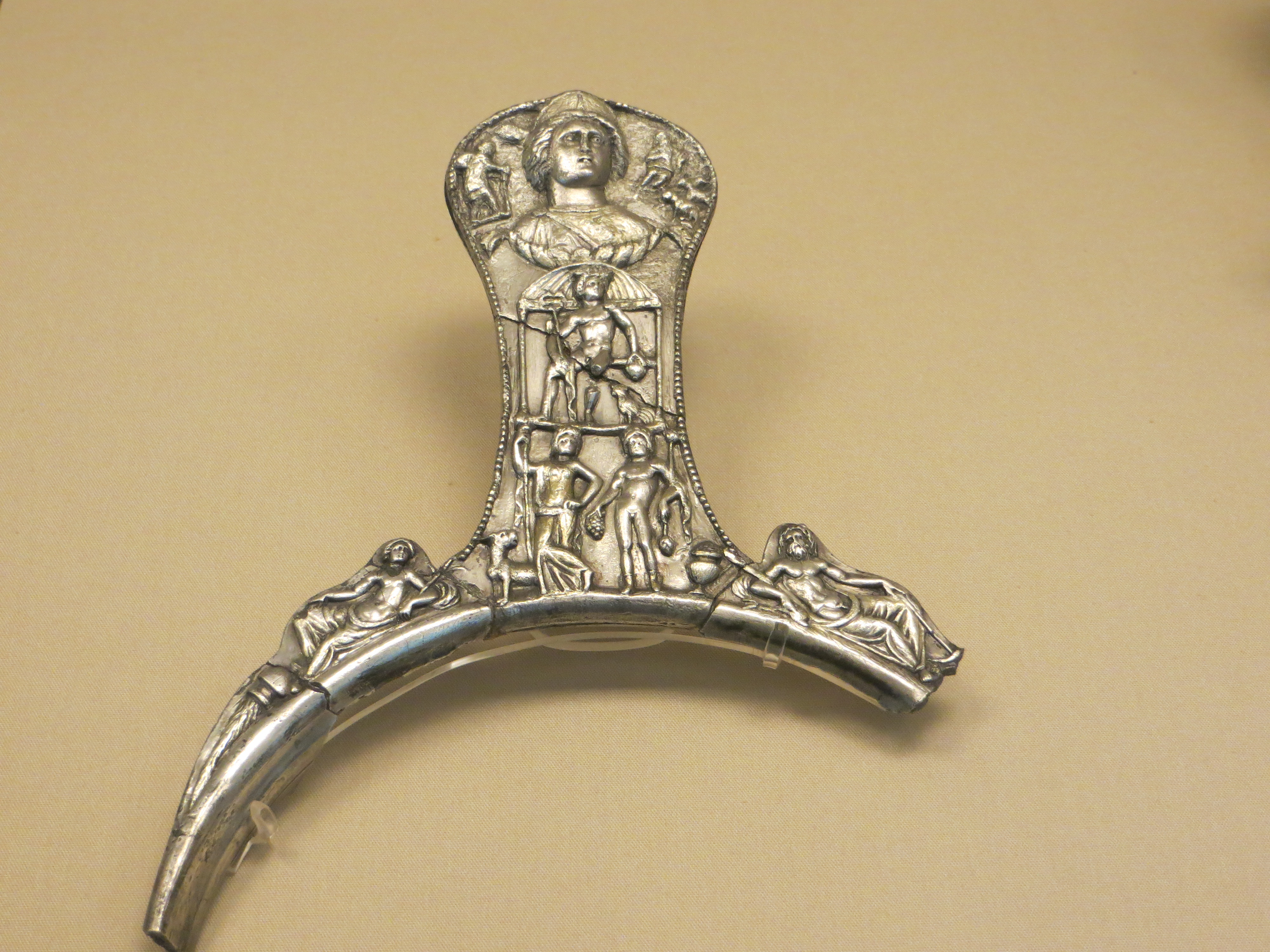
Silver handle with depiction of the goddess Minerva above a temple

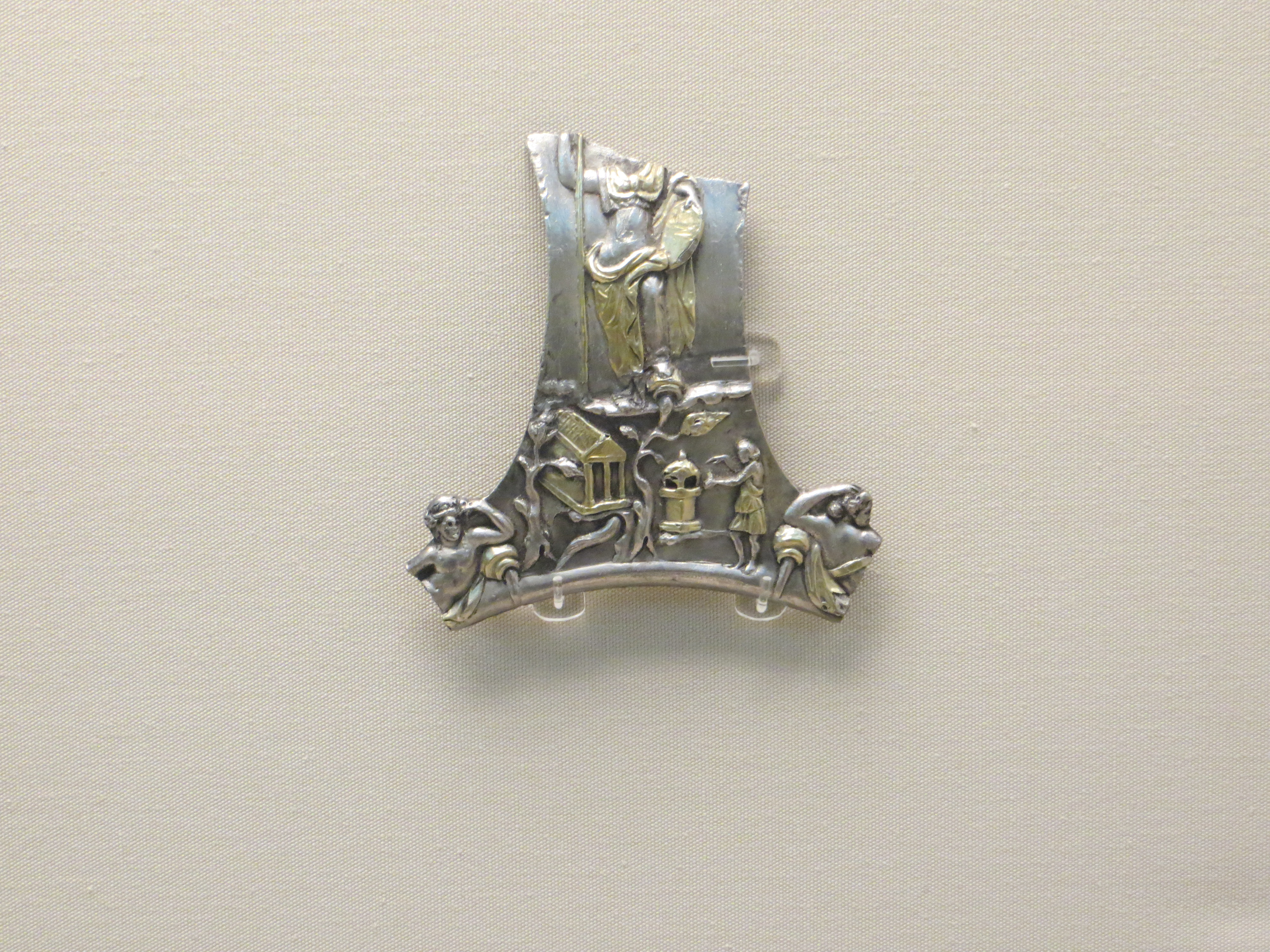
Bust of Juno with various Roman/Greek gods below

== Bibliography ==
- D. Strong, Greek and Roman Silver Plate (British Museum Press, 1966)
- L. Burn, The British Museum Book of Greek and Roman Art (British Museum Press, 1991)
- S. Walker, Roman Art (British Museum Press, 1991)
