= Capheaton Hall =

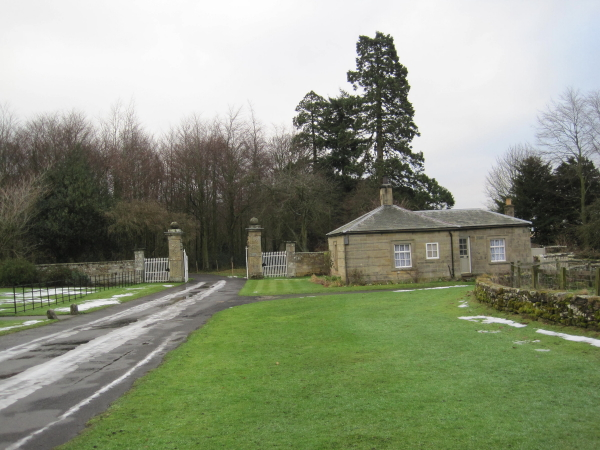
- West Lodge to Capheaton Hall

- Location in Northumberland

General information
- Location: Northumberland, England
- Coordinates: 55.119°N 1.941°W
- OS grid: NZ038804

Capheaton Hall, near Wallington, Northumberland, is an English country house, the seat of the Swinburne Baronets and a childhood home of the poet Algernon Swinburne. It counts among the principal gentry seats of Northumberland. It is a Grade I listed building.

The house, which was built for Sir John Swinburne, 1st Baronet in 1667-68 by Robert Trollope of Newcastle, is a provincial essay in Baroque, of local stone with giant pilasters on high bases supporting sections of entablature dividing the main front into a wide central bay and flanking bays, under a sloping roof with vernacular flat-footed dormers. The estate was improved with a model farm in Gothic taste, designed by Daniel Garrett for Sir John Swinburne, ca 1746, one of the earliest examples of the Gothic Revival. The north front was rebuilt for Sir John Swinburne, 6th Baronet in 1789-90 by a local architect, William Newton.

The house stands in rolling parkland in the manner of Capability Brown. The naturalistic setting of Sir Edward's Lake south of the house was designated a Site of Nature Conservation Importance in 1983 for the wintering and breeding wildfowl it harbours, as well as the fen and carr vegetation that has developed round its margins.

The linear estate village of Capheaton (population 50), built as a planned model village in the late eighteenth century, is sited on a ridge west of the Hall.

The Capheaton archives are at the Northumberland Record Office.
