= Songs before Sunrise =

Songs before Sunrise is a collection of poems relating to Italy, and particularly its unification, by Algernon Charles Swinburne. It was published in 1871 and can be seen as an extension of his earlier long poem, "A Song of Italy". Swinburne dedicated the volume to his hero, Italian patriot Giuseppe Mazzini, whom he had met in March 1867.
