= Algernon Charles Swinburne =

English poet, playwright and novelist (1837–1909)

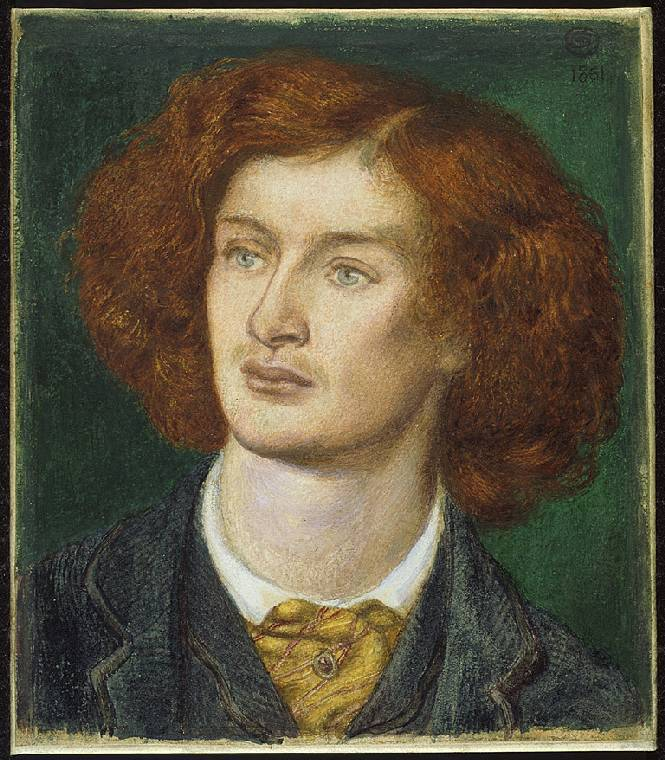
- Portrait in watercolour and chalk by Dante Gabriel Rossetti, 1861
- Born: 5 April 1837; London, England
- Died: 10 April 1909 (aged 72); London, England
- Education: Eton College
- Alma mater: Balliol College, Oxford
- Occupations: Poet, playwright, novelist, and critic
- Writing career
- Period: Victorian era
- Notable work: Poems and Ballads
- Literary movement: Pre-Raphaelite Brotherhood

Signature
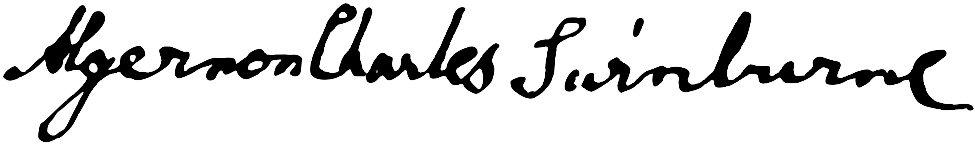

Algernon Charles Swinburne (5 April 1837 – 10 April 1909) was an English poet, playwright, novelist, and critic. He was a major contributor to the Pre-Raphaelite movement in poetry, along with Dante Gabriel Rossetti and William Morris. His greatest works are the verse drama Atalanta in Calydon (1865), written in the form of an Ancient Greek tragedy, and his Pre-Raphaelite Poems and Ballads (1866).

In his poetry, Swinburne rebelled against the Christian morality of the Victorian era, drawing from classical, medieval, and Renaissance sources to explore atheism in "Hymn to Proserpine", suicide in "The Triumph of Time", lesbian desire in "Anactoria", and sado-masochism in "Dolores". While Swinburne's work attracted scandal, it had prominent Victorian defenders, including John Ruskin.

Swinburne's poetic style is rhythmic, alliterative, and sensual, and drew both critical acclaim and moral condemnation in his lifetime. His poems are often complex, working double rhymes and anapaestic metre into intricate stanzas. Swinburne's style was shaped by that of the French poet Charles Baudelaire, author of the notorious Les Fleurs du mal, for whom Swinburne wrote the poetic eulogy "Ave Atque Vale".

Swinburne was nominated for the Nobel Prize in Literature every year from 1903 to 1909. After the death of Alfred, Lord Tennyson in 1892, Swinburne was considered for the post of Poet Laureate of the United Kingdom, but was disqualified by Queen Victoria on moral grounds. His writings influenced Aesthetic and Decadent poets of the fin de siècle, such as Oscar Wilde and Ernest Dowson.

== Biography ==
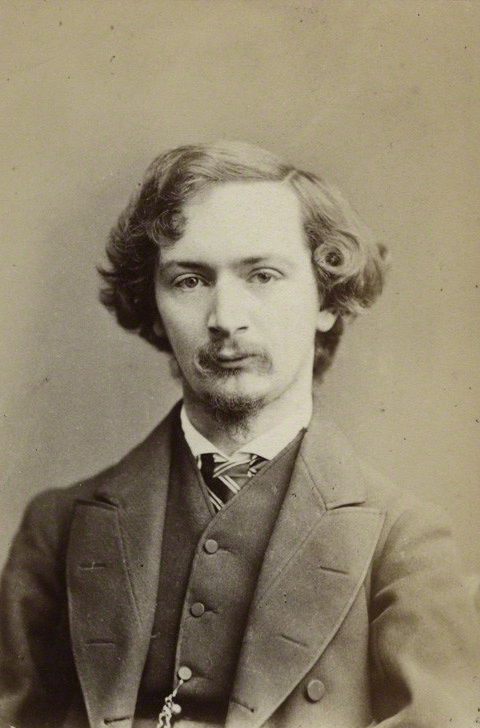
Swinburne in 1865

Swinburne was born at 7 Chester Street, Grosvenor Place, London, on 5 April 1837. He was the eldest of six children born to Captain (later Admiral) Charles Henry Swinburne (1797–1877) and Lady Jane Henrietta, daughter of the 3rd Earl of Ashburnham, a wealthy Northumbrian family. He grew up at East Dene in Bonchurch on the Isle of Wight. The Swinburnes also had a London home at Whitehall Gardens, Westminster. As a child, Swinburne was "nervous" and "frail", but "was also fired with nervous energy and fearlessness to the point of being reckless". He rode horses and wrote plays with his first cousin Mary Gordon who lived nearby on the Isle of Wight. They secretly collaborated on her second book, Children of the Chapel, which contained an unusual number of beatings.

Swinburne attended Eton College (1849–53), where he began to write poetry. At Eton, he won first prizes in French and Italian. He attended Balliol College, Oxford (1856–60), with a brief hiatus when he was rusticated from the university in 1859 for publicly supporting the attempted assassination of Napoleon III by Felice Orsini. He returned in May 1860, but never received a degree. At Oxford, Swinburne met several Pre-Raphaelites, including Dante Gabriel Rossetti. He also met William Morris. After leaving college, he lived in London and started an active writing career, where Rossetti was delighted with his "little Northumbrian friend", probably a reference to Swinburne's diminutive height—he was just 5 ft 4 in (163 cm).

Swinburne spent summer holidays at Capheaton Hall in Northumberland, the house of his grandfather, Sir John Swinburne, 6th Baronet (1762–1860), who had a famous library and was president of the Literary and Philosophical Society in Newcastle upon Tyne. Swinburne considered Northumberland to be his native county, an emotion reflected in poems like the intensely patriotic "Northumberland", "Grace Darling" and others. He enjoyed riding his pony across the moors; he was a daring horseman, "through honeyed leagues of the northland border", as he called the Scottish border in his Recollections. In the period 1857–60, Swinburne became a member of Lady Trevelyan's intellectual circle at Wallington Hall.

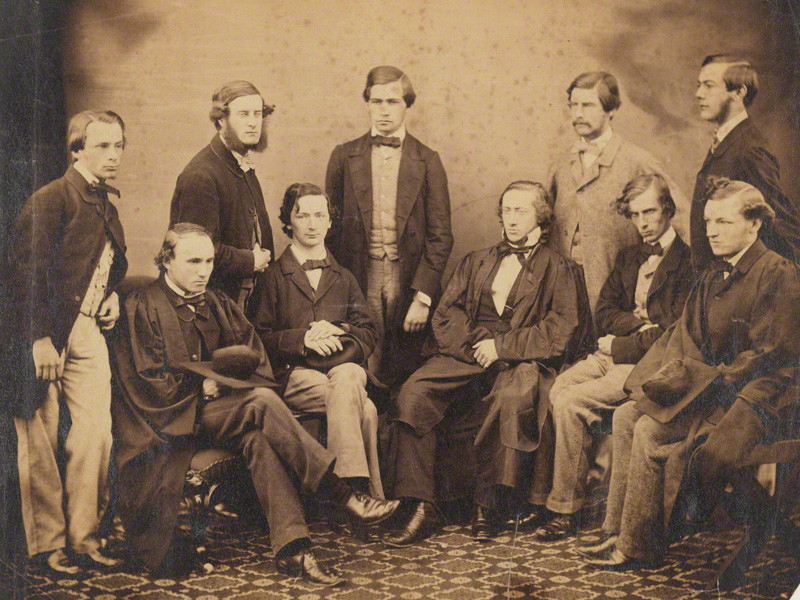
NPG P416. Swinburne with nine of his peers at Oxford, c. 1850s (Left to right: 1. Joseph Frank Payne, standing; 2. George Rankine Luke, sitting; 3. John Warneford Hoole, standing; 4. Swinburne, sitting; 5. Thomas Hill Green, standing; 6. John Nichol, sitting; 7. James Bryce, 1st Viscount Bryce, standing; 8. Albert Venn Dicey, sitting; 9. Aeneas James George Mackay, standing; 10. Thomas Erskine Holland, sitting)

After his grandfather's death in 1860, Swinburne stayed with William Bell Scott in Newcastle. In 1861, Swinburne visited Menton on the French Riviera, staying at the Villa Laurenti to recover from the excessive use of alcohol. From Menton, Swinburne went to Italy, where he travelled extensively. In December 1862, Swinburne accompanied Scott and his guests, probably including Dante Gabriel Rossetti, on a trip to Tynemouth. Scott writes in his memoirs that, as they walked by the sea, Swinburne declaimed the as yet unpublished "Hymn to Proserpine" and "Laus Veneris" in his lilting intonation, while the waves "were running the whole length of the long level sands towards Cullercoats and sounding like far-off acclamations".

Despite the call of the sea, in October of 1868, Algernon Swinburne's life was spared by another young poet, Guy de Maupassant. At age 18, Maupassant saved him from drowning off the coast of Étretat.

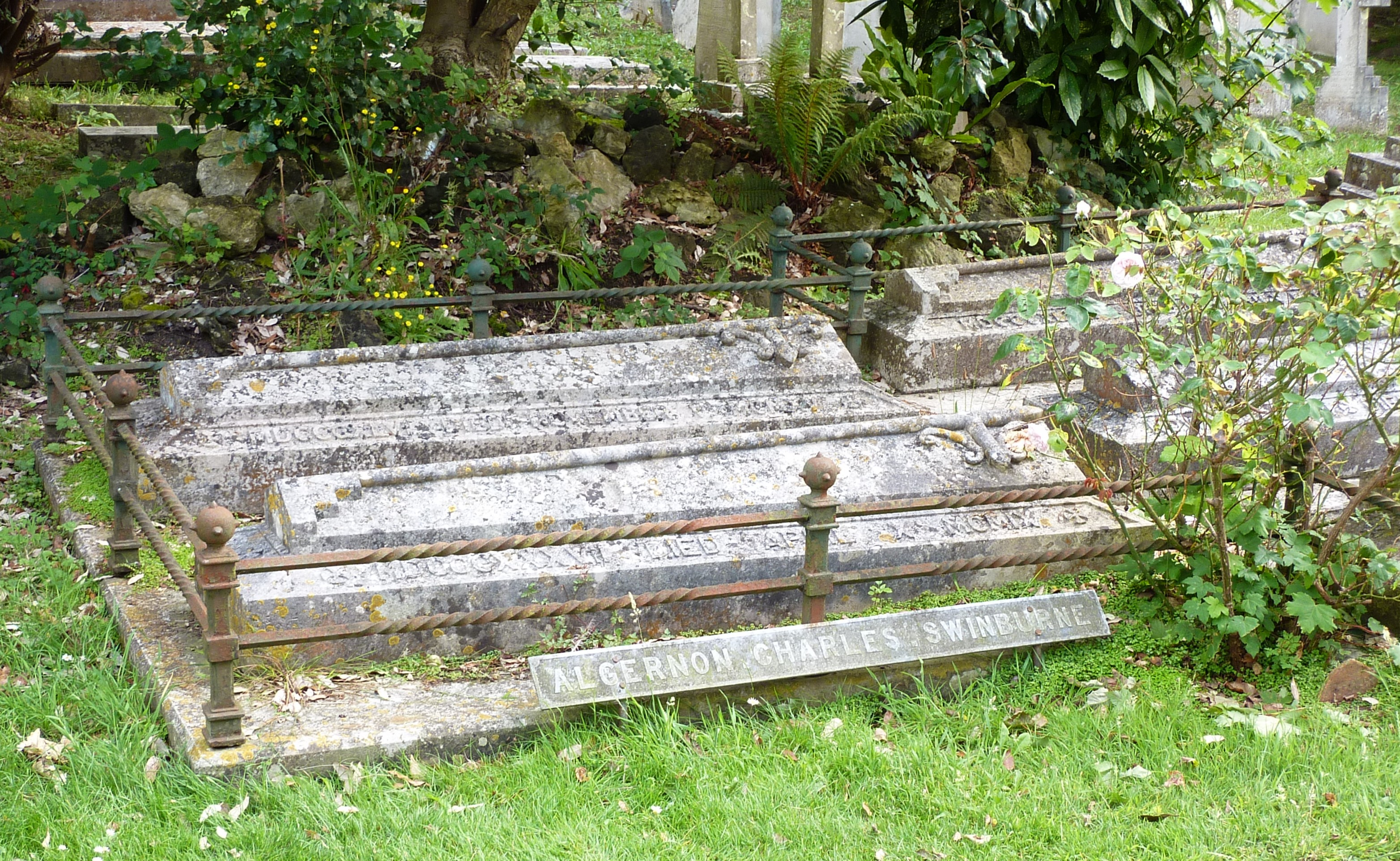
Swinburne's grave at St Boniface Church, Bonchurch, Isle of Wight, pictured in 2013

Swinburne was an alcoholic and algolagniac and highly excitable. He liked to be flogged. His health suffered, and in 1879 at the age of 42, he was taken into care by his friend, Theodore Watts-Dunton, who looked after him for the rest of his life at The Pines, 11 Putney Hill, Putney. Watts-Dunton took him to the lost town of Dunwich, on the Suffolk coast, on several occasions in the 1870s. In Watts-Dunton's care Swinburne lost his youthful rebelliousness and developed into a figure of social respectability. It was said of Watts-Dunton that he saved the man and killed the poet. Swinburne died at the Pines on 10 April 1909, at the age of 72, and was buried at St Boniface Church, Bonchurch on the Isle of Wight.

== Career ==
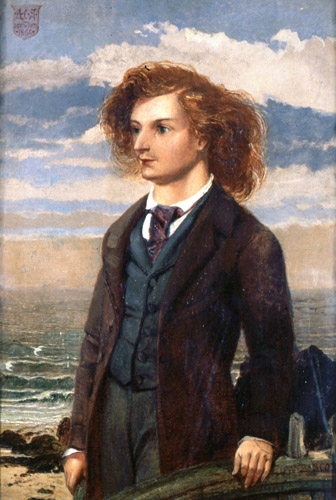
Portrait of Swinburne by William Bell Scott c. 1850–70

Swinburne's poetic works include Atalanta in Calydon (1865); Poems and Ballads (1866); Songs before Sunrise (1871); Poems and Ballads Second Series (1878); Tristram of Lyonesse (1882); Poems and Ballads Third Series (1889); and the novel Lesbia Brandon (published posthumously in 1952). He was influenced by the work of William Shakespeare, Percy Bysshe Shelley, Catullus, William Morris, Dante Gabriel Rossetti, Robert Browning, Alfred Lord Tennyson, and Victor Hugo. Swinburne was popular in England during his lifetime but his stature has greatly decreased since his death.

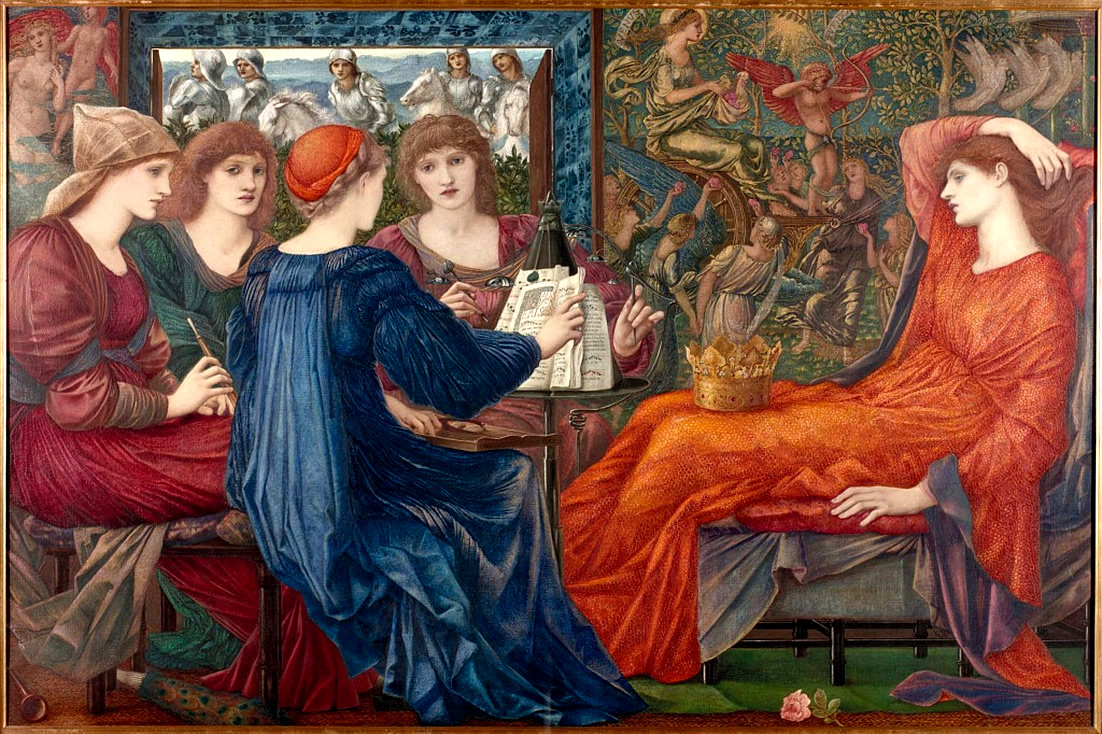
Laus Veneris (c. 1874) by Edward Burne-Jones, based on Swinburne's poem of the same name

Poems and Ballads caused a sensation when it was first published, especially the poems written in homage to Sappho of Lesbos such as "Anactoria" and "Sapphics": Moxon and Co. transferred its publication rights to John Camden Hotten. Other poems in this volume such as "The Leper", "Laus Veneris", and "St Dorothy" evoke a Victorian fascination with the Middle Ages, and are explicitly mediaeval in style, tone and construction. Also featured in this volume are "Hymn to Proserpine", "The Triumph of Time" and "Dolores (Notre-Dame des Sept Douleurs)". Swinburne wrote in a wide variety of forms, including Sapphic stanzas (comprising 3 hendecasyllabic lines followed by an Adonic):

So the goddess fled from her place, with awful
Sound of feet and thunder of wings around her;
While behind a clamour of singing women
Severed the twilight.

— "Sapphics", stanza 6

Swinburne devised the poetic form called the roundel, a variation of the French Rondeau, and examples of this form were included in A Century of Roundels dedicated to Christina Rossetti. Swinburne wrote to Edward Burne-Jones in 1883: "I have got a tiny new book of songs or songlets, in one form and all manner of metres ... just coming out, of which Miss Rossetti has accepted the dedication. I hope you and Georgie [his wife Georgiana, one of the MacDonald sisters] will find something to like among a hundred poems of nine lines each, twenty-four of which are about babies or small children". Opinions about these poems vary, some finding them captivating and brilliant while others see them as over-clever and contrived. One of these poems, A Baby's Death, was set to music by the English composer Sir Edward Elgar as the song "Roundel: The little eyes that never knew Light". English composer Mary Augusta Wakefield set Swinburne's May Time in Midwinter to music.

After the first Poems and Ballads, Swinburne's later poetry became increasingly devoted to celebrations of republicanism and revolutionary causes, particularly in the volume Songs before Sunrise. "A Song of Italy" is dedicated to Giuseppe Mazzini; "Ode on the Proclamation of the French Republic" is dedicated to Victor Hugo; and "Dirae" is a sonnet sequence of vituperative attacks against those whom Swinburne believed to be enemies of liberty. Erechtheus is the culmination of Swinburne's republican verse. He did not stop writing love poetry entirely; indeed his epic-length poem Tristram of Lyonesse was produced during this period but its content is much less shocking than that of his earlier love poetry. His versification, and especially his rhyming technique, remained in top form to the end.

== Reception ==
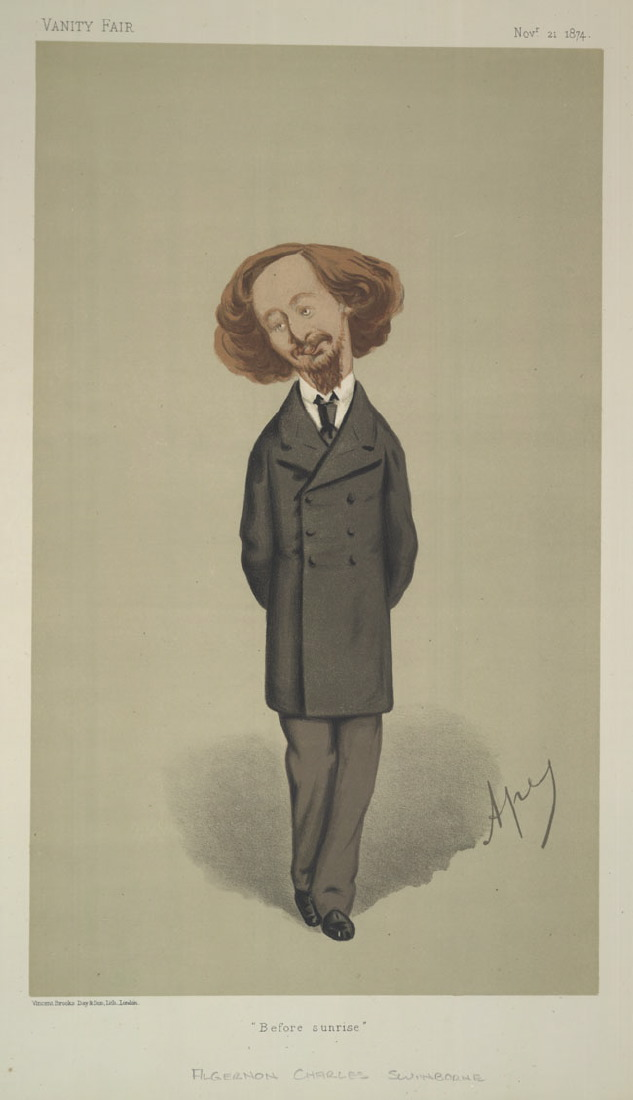
Swinburne caricatured by Carlo Pellegrini in Vanity Fair, 1874

Renée Vivien, the English poet, was highly impressed with Swinburne and often included quotations from him in her works. In France, Swinburne was highly praised by the Symbolist poet Stéphane Mallarmé, and was invited to contribute to a book in honour of the poet Théophile Gautier, Le tombeau de Théophile Gautier (Wikisource): he answered by writing down six poems in French, English, Latin, and Greek. In the United States, horror fiction writer H. P. Lovecraft considered Swinburne "the only real poet in either England or America after the death of Mr. Edgar Allan Poe". Swinburne is considered a poet of the Decadent school. Rumours about his perversions often filled the broadsheets, and he ironically used to play along, confessing to being a pederast and having sex with monkeys.

T. S. Eliot read Swinburne's essays on the Shakespearean and Jonsonian dramatists in The Contemporaries of Shakespeare and The Age of Shakespeare and Swinburne's books on Shakespeare and Jonson. Writing on Swinburne in The Sacred Wood: Essays on Poetry and Criticism, Eliot wrote Swinburne had mastered his material, and "he is a more reliable guide to [these dramatists] than Hazlitt, Coleridge, or Lamb: and his perception of relative values is almost always correct". Eliot wrote that Swinburne, as a poet, "mastered his technique, which is a great deal, but he did not master it to the extent of being able to take liberties with it, which is everything". Furthermore, Eliot disliked Swinburne's prose, about which he wrote "the tumultuous outcry of adjectives, the headstrong rush of undisciplined sentences, are the index to the impatience and perhaps laziness of a disorderly mind".

Swinburne was nominated for the Nobel Prize in Literature every year from 1903 to 1909. In 1908 he was one of the main candidates considered for the prize, and was nominated again in 1909. Selections from his poems were translated into French by Gabriel Mourey: Poèmes et ballades d'Algernon Charles Swinburne (Paris, Albert Savine, 1891), incorporating notes by Guy de Maupassant; and Chants d'avant l'aube de Swinburne (Paris, P.-V. Stock, 1909). Italian Decadent writer Gabriele D'Annunzio repeatedly emulated Swinburne in his own poetry, and it is believed that his acquaintance with Swinburne was primarily through Mourey's French translations.

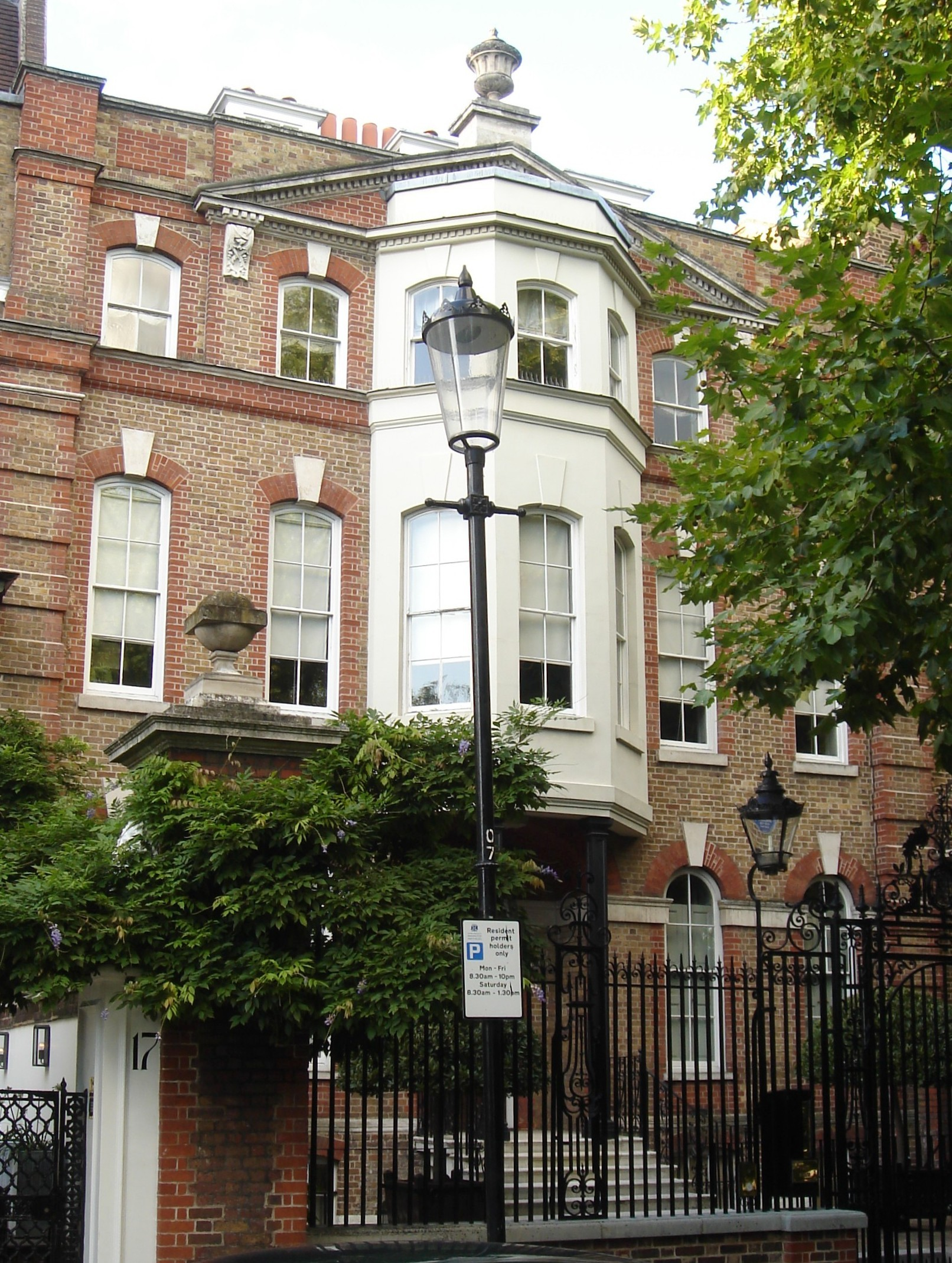
16 Cheyne Walk, home to Swinburne

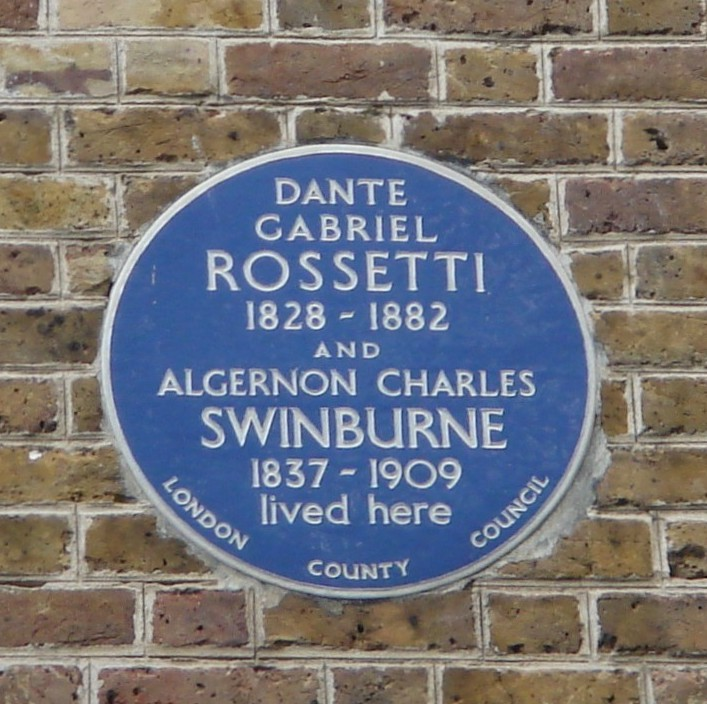
Blue plaque at 16 Cheyne Walk

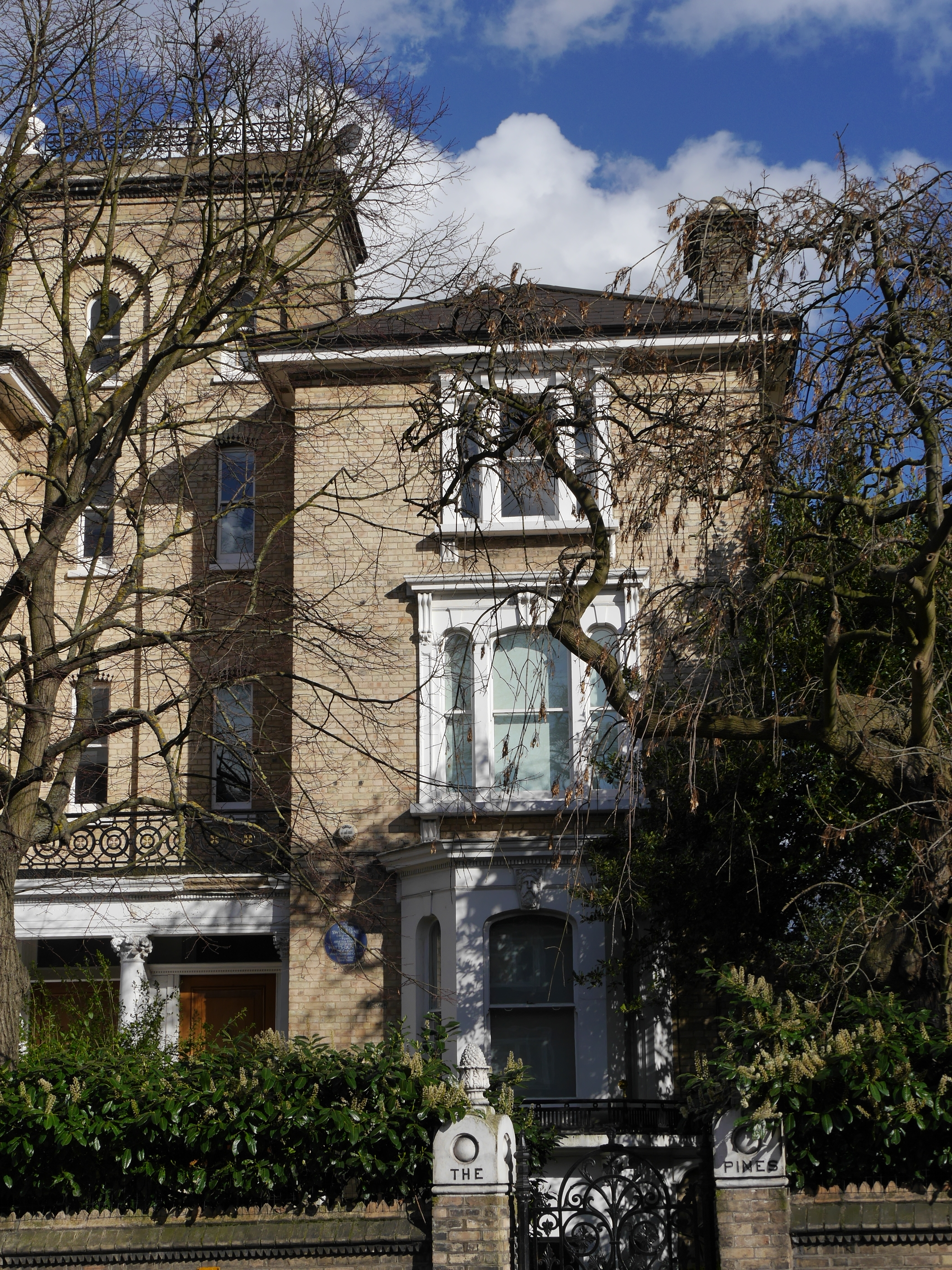
The Pines, Putney

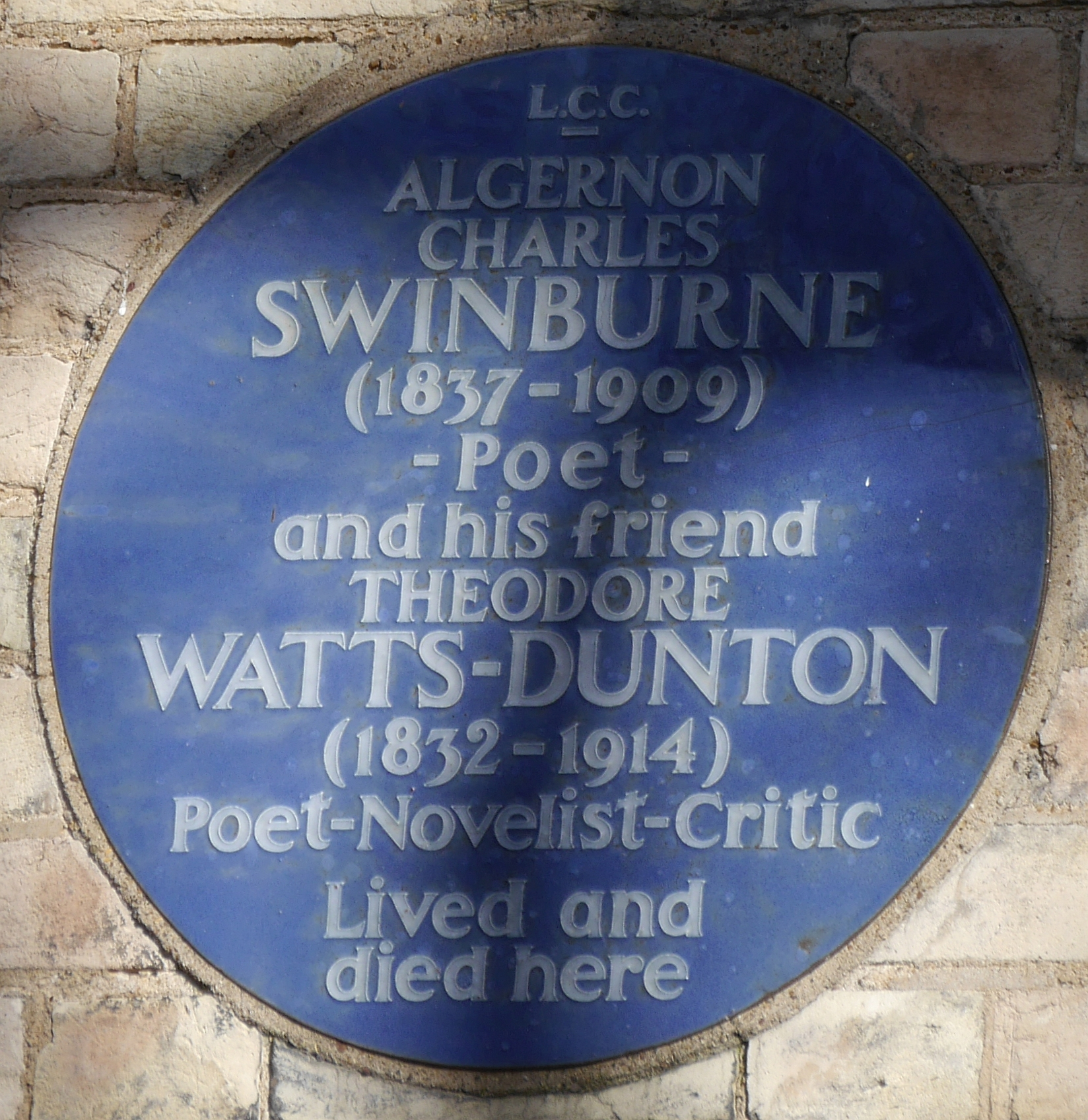
Blue plaque at The Pines, Putney

== Works ==
=== Verse drama ===
- The Queen-mother (1860)
- Rosamond (1860)
- Chastelard (1865)
- Bothwell (1874)
- Mary Stuart (1881)
- Marino Faliero (1885)
- Locrine (1887)
- The Sisters (1892)
- Rosamund, Queen of the Lombards (1899)

=== Prose drama ===
- La Soeur de la reine (published posthumously 1964)

=== Poetry ===
- Atalanta in Calydon (1865)^{†}
- Poems and Ballads (1866)
- Cleopatra (1866)
- Songs Before Sunrise (1871)
- Songs of Two Nations' (1875)
- Erechtheus (1876)^{†}
- Poems and Ballads, Second Series (1878)
- Songs of the Springtides (1880)
- Studies in Song (1880)
- The Heptalogia, or the Seven against Sense. A Cap with Seven Bells (1880)
- Tristram of Lyonesse (1882)
- A Century of Roundels (1883)
- A Midsummer Holiday and Other Poems (1884)
- Poems and Ballads, Third Series (1889)
- Astrophel and Other Poems (1894)
- The Tale of Balen (1896)
- A Channel Passage and Other Poems (1904)

^†Although formally tragedies, Atalanta in Calydon and Erechtheus are traditionally included with "poetry".

=== Criticism ===
- William Blake: A Critical Essay (1868, new edition 1906)
- Under the Microscope (1872)
- George Chapman: A Critical Essay (1875)
- Essays and Studies (1875)
- A Note on Charlotte Brontë (1877)
- A Study of Shakespeare (1880)
- A Study of Victor Hugo (1886)
- A Study of Ben Johnson (1889)
- Studies in Prose and Poetry (1894)
- The Age of Shakespeare (1908)
- Shakespeare (1909)

=== Major collections ===
- Atalanta in Calydon: and lyrical poems, 1901.
- The poems of Algernon Charles Swinburne, 6 vols. London: Chatto & Windus, 1904.
- The Tragedies of Algernon Charles Swinburne, 5 vols. London: Chatto & Windus, 1905.
- The Complete Works of Algernon Charles Swinburne, ed. Sir Edmund Gosse and Thomas James Wise, 20 vols. Bonchurch Edition; London and New York: William Heinemann and Gabriel Wells, 1925–7.
- The Swinburne Letters, ed. Cecil Y. Lang, 6 vols. 1959–62.
- Uncollected Letters of Algernon Charles Swinburne, ed. Terry L. Meyers, 3 vols. 2004.
- On-line Supplement to Uncollected Letters at The Swinburne Project <https://swinburne.luddy.indiana.edu/acs0000505-01.html>

== Ancestry ==
Ancestors of Algernon Charles Swinburne

Sir John Swinburne, 3rd Baronet
Sir Edward Swinburne, 5th Baronet
Mary Bedingfield
Sir John Edward Swinburne, 6th Baronet
Robert Dillon, Lord of Terrafort
Catherine/Christiana Dillon
Martha Newland
Admiral Charles Henry Swinburne
Bennett Alexander Bennett
Richard Henry Alexander Bennet of Beckenham
Mary Ash
Emilia Elizabeth Bennet
Peter Burrell of Langley Park
Elizabeth Amelia Burrell
Elizabeth Lewis
Algernon Charles Swinburne
Colonel John Ashburnham, 1st Earl of Ashburnham
John Ashburnham, 2nd Earl of Ashburnham
Jemima Grey, Countess of Ashburnham
George Ashburnham, 3rd Earl of Ashburnham
John Crowley/Crawley
Elizabeth Crowley/Crawley, Countess of Ashburnham
Theodosia Gascoygne/Gascoigne
Lady Jane Henrietta Ashburnham
Sir Hugh Percy, 1st Duke of Northumberland
Algernon Percy, 1st Earl of Beverley
Elizabeth Seymour, Duchess of Northumberland
Lady Charlotte Percy, Countess of Ashburnham
Peter Burrell of Langley Park
Isabella Burrell, Countess of Beverley
Elizabeth Lewis

== See also ==
- Flowers for Algernon also called Charly. Daniel Keyes paid homage to Algernon Charles Swinburne
- Patience, or Bunthorne's Bride (1881), a Gilbert-and-Sullivan opera that satirizes Swinburne and his poetry

== Sources ==
- Anonymous (1873). Cartoon portraits and biographical sketches of men of the day. Illustrated by Frederick Waddy. London: Tinsley Brothers. pp. 48–49.
- Fuller, Jean Overton. Swinburne: A Critical Biography. Chatto & Windus.
- Hare, Humphrey (1949). Swinburne: A Biographical Approach. H. F. & G. Witherby.
- Henderson, Philip (1974). Swinburne: The Portrait of a Poet. Routledge & Kegan Paul.
- Hyder, Clyde K. (editor, 1970). Swinburne. The Critical Heritage. Routledge & Kegan Paul.
- Leith, Mrs. Disney. (1917). Algernon Charles Swinburne, Personal Recollections by his Cousin - With excerpts from some of his personal letters. London and New York : G. P. Putnam's Sons.
- Louis, Margot Kathleen (1990). Swinburne and His Gods: the Roots and Growth of an Agnostic Poetry. Mcgill-Queens University Press.
- McGann, Jerome (1972). Swinburne: An Experiment in Criticism. University of Chicago Press.
- Panter-Downes, Mollie (1971). At the Pines: Swinburne and Watts-Dunton in Putney. Hamish Hamilton.
- Peters, Robert (1965). The Crowns of Apollo: Swinburne's Principles of Literature and Art: a Study in Victorian Criticism and Aesthetics. Wayne State University Press.
- Rooksby, Rikky (1997). A C Swinburne: A Poet's Life. Aldershot: Scolar Press.
- Thomas, Donald (1979). Swinburne: The Poet in his World. Weidenfeld & Nicolson.
- Swinburne, Algernon (1919). Gosse, Edmund; Wise, Thomas, eds., The Letters of Algernon Charles Swinburne, Volumes 1–6, New York: John Lane Company.
- Swinburne, Algernon Charles (1889). Poems and Ballads: First Series. Chatto and Windus.
- Wakeling, E; Hubbard, T; Rooksby, R (2008). Lewis Carroll, Robert Louis Stevenson and Algernon Charles Swinburne by their contemporaries. London: Pickering & Chatto, 3 vols.
- Welby, T. Earle (1969). A Study of Swinburne. Methuen & Co.
- Gosse, Edmund William (1911). "Swinburne, Algernon Charles" . In Chisholm, Hugh (ed.). Encyclopædia Britannica. Vol. 26 (11th ed.). Cambridge University Press. pp. 234–235.
- Gosse, Edmund William (1912). "Swinburne, Algernon Charles" . In Lee, Sidney (ed.). Dictionary of National Biography (2nd supplement). London: Smith, Elder & Co.
- Rooksby, Rikky. "Swinburne, Algernon Charles (1837–1909)". Oxford Dictionary of National Biography (online ed.). Oxford University Press. doi:10.1093/ref:odnb/36389. (Subscription, Wikipedia Library access or UK public library membership required.)
