= Byzantine dress =

Clothing and fashion trends of the Byzantine Empire

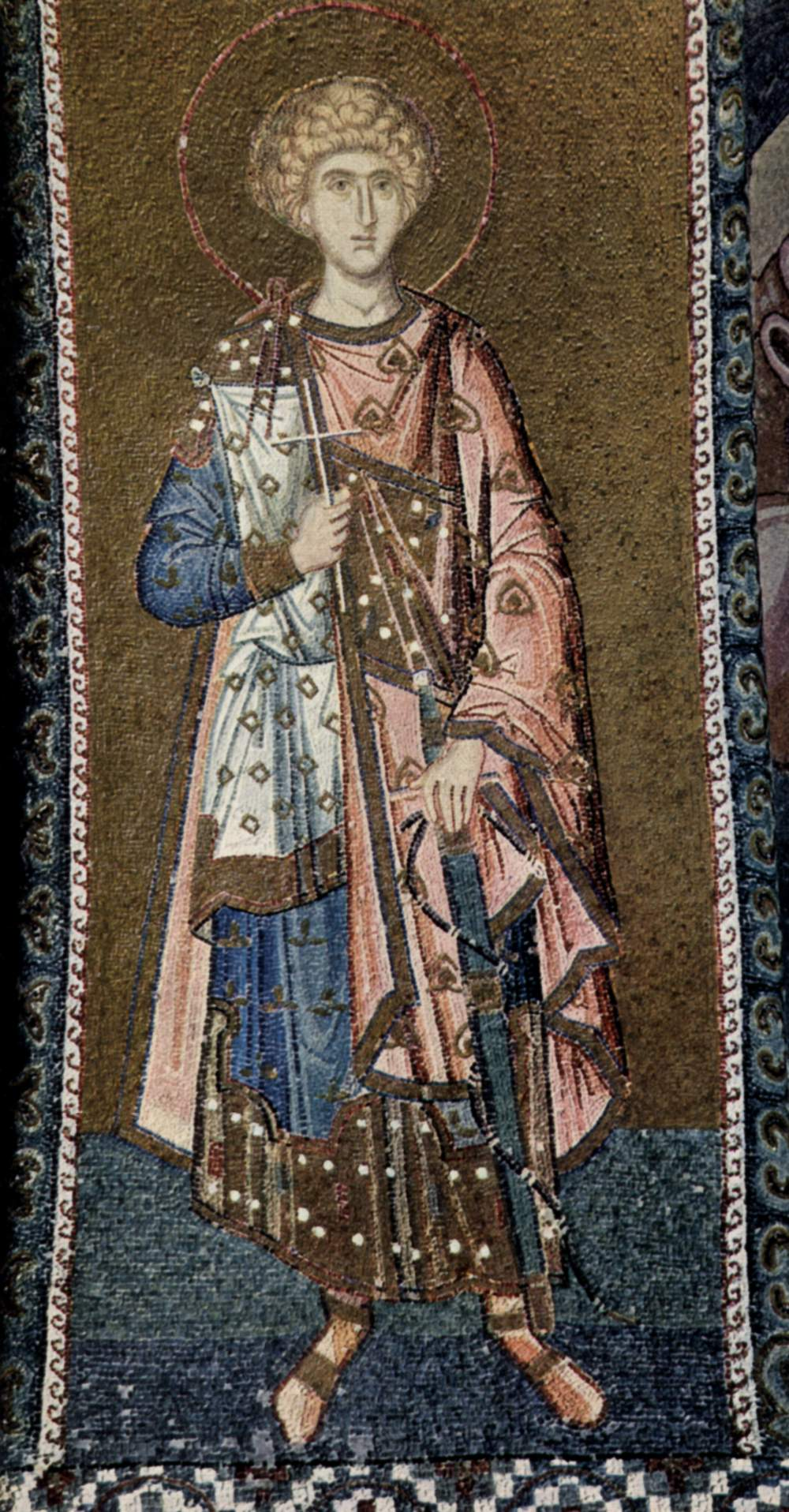
A 14th-century military martyr wears four layers, all patterned and richly trimmed: a cloak with tablion over a short dalmatic, another layer (?), and a tunic

Byzantine dress changed considerably over the thousand years of the Empire, but was essentially conservative. The Byzantines liked colour and pattern, and made and exported very richly patterned cloth, especially Byzantine silk, woven and embroidered for the upper classes, and resist-dyed and printed for the lower. A different border or trimming round the edges was very common, and many single stripes down the body or around the upper arm are seen, often denoting class or rank. Taste for the middle and upper classes followed the latest fashions at the Imperial Court.

As in the West during the Middle Ages, clothing was very expensive for the poor, who probably wore the same well-worn clothes nearly all the time; this meant in particular that any costume owned by most women needed to fit throughout the full length of a pregnancy. Even for the better-off, clothing was "used until death and then reused", and the cut was generous to allow for this.

== On the body ==
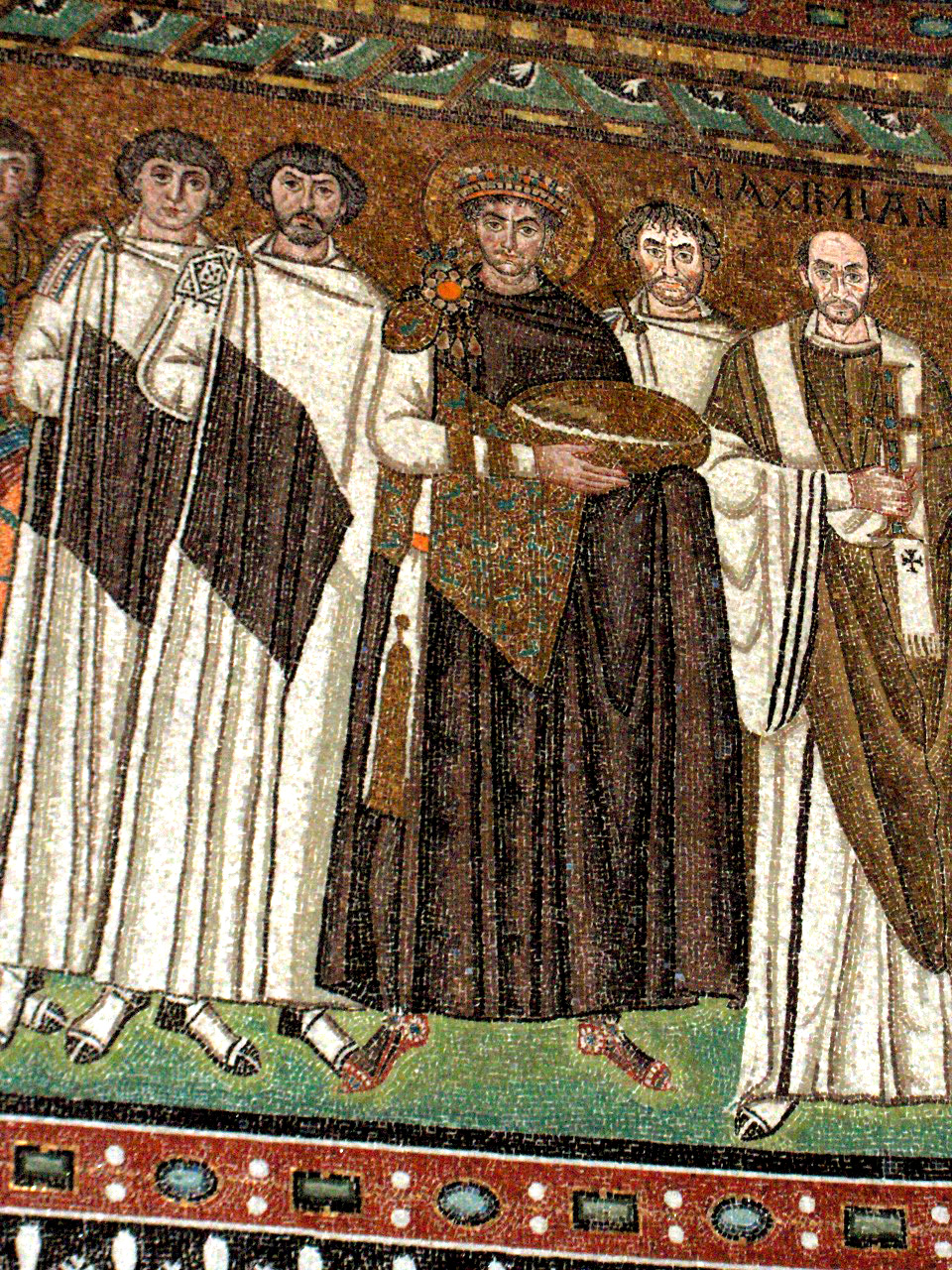
Mosaic from the San Vitale church in Ravenna. Few later emperors would dress so simply as in a mosaic as Justinian I here, though his dress is far richer at every point than his attendants'. He and they have the tablion diagonally across their torsos. This bishop probably wore this style of dress, which is very close to modern church vestments, for most of the time. Note what appears to be shoes and socks.

In the early stages of the Byzantine Empire the traditional Roman toga was still used as very formal or official dress. By Justinian's time this had been replaced by the tunica, or long chiton, for both sexes, over which the upper classes wore other garments, like a dalmatica (dalmatic), a heavier and shorter type of tunica, again worn by both sexes, but mainly by men. The hems often curve down to a sharp point. The scaramangion was a riding-coat of Persian origin, opening down the front and normally coming to the mid-thigh, although these are recorded as being worn by Emperors, when they seem to become much longer. In general, except for military and presumably riding-dress, men of higher status, and all women, had clothes that came down to the ankles, or nearly so. Women often wore a top layer of the stola, for the rich in brocade. All of these, except the stola, might be belted or not. The terms for dress are often confusing, and certain identification of the name a particular pictured item had, or the design that relates to a particular documentary reference, is rare, especially outside the Court.

The chlamys, a semicircular cloak fastened to the right shoulder, continued throughout the period. The length fell sometimes only to the hips or as far as the ankles, much longer than the version commonly worn in Ancient Greece; the longer version is also called a paludamentum. As well as his courtiers, Emperor Justinian wears one, with a huge brooch, in the Ravenna mosaics. On each straight edge men of the senatorial class had a tablion, a lozenge shaped coloured panel across the chest or midriff (at the front), which was also used to show the further rank of the wearer by the colour or type of embroidery and jewels used (compare those of Justinian and his courtiers). Theodosius I and his co-emperors were shown in 388 with theirs at knee level in the Missorium of Theodosius I of 387, but over the next decades the tablion can be seen to move higher on the Chlamys, for example in ivories of 413-414. A paragauda or border of thick cloth, usually including gold, was also an indicator of rank. Sometimes an oblong cloak would be worn, especially by the military and ordinary people; it was not for court occasions. Cloaks were pinned on the right shoulder for ease of movement, and access to a sword.

Leggings and hose were often worn, but are not prominent in depictions of the wealthy; they were associated with barbarians, whether European or Persian. Even basic clothes appear to have been surprisingly expensive for the poor. Some manual workers, probably slaves, are shown continuing to wear, at least in summer, the basic Roman slip costume which was effectively two rectangles sewn together at the shoulders and below the arm. Others, when engaged in activity, are shown with the sides of their tunic tied up to the waist for ease of movement.

== Iconographic dress ==
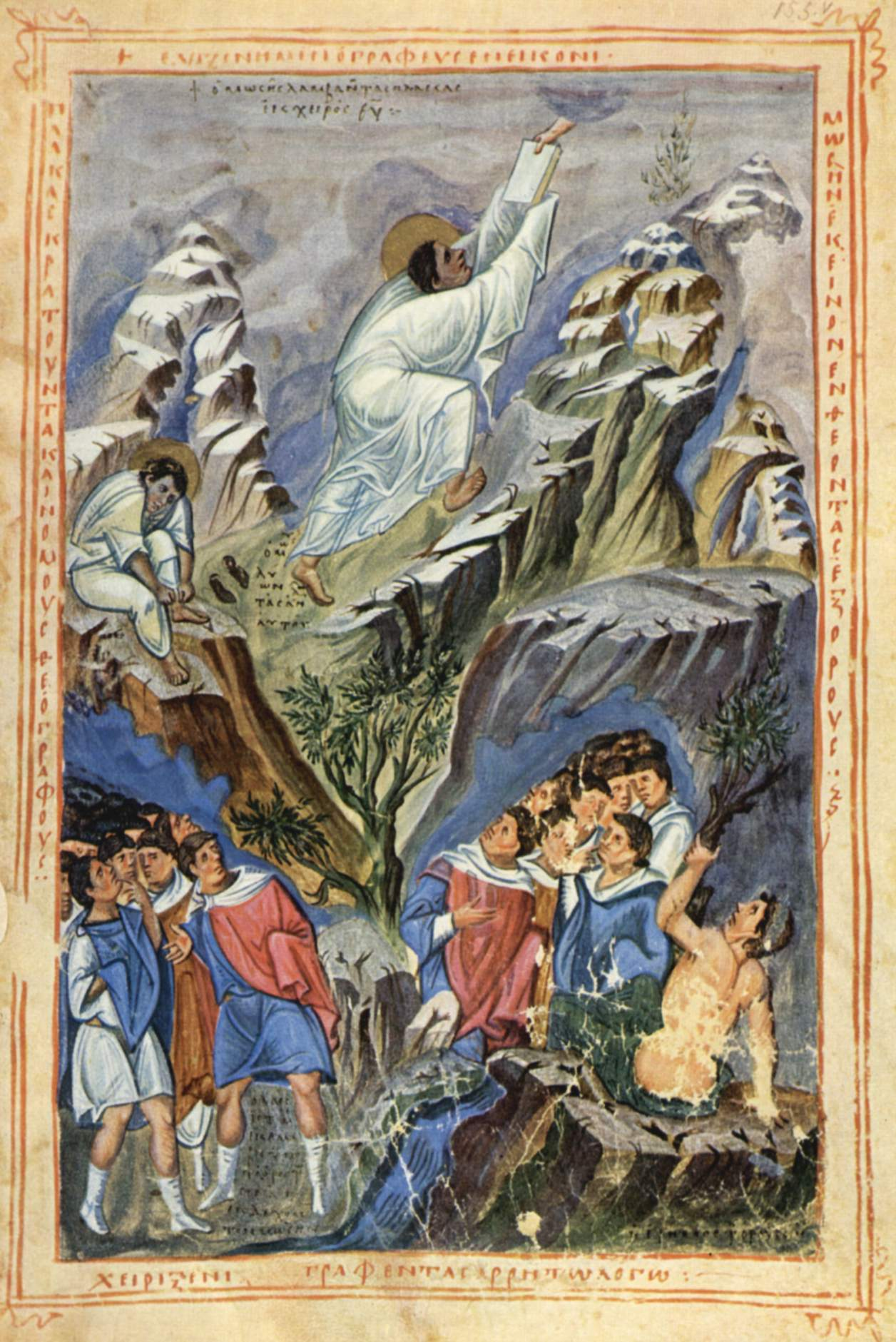
Moses has iconographic dress, the others everyday contemporary clothes, 10th century

The most common images surviving from the Byzantine period are not relevant as references for actual dress worn in the period. Christ (often even as a baby), the Apostles, Saint Joseph, Saint John the Baptist and some others are nearly always shown wearing formulaic "pseudo-Biblical dress", consisting of a large himation, a large rectangular mantle wrapped round the body (almost a toga), over a chiton, or loose sleeved tunic, reaching to the ankles. Sandals are worn on the feet. This costume is not commonly seen in secular contexts, although possibly this is deliberate, to avoid confusing secular with divine subjects. The Theotokos (Virgin Mary) is shown wearing a maphorion, a more shaped mantle with a hood and sometimes a hole at the neck. This probably is close to actual typical dress for widows, and for married women when in public. The Virgin's underdress may be visible, especially at the sleeves. There are also conventions for Old Testament prophets and other Biblical figures. Apart from Christ and the Virgin, much iconographic dress is white or relatively muted in colour especially when on walls (murals and mosaics) and in manuscripts, but more brightly coloured in icons. Many other figures in Biblical scenes, especially if unnamed, are usually depicted wearing "contemporary" Byzantine clothing.

== Female dress ==
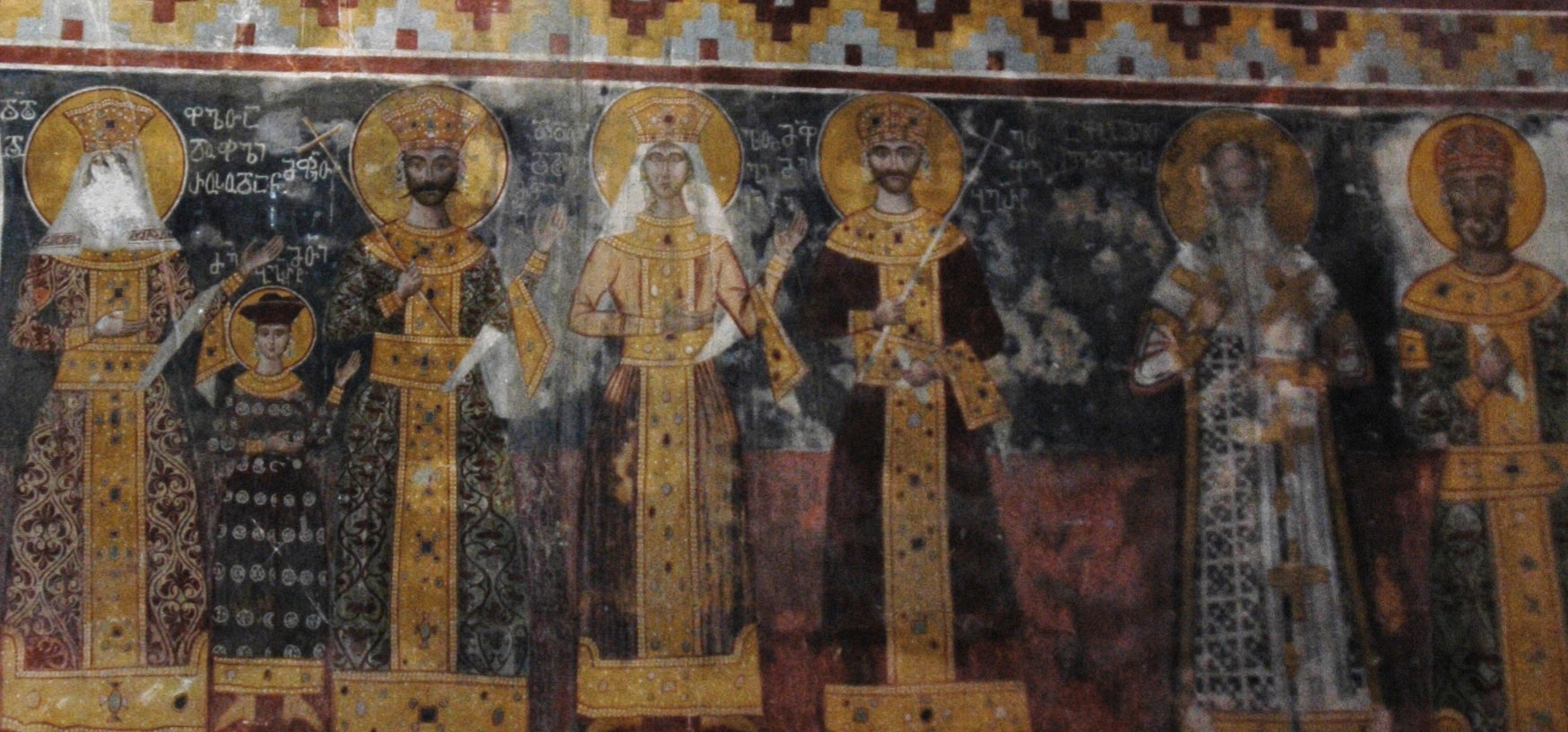
Kings of Georgia and queens consort wearing Byzantine dress. A fresco from the Gelati Monastery.

Modesty was important for all, and most women appear almost entirely covered by rather shapeless clothes, which needed to be able to accommodate a full pregnancy. The basic garment in the early Empire comes down to the ankles, with a high round collar and tight sleeves to the wrist. The fringes and cuffs might be decorated with embroidery, with a band around the upper arm as well. In the 10th and 11th century a dress with flared sleeves, eventually very full indeed at the wrist, becomes increasingly popular, before disappearing; working women are shown with the sleeves tied up. In court ladies this may come with a V-collar. Belts were normally worn, possibly with belt-hooks to support the skirt; they may have been cloth more often than leather, and some tasselled sashes are seen. Neck openings were probably often buttoned, which is hard to see in art, and not described in texts, but must have been needed if only for breast-feeding. Straight down, across, or diagonally are the possible options. The plain linen undergarment was, until the 10th century, not designed to be visible. However at this point a standing collar starts to show above the main dress.

Hair is covered by a variety of head-cloths and veils, presumably often removed inside the home. Sometimes caps were worn under the veil, and sometimes the cloth is tied in turban style. This may have been done while working - for example the midwives in scenes of the Nativity of Jesus in art usually adopt this style. Earlier ones were wrapped in a figure-of-eight fashion, but by the 11th century circular wrapping, possibly sewn into a fixed position, was adopted. In the 11th and 12th centuries head-cloths or veils began to be longer.

With footwear, scholars are more certain, as there are considerable numbers of examples recovered by archaeology from the drier parts of the Empire. A great variety of footwear is found, with sandals, slippers and boots to the mid-calf all common in manuscript illustrations and excavated finds, where many are decorated in various ways. The colour red, reserved for Imperial use in male footwear, is actually by far the most common colour for women's shoes. Purses are rarely visible, and seem to have been made of textile matching the dress, or perhaps tucked into the sash.

Dancers are shown with special dress including short sleeves or sleeveless dresses, which may or may not have a lighter sleeve from an undergarment below. They have tight wide belts, and their skirts have a flared and differently coloured element, probably designed to rise up as they spin in dances. A remark of Anna Komnene about her mother suggests that not showing the arm above the wrist was a special focus of Byzantine modesty.

Although it is sometimes claimed that the face-veil was invented by the Byzantines, Byzantine art does not depict women with veiled faces, although it commonly depicts women with veiled hair. It is assumed that Byzantine women outside court circles went well wrapped up in public, and were relatively restricted in their movements outside the house; they are rarely depicted in art. The literary sources are not sufficiently clear to distinguish between a head-veil and a face-veil. In addition, the early 3rd-century Christian writer Tertullian, in his treatise The Veiling of Virgins, Ch. 17, describes pagan Arab women as veiling the entire face except the eyes, in the manner of a niqab. This shows that some Middle Eastern women veiled their faces long before Islam.

== Colour ==
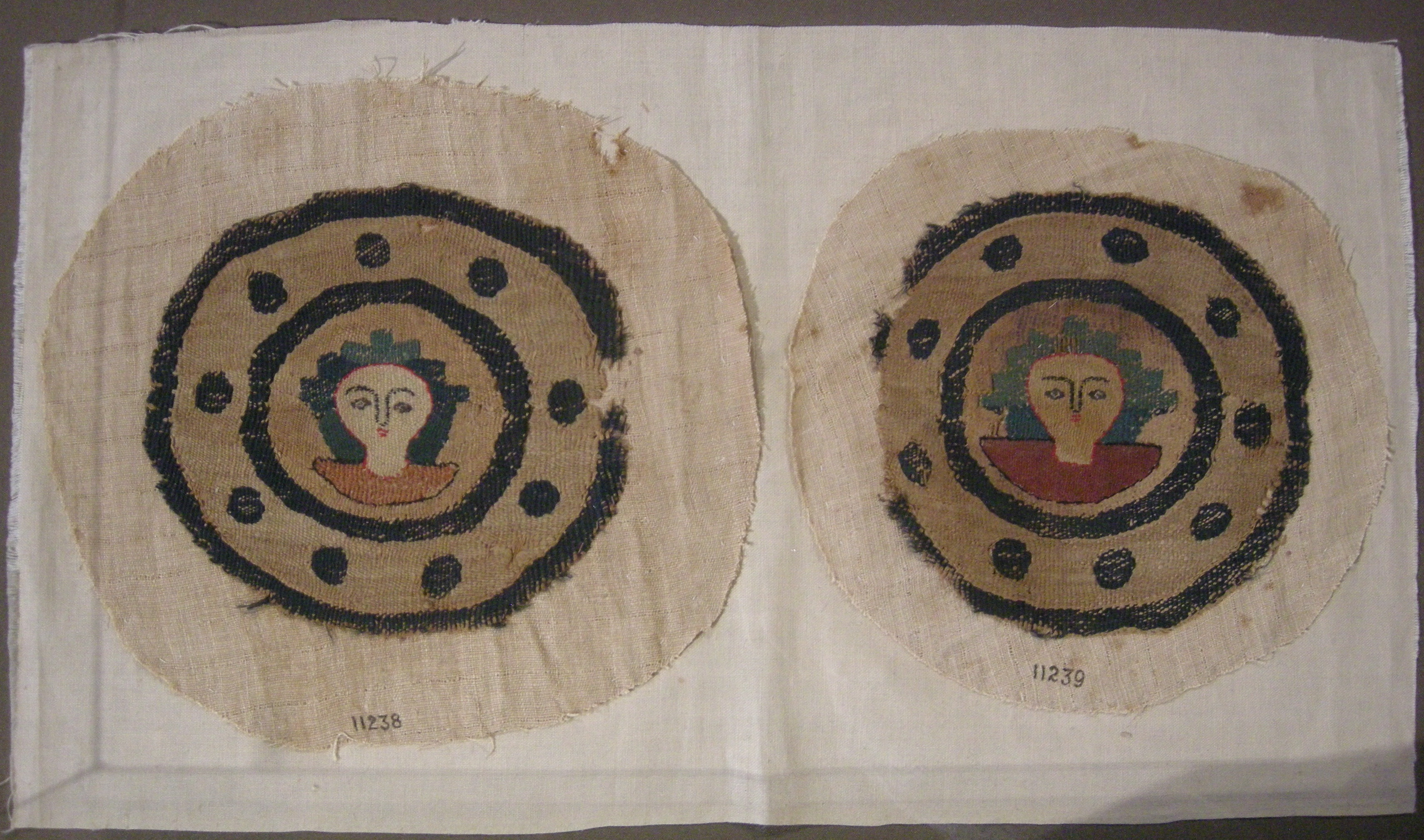
Two embroidered roundels from an Egyptian 7th century tunic

As in Graeco-Roman times, purple was reserved for the royal family; other colours in various contexts conveyed information as to class and clerical or government rank. Lower-class people wore simple tunics but still had the preference for bright colours found in all Byzantine fashions.

The races in the Hippodrome used four teams: red, white, blue and green; and the supporters of these became Political factions, taking sides on the great theological issues—which were also political questions—of Arianism, Nestorianism and Monophysitism, and therefore on the Imperial claimants who also took sides. Huge riots took place, in the 4th to 6th centuries and mostly in Constantinople, with deaths running into the thousands, between these factions, who naturally dressed in their appropriate colours. In medieval France, there were similar colours-wearing political factions, called chaperons.

== Example ==
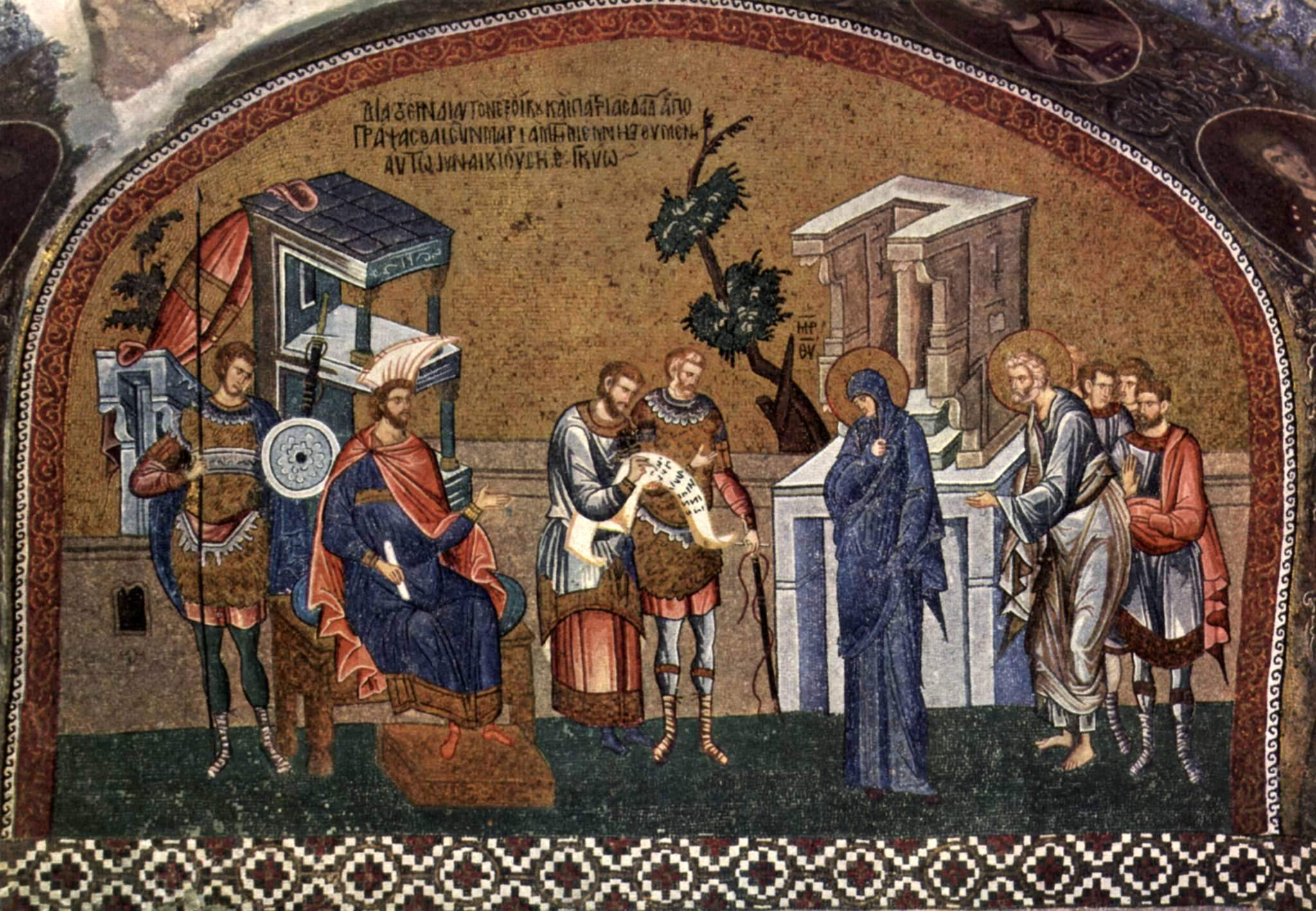
The Virgin and St. Joseph register for the census before Governor Quirinius, mosaic in the Chora Church (1315-20). See text

A 14th-century mosaic (right) from the Kahriye-Cami or Chora Church in Istanbul gives an excellent view of a range of costume from the late period. From the left, there is a soldier on guard, the governor in one of the large hats worn by important officials, a middle-ranking civil servant (holding the register roll) in a dalmatic with a wide border, probably embroidered, over a long tunic, which also has a border. Then comes a higher-ranking soldier, carrying a sword on an untied belt or baldric. The Virgin and St Joseph are in their normal iconographic dress, and behind St Joseph a queue of respectable citizens wait their turn to register. Male hem lengths drop as the status of the person increases. All the exposed legs have hose, and the soldiers and citizens have foot-wrappings above, presumably with sandals. The citizens wear dalmatics with a wide border around the neck and hem, but not as rich as that of the middle-level official. The other men would perhaps wear hats if not in the presence of the governor. A donor figure in the same church, the Grand Logothete Theodore Metochites, who ran the legal system and finances of the Empire, wears an even larger hat, which he keeps on whilst kneeling before Christ (see Gallery).

== Hats ==
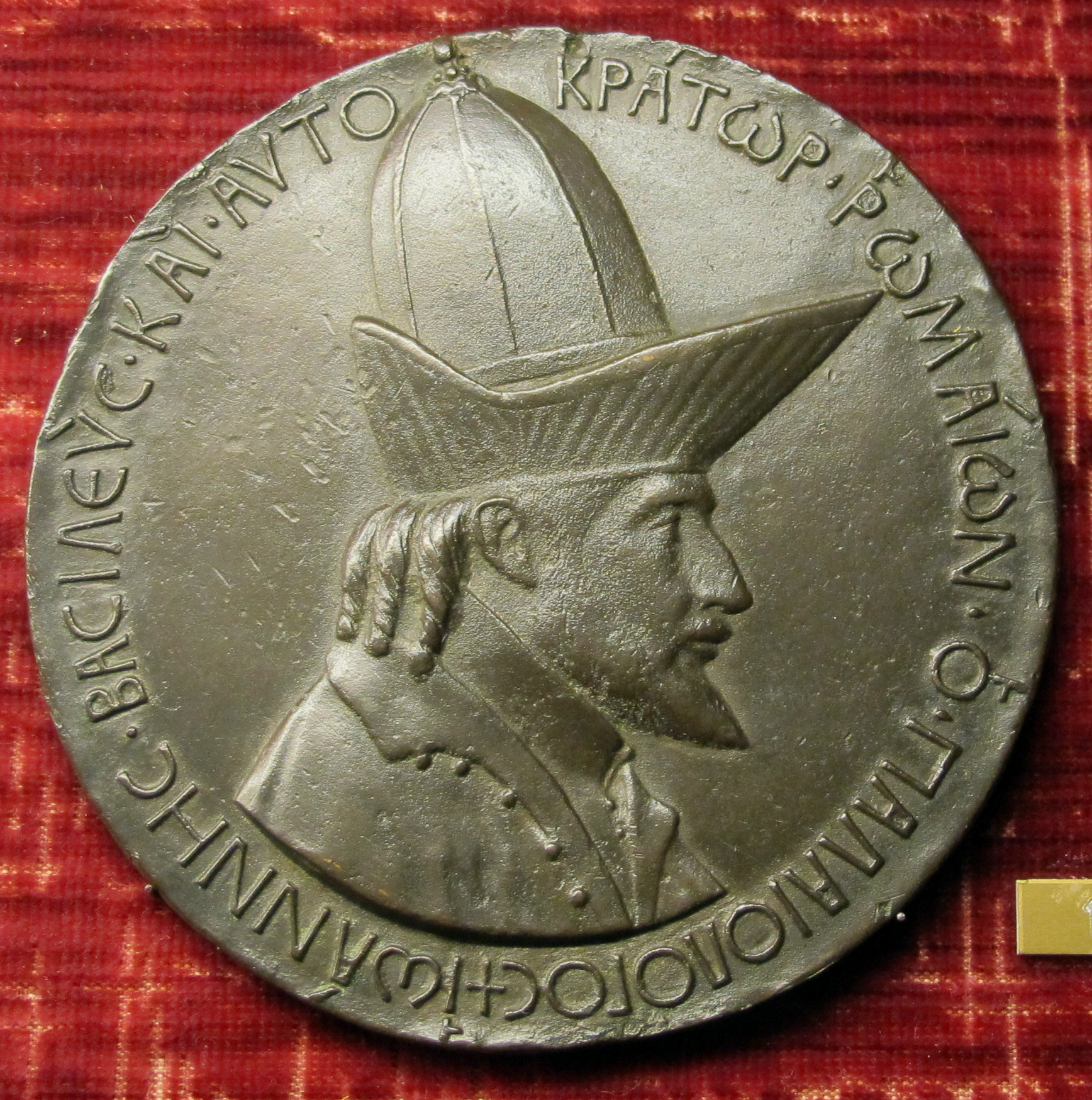
Medal of John VIII Palaeologus by Pisanello, who saw him at Ferrara in 1438

Many men went bareheaded and, apart from the Emperor, they were normally so in votive depictions, which may distort the record we have. In the late Byzantine period a number of extravagantly large hats were worn as uniform by officials. In the 12th century, Emperor Andronikos Komnenos wore a hat shaped like a pyramid, but eccentric dress is one of many things he was criticised for. This was perhaps related to the very elegant hat with a very high-domed peak, and a sharply turned-up brim coming far forward in an acute triangle to a sharp point (left), that was drawn by Italian artists when the Emperor John VIII Palaiologos went to Florence and the Council of Ferrara in 1438 in the last days of the Empire. Versions of this and other clothes, including many spectacular hats, worn by the visitors were carefully drawn by Pisanello and other artists. They passed through copies across Europe for use in Eastern subjects, especially for depictions of the three kings or Magi in Nativity scenes. In 1159 the visiting Crusader Prince Raynald of Châtillon wore a tiara shaped felt cap, embellished in gold. An Iberian wide brimmed felt hat came into vogue during the 12th century. Especially in the Balkans, small caps with or without fur brims were worn, of the sort later adopted by the Russian Tsars.

== Shoes ==
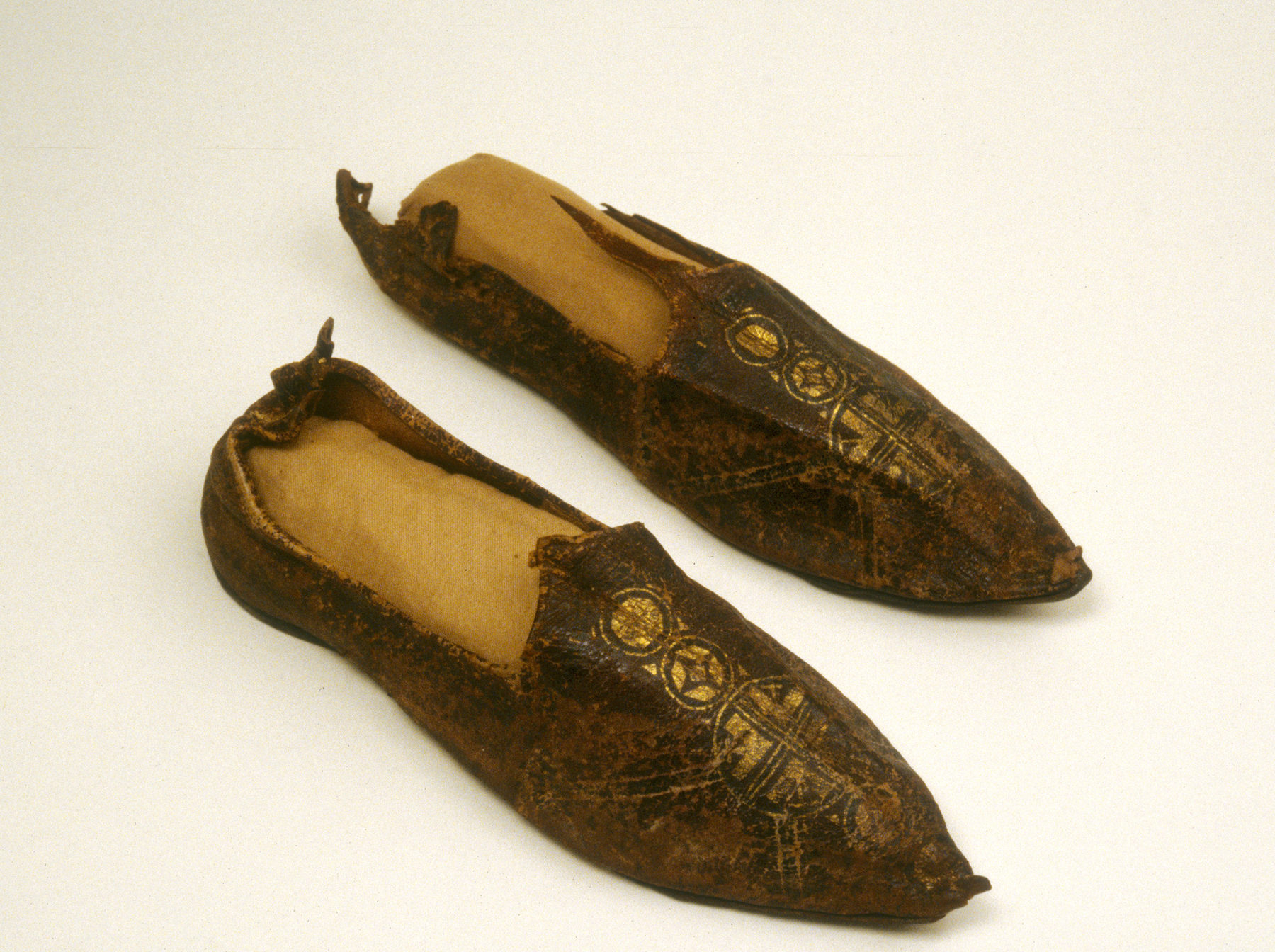
Byzantine men's shoes of partially gilded leather, 6th century, Walters Art Museum.

Not many shoes are seen clearly in Byzantine Art because of the long robes of the rich. Red shoes marked the Emperor; blue shoes, a sebastokrator; and green shoes a protovestiarios.

The Ravenna mosaics show the men wearing what may be sandals with white socks, and soldiers wear sandals tied around the calf or strips of cloth wrapped round the leg to the calf. These probably went all the way to the toes (similar foot-wrappers are still worn by Russian other ranks).

Some soldiers, including later Imperial portraits in military dress, show boots nearly reaching the knee - red for the Emperor. In the Imperial Regalia of the Holy Roman Emperors there are shoes or slippers in Byzantine style made in Palermo before 1220. They are short, only to the ankle, and generously cut to allow many different sizes to be accommodated. They are lavishly decorated with pearls and jewels and gold scrollwork on the sides and over the toe of the shoe. More practical footwear was no doubt worn on less formal occasions.

Outside labourers would either have sandals or be barefoot. The sandals follow the Roman model of straps over a thick sole. Some examples of the Roman caligae or military boot are also seen on shepherds.

== Military costume ==
This stayed close to the Greco-Roman pattern, especially for officers (see Gallery section for example). A breastplate of armour, under which the bottom of a short tunic appeared as a skirt, often overlaid with a fringe of leather straps, the pteruges. Similar strips covered the upper arms, below round armour shoulder-pieces. Boots came to the calf, or sandals were strapped high on the legs. A rather flimsy-looking cloth belt is tied high under the ribs as a badge of rank rather than a practical item.

Dress and equipment changed considerably across the period to have the most efficient and effective accoutrements current economics would allow. Other ranks' clothing was largely identical to that of common working men. The manuals recommend tunics and coats no longer than the knee. As an army marches first of all on its feet, the manual writers were more concerned that troops should have good footwear than anything else. This ranged from low lace up shoes to thigh boots, all to be fitted with "a few (hob) nails". A head-cloth ("phakiolion" or "maphorion") which ranged from a simple cloth coming from below the helmet (as still worn by Orthodox clergy) to something more like a turban, was standard military headgear in the Middle and Late Empire for both common troops and for ceremonial wear by some ranks; they were also worn by women.

== Imperial costume ==
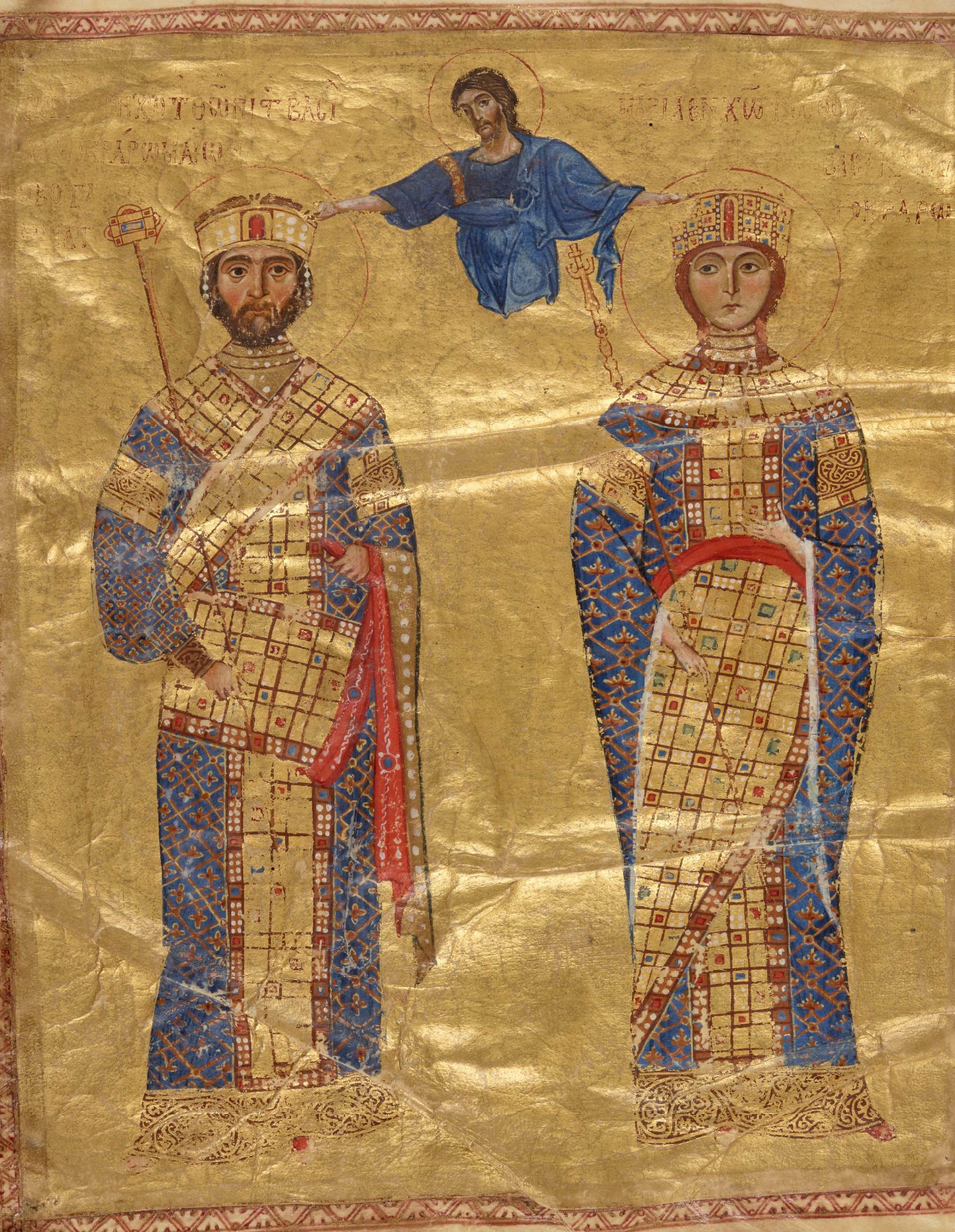
Emperor and Empress in the loros costume, Nicephorus III and Maria of Alania. 1074-81

The distinctive garments of the Emperors (often there were two at a time) and Empresses were the crown and the heavily jewelled Imperial loros or pallium, that developed from the trabea triumphalis, a ceremonial coloured version of the Roman toga worn by Consuls (during the reign of Justinian I Consulship became part of the imperial status), and worn by the Emperor and Empress as a quasi-ecclesiastical garment. It was also worn by the twelve most important officials and the imperial bodyguard, and hence by Archangels in icons, who were seen as divine bodyguards, its main purpose was ideological, representing the different Hellenistic political values such as the deification of the monarch and his role as the sole legislator and administrator of the commonwealth. In practice it was only normally worn a few times a year, such as on Easter Sunday, but it was very commonly used for depictions in art.

The men's version of the loros was a long strip, dropping down straight in front to below the waist, and with the portion behind pulled round to the front and hung gracefully over the left arm. The female loros was similar at the front end, but the back end was wider and tucked under a belt after pulling through to the front again. Both male and female versions changed style and diverged in the middle Byzantine period, the female later reverting to the new male style. Apart from jewels and embroidery, small enamelled plaques were sewn into the clothes; the dress of Manuel I Comnenus was described as being like a meadow covered with flowers. Generally sleeves were closely fitted to the arm and the outer dress comes to the ankles (although often called a scaramangion), and is also rather closely fitted. The sleeves of empresses became extremely wide in the later period.

The royal daily robe was a simpler and more idealized regalia of the various Hellenistic kings, depicted in various frescoes and miniatures, which featured the emperor in a simple "chiton" robe, a "chlamys" of various sizes, a royal diadem and the imperial boots Tzangion of which elaborated examples are evidenced in imperial works such as the Paris psalter or the David plates, idealizing the concept of philanthropy and beneficence as the main roles of the perfect Hellenistic and Byzantine monarch.

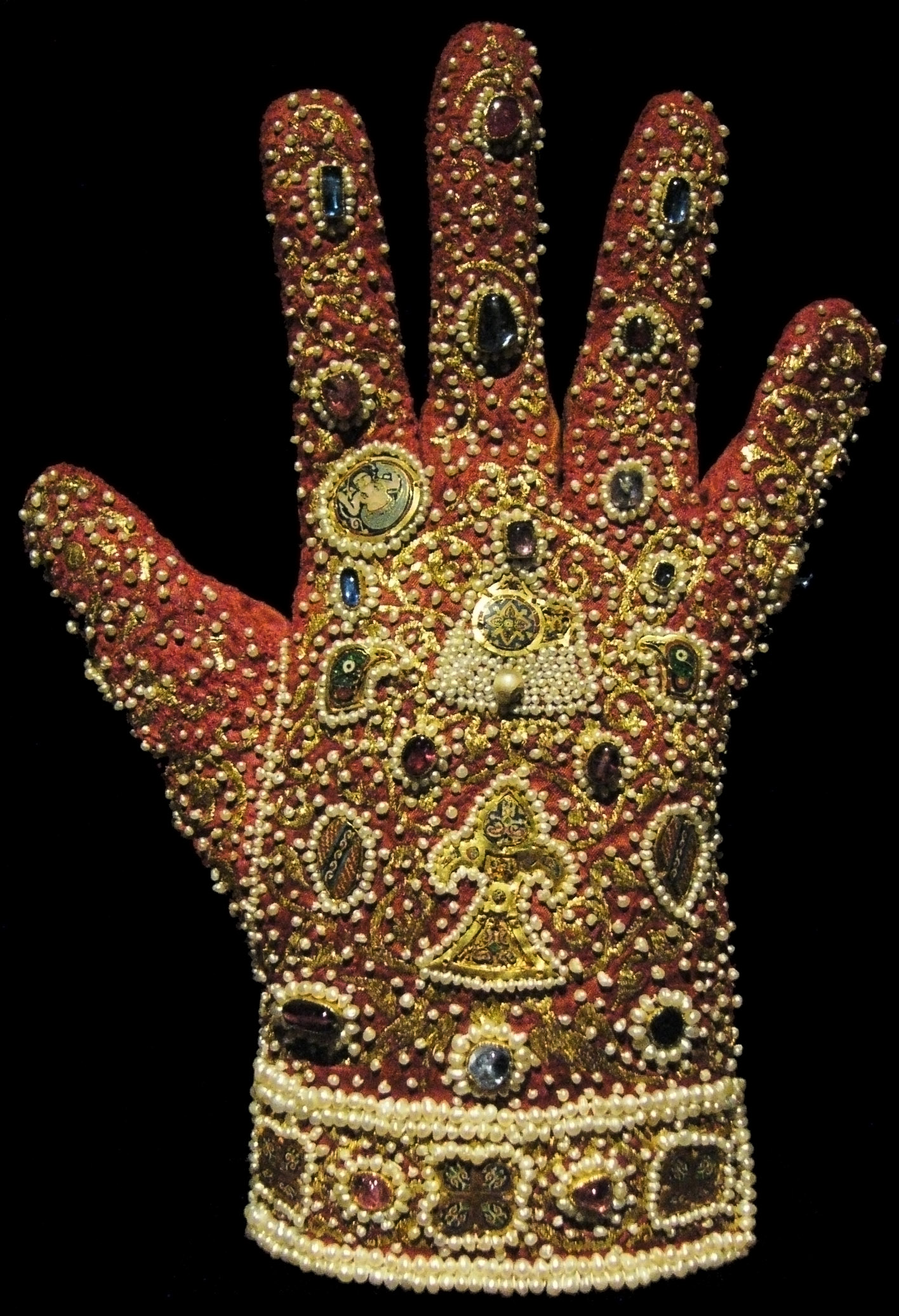
Glove from the Imperial Regalia of the Holy Roman Emperors in Vienna, including enamelled plaques. Palermo, c. 1220

The superhumeral, worn throughout the history of Byzantium, was the imperial decorative collar, often forming part of the loros. It was copied by at least women of the upper class. It was of cloth of gold or similar material, then studded with gems and heavily embroidered. The decoration was generally divided into compartments by vertical lines on the collar. The edges would be done in pearls of varying sizes in up to three rows. There were occasionally drop pearls placed at intervals to add to the richness. The collar came over the collarbone to cover a portion of the upper chest.

The Imperial Regalia of the Holy Roman Emperors, kept in the Schatzkammer (Vienna), contains a full set of outer garments made in the 12th century in essentially Byzantine style at the Byzantine-founded workshops in Palermo. These are among the best surviving Byzantine garments and give a good idea of the lavishness of Imperial ceremonial clothing. There is a cloak (worn by the Emperors with the gap at the front), "alb", dalmatic, stockings, slippers and gloves. The loros is Italian and later. Each element of the design on the cloak (see Textiles below) is outlined in pearls and embroidered in gold.

Especially in the early and later periods (approximately before 600 and after 1,000) Emperors may be shown in military dress, with gold breastplates, red boots, and a crown. Crowns had pendilia and became closed on top during the 12th century.

== Court dress ==
Court life "passed in a sort of ballet", with precise ceremonies prescribed for every occasion, to show that "Imperial power could be exercised in harmony and order", and "the Empire could thus reflect the motion of the Universe as it was made by the Creator", according to the Emperor Constantine Porphyrogenitus, who wrote a Book of Ceremonies describing in enormous detail the annual round of the Court. Special forms of dress for many classes of people on particular occasions are set down; at the name-day dinner for the Emperor or Empress various groups of high officials performed ceremonial "dances", one group wearing "a blue and white garment, with short sleeves, and gold bands, and rings on their ankles. In their hands they hold what are called phengia". The second group do just the same, but wearing "a garment of green and red, split, with gold bands". These colours were the marks of the old chariot racing factions, the four now merged to just the Blues and the Greens, and incorporated into the official hierarchy. At this period a court official could be required to wear five different outfits over a single festival day, his costumes being provided as part of his pay package.

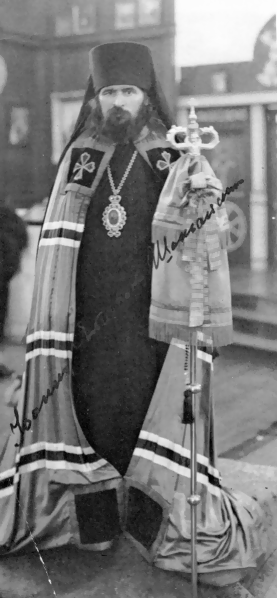
The Russian Orthodox Archbishop John Maximovich in 1934, in clerical garb with many Byzantine features

Various tactica, treatises on administrative structure, court protocol and precedence, give details of the costumes worn by different office-holders. According to pseudo-Kodinos, the distinctive colour of the Sebastokrator was blue; his ceremonial costume included blue shoes embroidered with eagles on a red field, a red tunic (chlamys), and a diadem (stephanos) in red and gold. As in the Versailles of Louis XIV, elaborate dress and court ritual probably were at least partly an attempt to smother and distract from political tensions.

However this ceremonial way of life came under stress as the military crisis deepened, and never revived after the interlude of the Western Emperors following the capture of Constantinople by the Fourth Crusade in 1204; in the late period a French visitor was shocked to see the Empress riding in the street with fewer attendants and less ceremony than a Queen of France would have had.

== Clerical dress ==
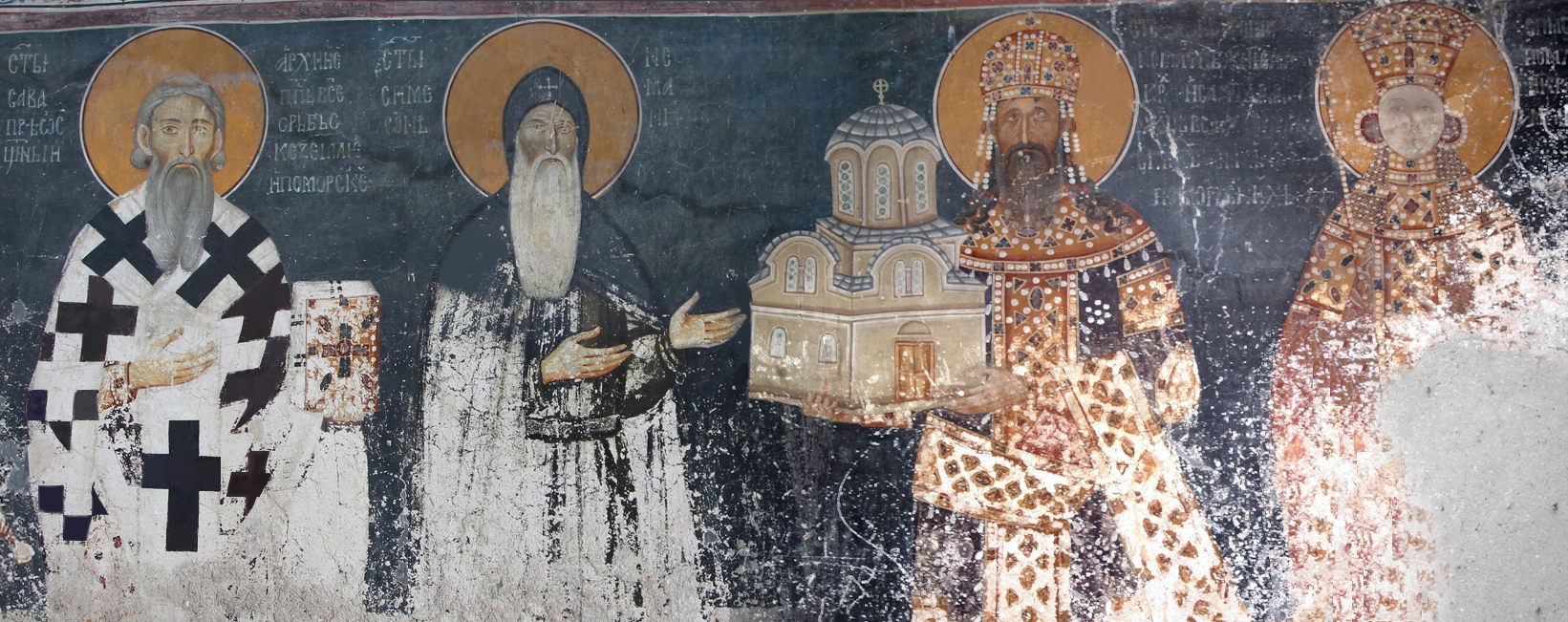
Serb kings, queens, nobility, monks and head of Serb Church wearing Byzantine dress. A fresco from the Serbian Orthodox Studenica Monastery.

This is certainly the area in which Byzantine and classic clothing is nearest to living on, as many forms of habit and vestments still in use (especially in the Eastern, but also in the Western churches) are closely related to their predecessors. Over the period clerical dress went from being merely normal lay dress to a specialized set of garments for different purposes. The bishop in the Ravenna mosaic wears a chasuble very close to what is regarded as the "modern" Western form of the 20th century, the garment having become much larger, and then contracted, in the meantime. Over his shoulder he wears a simple bishop's omophorion, resembling the clerical pallium of the Latin Church, and a symbol of his position. This later became much larger, and produced various types of similar garments, such as the epitrachelion and orarion, for other ranks of clergy. Modern Orthodox clerical hats are also survivals from the much larger and brightly coloured official headgear of the Byzantine civil service.

== Hair ==
Men's hair was generally short and neat until the late Empire, and often is shown elegantly curled, probably artificially (picture at top). The 9th century Khludov Psalter has Iconophile illuminations which vilify the last Iconoclast Patriarch, John the Grammarian, caricaturing him with untidy hair sticking straight out in all directions. Monk's hair was long, and most clergy had beards, as did many lay men, especially later. Upper-class women mostly wore their hair up, again very often curled and elaborately shaped. If we are to judge by religious art, and the few depictions of other women outside the court, women probably kept their hair covered in public, especially when married.

== Textiles ==
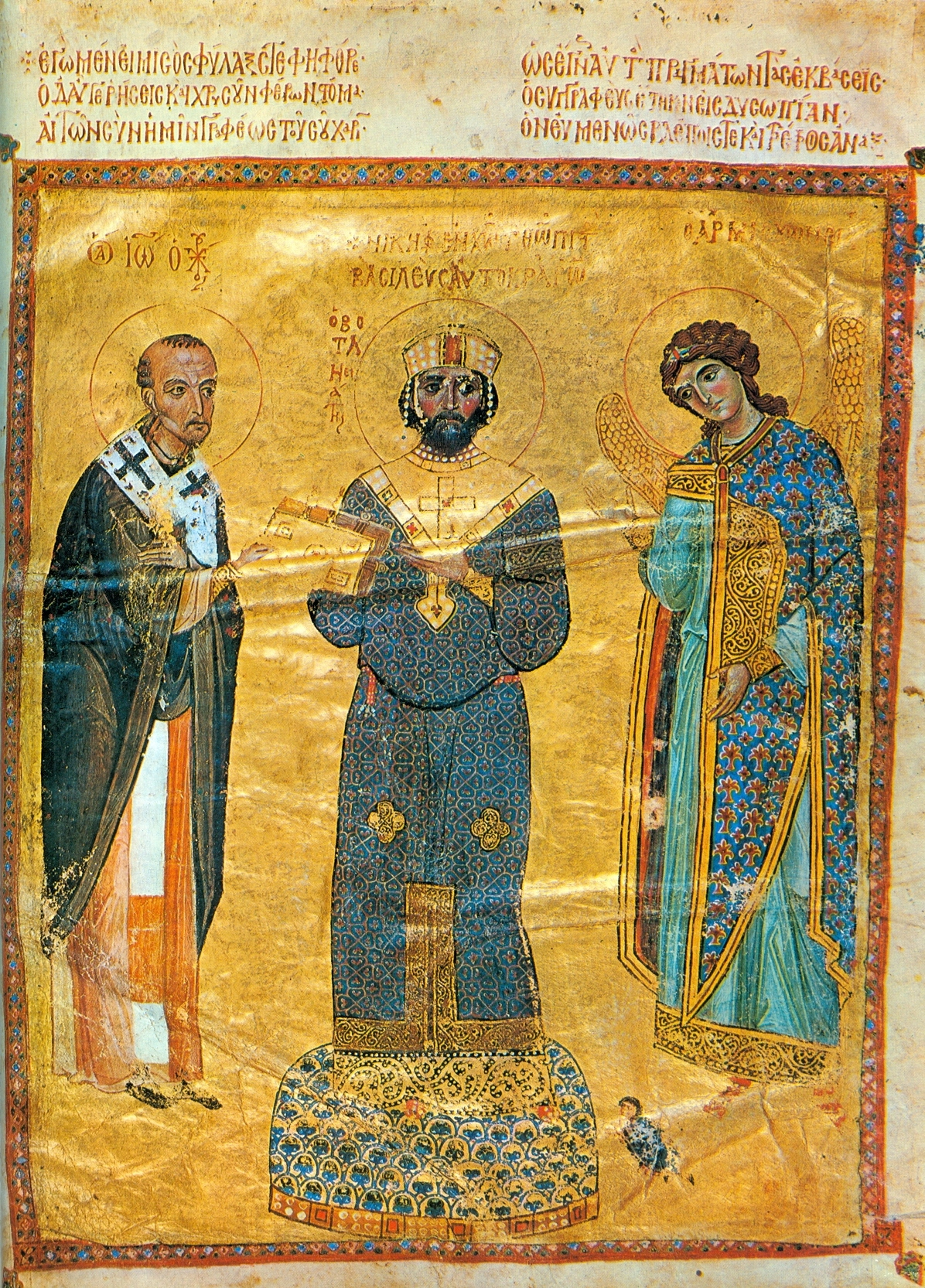
Manuscript illumination of Emperor Nicephorus III Botaniates (1078-81) flanked by St John Chrysostomos and the Archangel Michael

As in China, there were large Byzantine Imperial workshops, apparently always based in Constantinople, for textiles as for other arts like mosaic. Although there were other important centres, the Imperial workshops led fashion and technical developments and their products were frequently used as diplomatic gifts to other rulers, as well as being distributed to favoured Byzantines. In the late 10th century, the Emperor sent gold and fabrics to a Russian ruler in the hope that this would prevent him attacking the Empire.

Most surviving examples were not used for clothes and feature very large woven or embroidered designs. Before the Byzantine Iconoclasm these often contained religious scenes such as Annunciations, often in a number of panels over a large piece of cloth. This naturally stopped during the periods of Iconoclasm and with the exception of church vestments for the most part figural scenes did not reappear afterwards, being replaced by patterns and animal designs. Some examples show very large designs being used for clothing by the great - two enormous embroidered lions killing camels occupy the whole of the Coronation cloak of Roger II in Vienna, produced in Palermo about 1134 in the workshops the Byzantines had established there. A sermon by Saint Asterius of Amasia, from the end of the 5th century, gives details of imagery on the clothes of the rich (which he strongly condemns):

When, therefore, they dress themselves and appear in public, they look like pictured walls in the eyes of those that meet them. And perhaps even the children surround them, smiling to one another and pointing out with the finger the picture on the garment; and walk along after them, following them for a long time. On these garments are lions and leopards; bears and bulls and dogs; woods and rocks and hunters; and all attempts to imitate nature by painting.... But such rich men and women as are more pious, have gathered up the gospel history and turned it over to the weavers.... You may see the wedding of Galilee, and the water-pots; the paralytic carrying his bed on his shoulders; the blind man being healed with the clay; the woman with the bloody issue, taking hold of the border of the garment; the sinful woman falling at the feet of Jesus; Lazarus returning to life from the grave....

Both Christian and pagan examples, mostly embroidered panels sewn into plainer cloth, have been preserved in the exceptional conditions of graves in Egypt, although mostly iconic portrait-style images rather than the narrative scenes Asterius describes in his diocese of Amasia in northern Anatolia. The portrait of the Caesar Constantius Gallus in the Chronography of 354 shows several figurative panels on his clothes, mostly round or oval (see gallery).

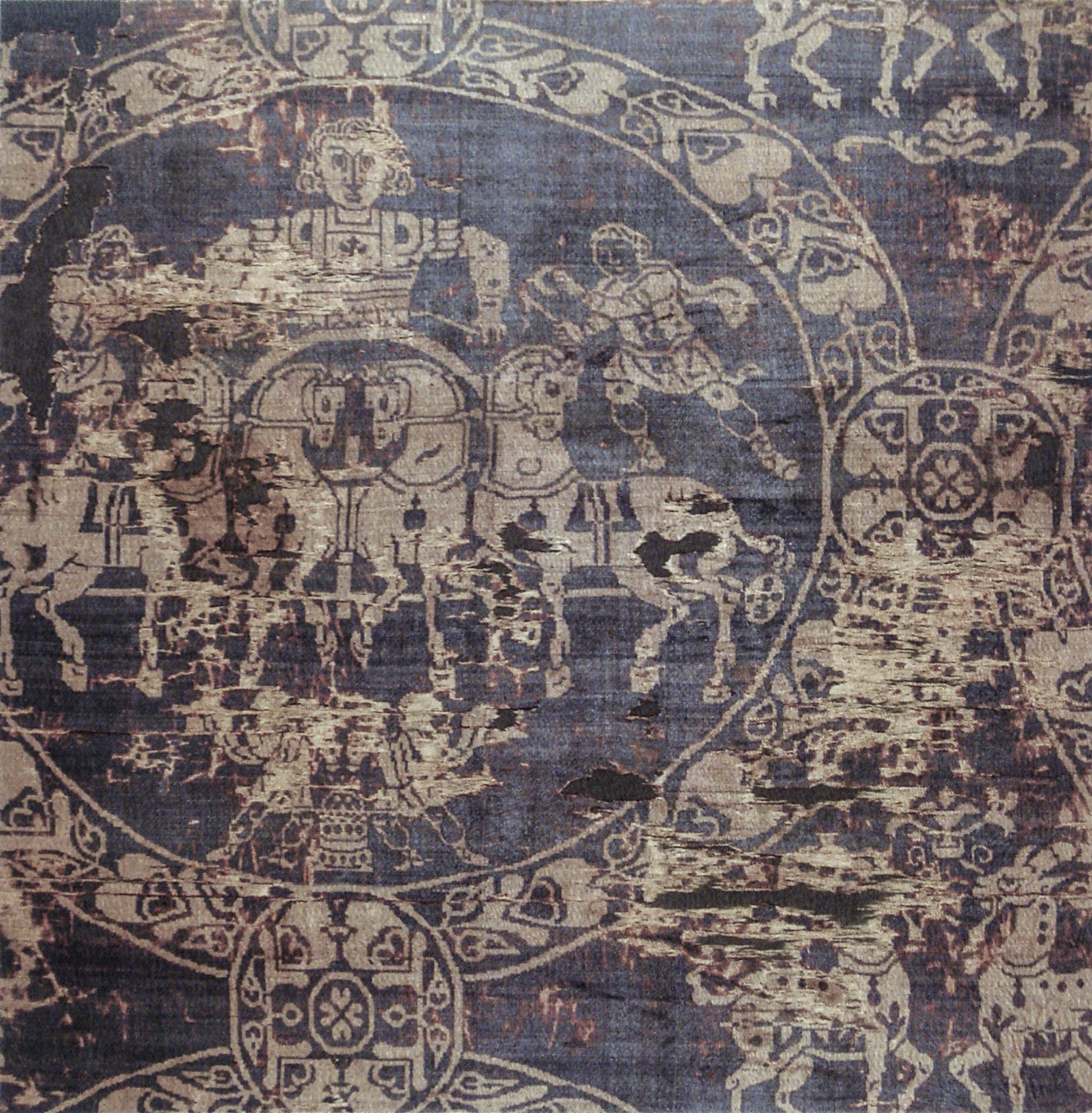
The silk shroud of Charlemagne manufactured in Constantinople c. 814

Early decorated cloth is mostly embroidered in wool on a linen base, and linen is generally more common than cotton throughout the period. Raw Silk yarn was initially imported from China, and the timing and place of the first weaving of it in the Near Eastern world is a matter of controversy, with Egypt, Persia, Syria and Constantinople all being proposed, for dates in the 4th and 5th centuries. Certainly Byzantine textile decoration shows great Persian influence, and very little direct from China. According to legend agents of Justinian I bribed two Buddhist monks from Khotan in about 552 to discover the secret of cultivating silk, although much continued to be imported from China.

Resist dyeing was common from the late Roman period for those outside the Court, and woodblock printing dates to at least the 6th century, and possibly earlier - again this would function as a cheaper alternative to the woven and embroidered materials of the rich. Apart from Egyptian burial-cloths, rather fewer cheap fabrics have survived than expensive ones. It should also be remembered that depicting a patterned fabric in paint or mosaic is a very difficult task, often impossible in a small miniature, so the artistic record, which often shows patterned fabrics in large-scale figures in the best quality works, probably under-records the use of patterned cloth overall.

== Gallery ==
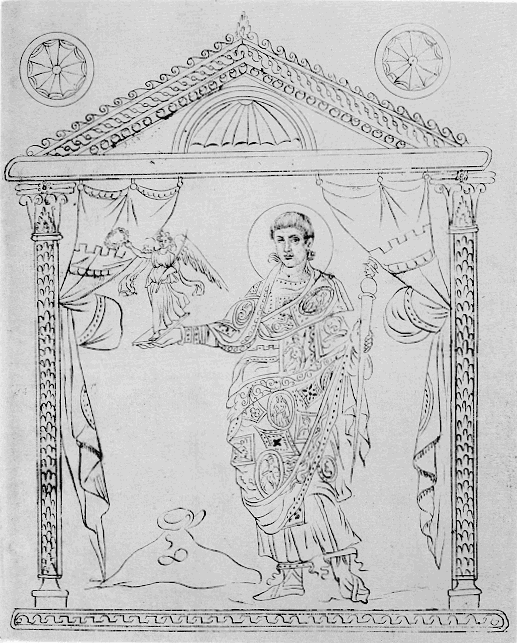
The Caesar Constantius Gallus in a later copy of the Chronography of 354, with one of the best surviving indications of what the pictures on clothes described by Asterius looked like.

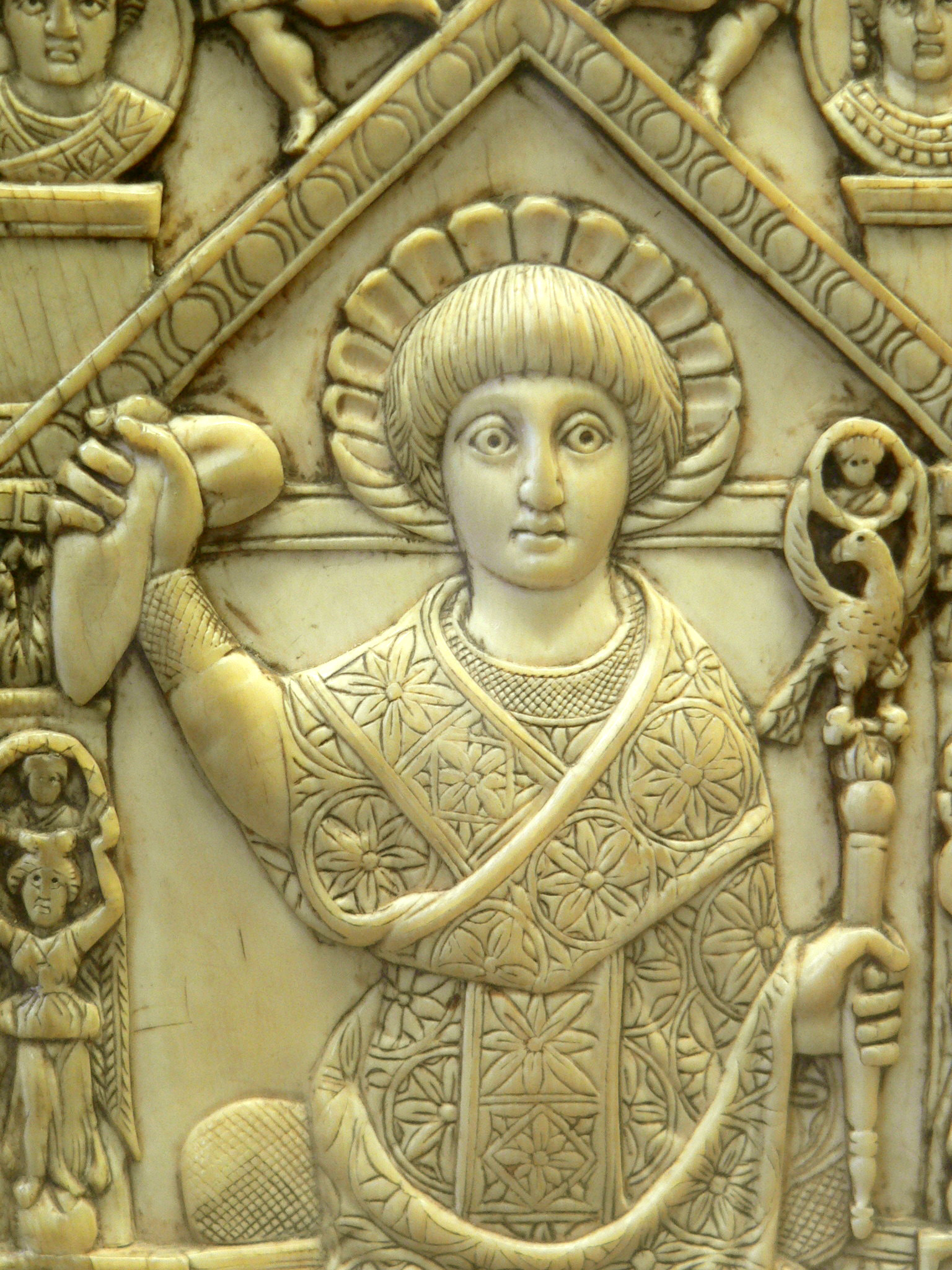
Consul Anastasius wearing consular robes akin to imperial ones. From his consular diptych, 517.

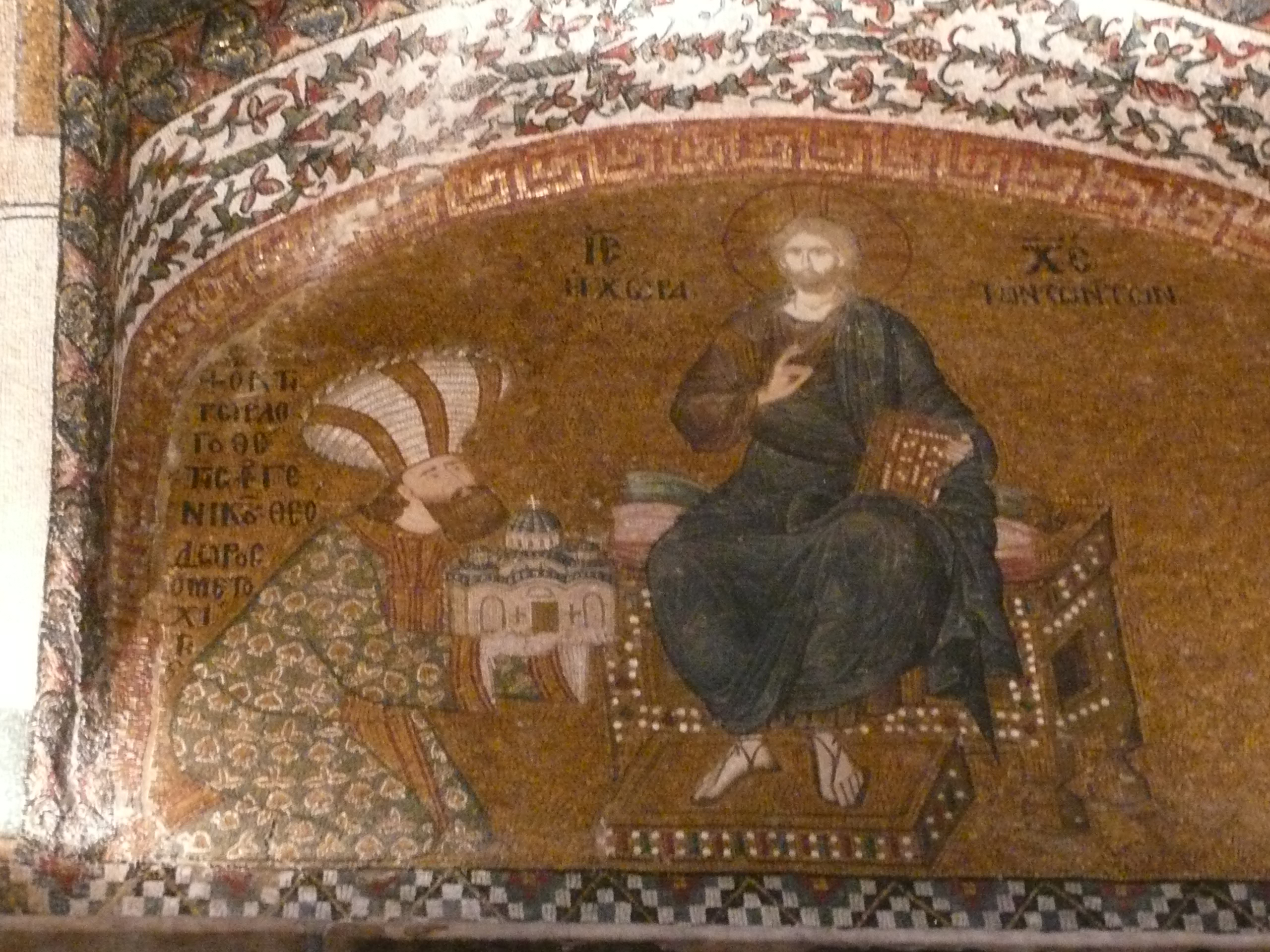
Chora Church, the Grand Logothete Theodore Metochites, who ran the legal system and finances of the Empire, wears an enormous hat, like all high officials, and a patterned robe.

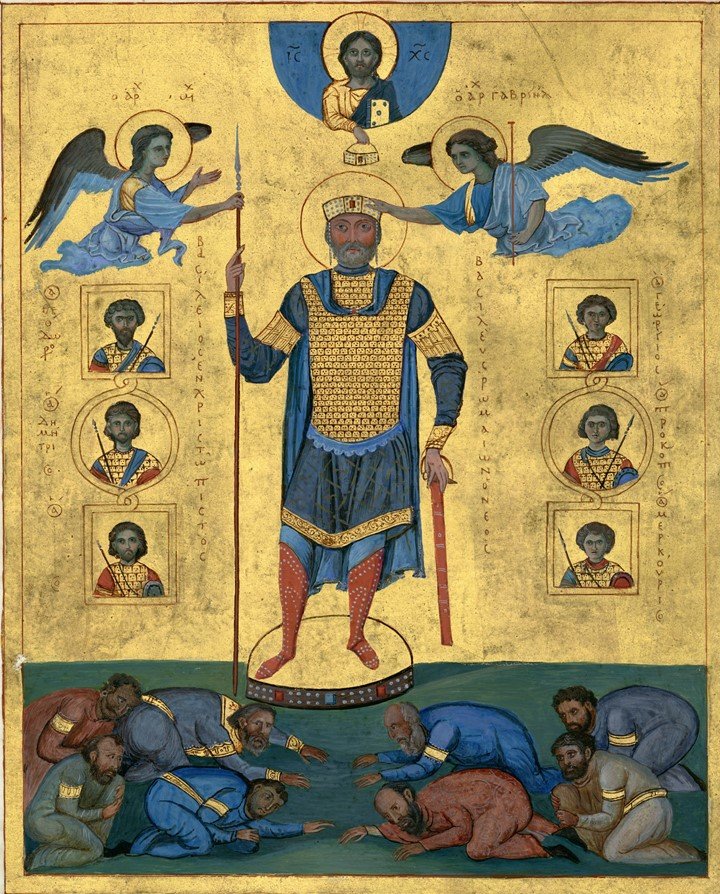
Basil II in military dress, early 11th century

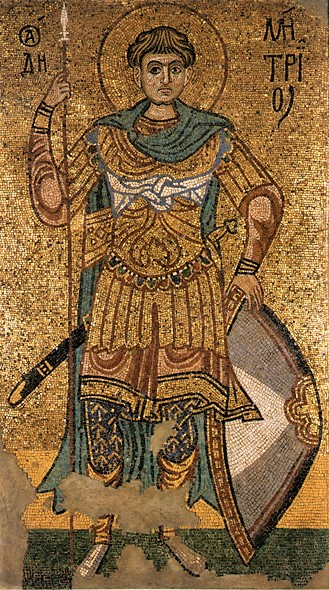
Saint Demetrius of Thessaloniki, 12th century Greek mosaic from Kyiv showing military dress, including the high sash around the ribs, as a badge of rank.

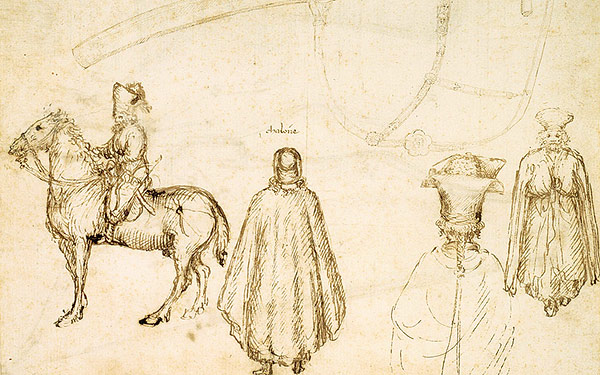
Sketches by Pisanello of the Byzantine delegation at the Council of Florence in 1439

== See also ==
- Clothing in ancient Greece
- Greek dress
- Ottoman clothing
- Sasanian dress
