= Tzangion =

Type of boot or sandal in the Middle Ages

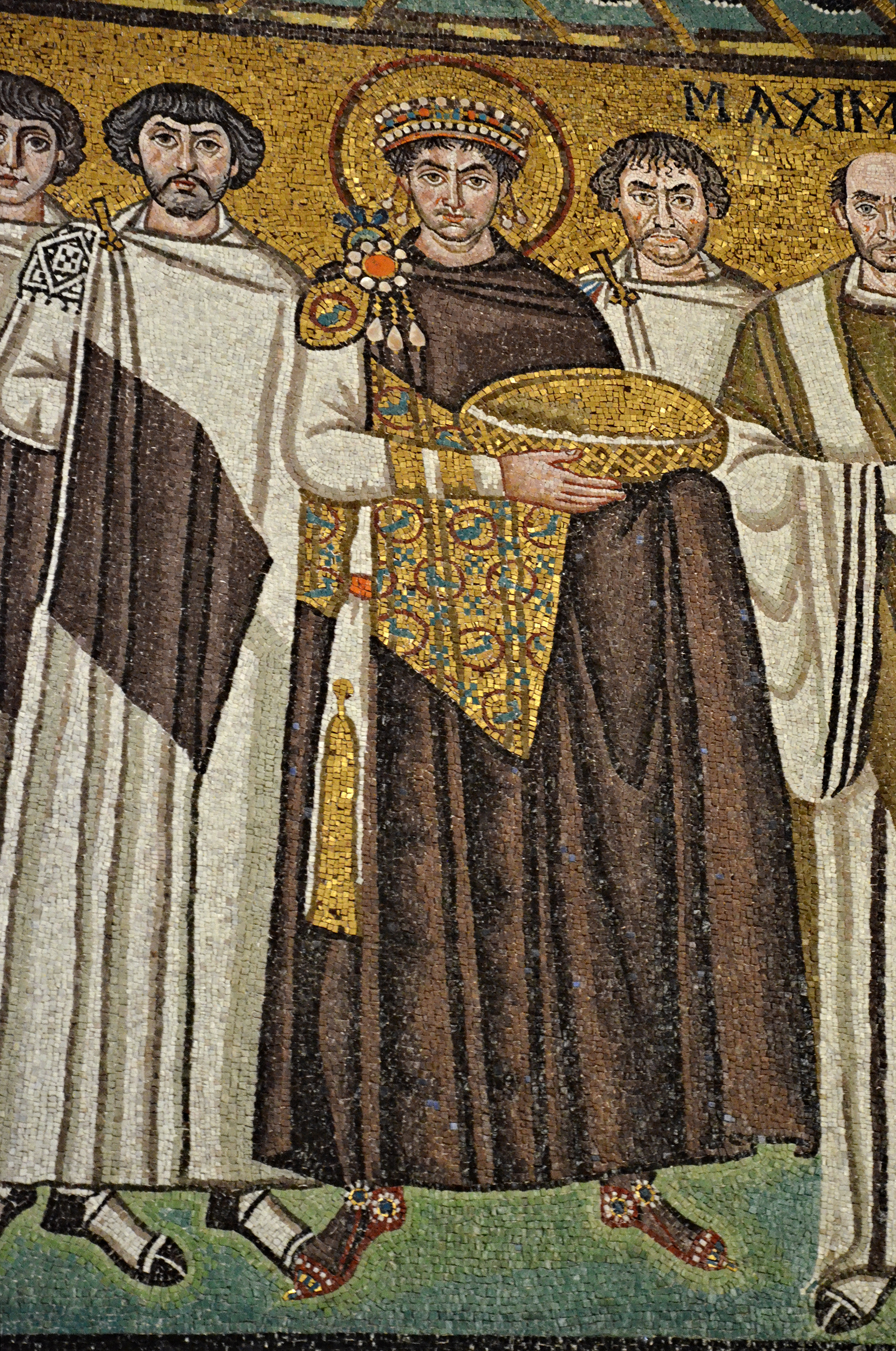
Contemporary portrait of the Emperor Justinian, possibly wearing tzangia

The tzangion (Ancient Greek: τζαγγίον, pronounced [tsaŋˈgion]), plural tzangia (τζαγγία) was a type of boot or sandal, which in the Middle Ages became an important part of the Byzantine Emperors' regalia.

In the 4th century, the tzange was a type of elegant shoe, but its use as an imperial vestment in Byzantium only began later, and was influenced by eastern, most likely, Persian, usage. Thus the first occurrence of the tzangia as a sign of royal power is in John Malalas' description of the coronation of Tzath I as king of Lazica under Justin I, where Tzath was dressed in Roman imperial garb, but wore tzangia, decorated with pearls "in the Persian manner", rather than the Roman emperor's kothornoi. By the 9th century, the wearing of red tzangia had become firmly associated with the imperial office, so much so that rebels putting them on signified their usurpation of the imperial title. In the mid-14th century, Pseudo-Kodinos reports that the tzangia were tall boots decorated with eagles out of pearls and precious stones.

The term is the root for the Greek term for shoemaker, tsangaris (τσαγκάρης), via tzangarios (τζαγγάριος), although a maker of imperial tzangia was called tzangas (τζαγγάς).

== See also ==
- List of shoe styles

== Sources ==
- Kazhdan, Alexander (1991). "Tzangion". In Kazhdan, Alexander (ed.). The Oxford Dictionary of Byzantium. Oxford and New York: Oxford University Press. p. 2135. ISBN 978-0-19-504652-6.
