= Tablion =

Clothing accessory of high dignitaries in ancient times and the Byzantine Empire

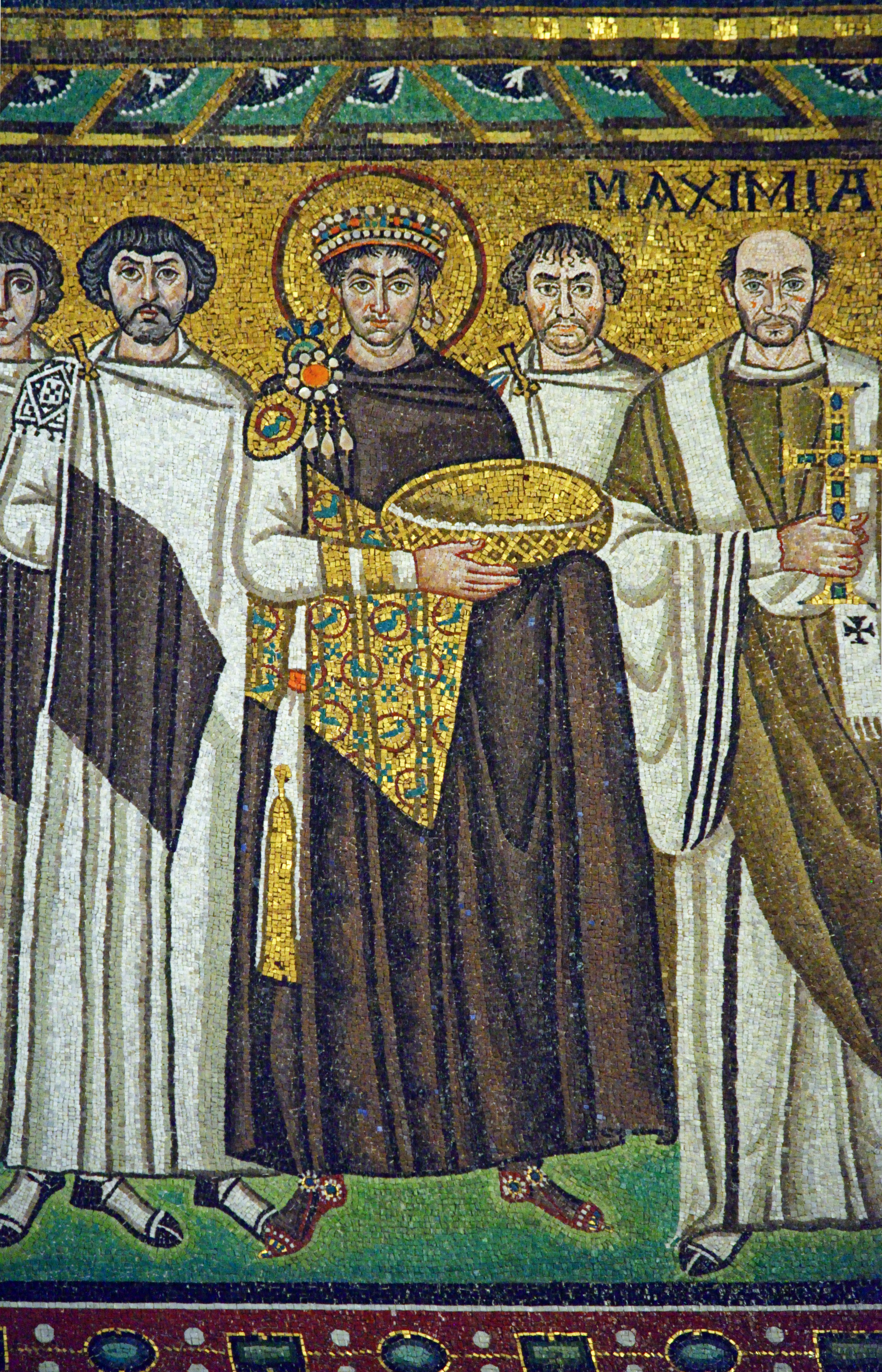
Emperor Justinian I and his court, showing the golden tablion of the emperor and the purple tablion of the senior courtiers. Mosaic from the Basilica of San Vitale, Ravenna.

The tablion (Greek: ταβλίον) was a rectangular or trapezoidal panel embroidered on the ceremonial mantle (chlamys) of courtiers during the Byzantine Empire. The tablia were chosen to contrast with the mantle colour, and sewn pairwise on the front edges of the mantle. They could be further decorated with embroidered designs or images of the emperor. The emperor's mantle originally (in the 4th century) featured tablia sewn almost at the bottom of the mantle, below the knees, but from the 6th century they were moved to the centre of the mantle opening. As the chlamys was the chief civilian court dress, the tablion was a part of male court costume, and had to be purchased by the office-holders (for example, a patrikios paid 24 gold solidi in the 9th century). The only women allowed to wear a chlamys and tablion were the empresses. In the middle Byzantine period, the chlamys is much more richly decorated, but is sometimes depicted without tablia. The exact significance of this is unclear, although it has been suggested that it might denote lower court ranks.

In art, the chlamys is usually depicted with the right half thrown behind the shoulder, so that only the left-hand tablion is visible. Although normally a symbol of civilian dress, military saints are often depicted wearing a chlamys with tablia.

In the Kletorologion of 899, the term tablion is also used for a box for the emperor's personal garments, carried by his servants during processions.

== See also ==
- Mandarin square
- Tiraz

== Sources ==
- Parani, Maria G. (2003). Reconstructing the Reality of Images: Byzantine Material Culture and Religious Iconography (11th to 15th Centuries). Leiden, South Holland: Brill. ISBN 978-90-04-12462-2.
- Ševčenko, Nancy Patterson (1991). "Tablion". In Kazhdan, Alexander (ed.). The Oxford Dictionary of Byzantium. Oxford and New York: Oxford University Press. p. 2004. ISBN 0-19-504652-8.
