= David Plates =

Set of Byzantine silver plates

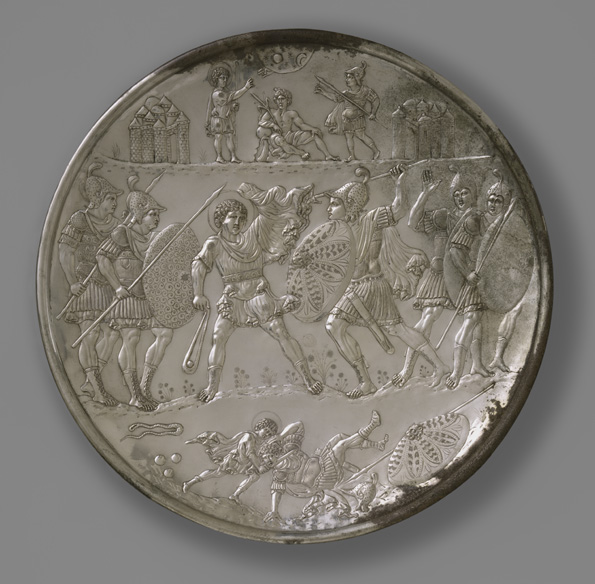
David battles Goliath, the largest plate.

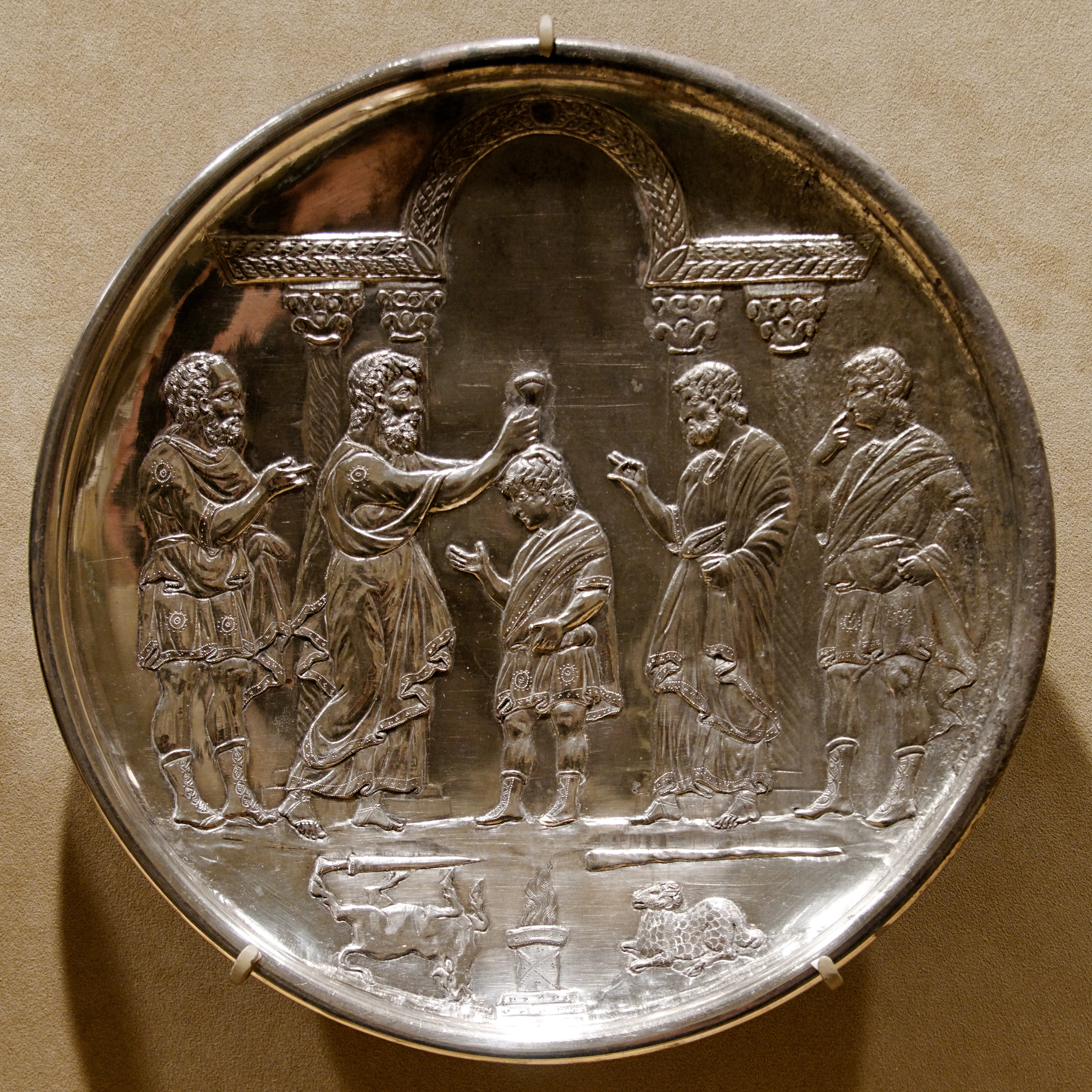
Samuel anointing David, medium size

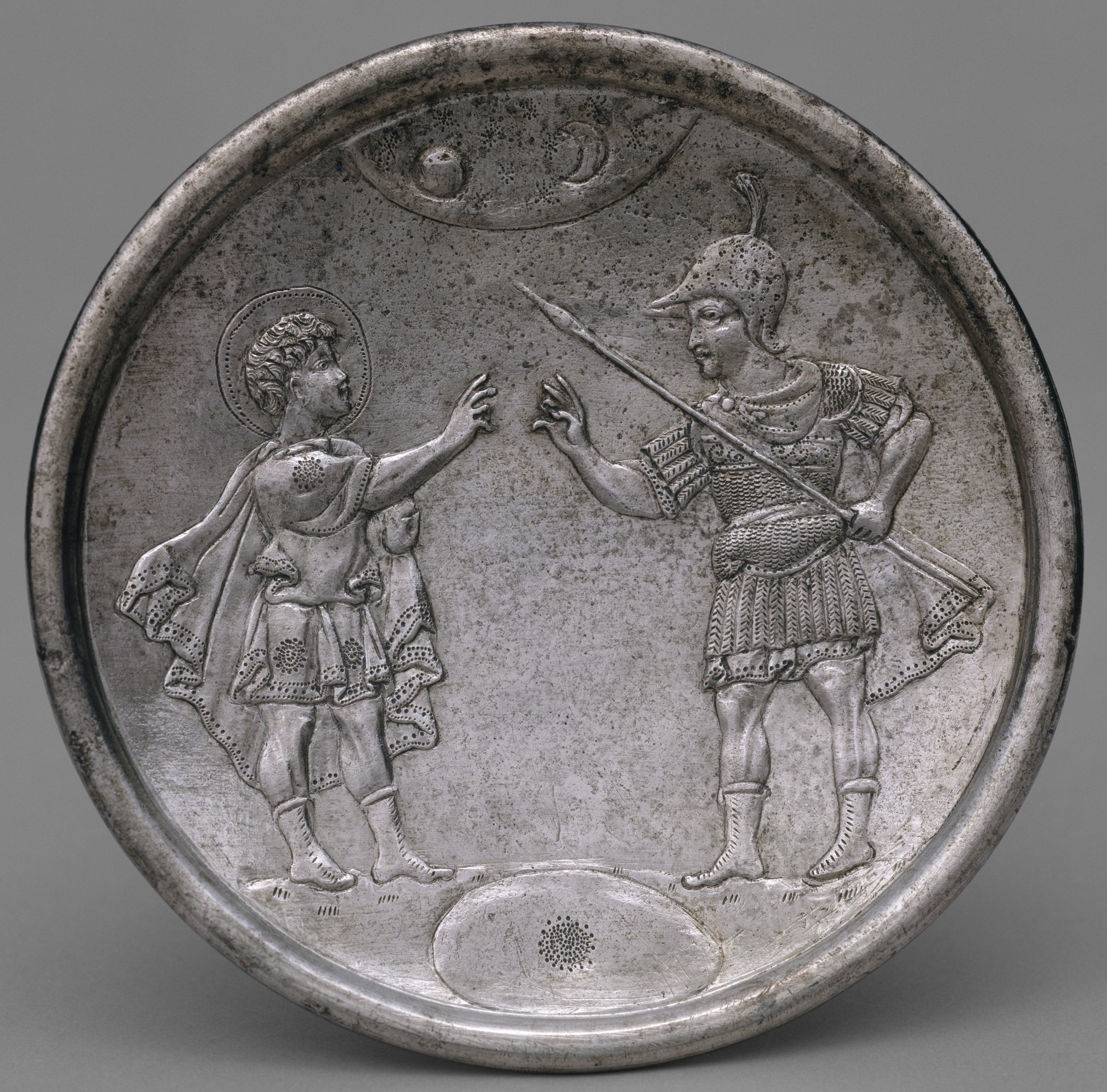
David's Confrontation with Eliab, a small plate

The David Plates (or Cyprus Plates) are a set of nine silver plates, in three sizes, stamped between 613 and 630. The plates were created in Constantinople, each depicting a scene from the life of the Hebrew king David, and associated with the reign of Emperor Heraclius (610-641). Following their discovery in Karavas (northern Cyprus) in 1902, the David Plates have been considered key additions to early Byzantine secular art.

Casual laborers from the village of Karavas found the David Plates with other silver as they were quarrying the ruins for construction stones. The whole hoard is sometimes known as the "Second Cyprus Treasure", the "First Cyprus Treasure" being what is now usually called the Lambousa Treasure (mostly religious plate, now in the British Museum). The finders, however, failed to report what they had discovered to the Cypriot authorities. When authorities learned of their taking they confiscated three of the David Plates, displayed now in the Limassol Castle, alongside a pair of cross-monogram plates, and other jewelry held today in the Cyprus Museum in Nicosia. The rest of the discovery was smuggled from Cyprus and traded to a dealer located in Paris. Most of this hoard was bought by J. Pierpont Morgan and was later given to the Metropolitan Museum of Art in New York City by his heirs in 1917, where they currently remain.

== Plates ==
=== Large, Center Plate ===
- David battles Goliath. Size and weight: 19 7/16 x 2 5/8 in., 203.9oz. (49.4 x 6.6 cm, 5780g)

=== Medium plates ===
- Samuel anoints David in the presence of his father and brothers
- David is Introduced to Saul
- Saul Arms David
- Marriage of David and Michal

=== Smaller plates ===
- David fights lion
- David fights bear
- David approached by messenger while playing the harp
- David's Confrontation with Eliab

== Manufacture ==
The David Plates are of extremely high quality, pointing the source of production to the palace workshops in Constantinople that was known for the manufacture of specific luxury commodities. The plates have control stamps by the Byzantine emperor Heraclius to assure the quality of silver used to make them. The nine silver plates were made in three sizes; one large plate, four medium plates and another four small plates. Regarding the form, the plates are similar, with rolled rims, concave surfaces, and a high foot ring.

== Commission ==
The stamps offer an intriguing aspect of relating the David Plates to Heraclius’ rule. It is often thought that the set could have been commissioned to celebrate the defeat of the Sasanian Empire (628-629) by Heraclius. He managed to end a long war with Persia and retook control over Egypt, Syria, and other Byzantine regions. Specifically, Heraclius regained the Byzantine territories that included Jerusalem (founded by King David) and the Sasanian city of Ctesiphon. The Byzantine-Sasanian War echoed David's victory over Goliath as he also beheaded his enemy, giving him the acclaim of being the new David. The emperor's image as the new David par excellence might have been praised to celebrate past achievement as well as promote confidence in the present and future. The last years on the control stamps, therefore, are seen as the most likely for the development of David Plates. It is thought that Heraclius ordered the commission of the David Plates for their intrinsic value. More aspects are still being studied to point out their true reality in Byzantine art history.
