= Marsden (surname) =

Marsden is an English surname. Notable people with the surname include:

== People ==
=== Performers ===
- Bernie Marsden (1951–2023), English rock guitarist
- Betty Marsden (1919–1998), British comedy actress
- Gerry Marsden (1942–2021), British musician
- James Marsden (born 1973), American actor
- Jason Marsden (born 1975), American screen and voice actor
- Matthew Marsden, (born 1973), English actor
- Midge Marsden, (born 1945), New Zealand musician
- Roy Marsden (born 1941), British actor who played detective Dalgliesh on television

=== Politicians ===
- David W. Marsden (born 1948), American politician
- Frank Marsden (1923–2006), British politician
- Gordon Marsden (born 1953), British politician
- Henry Rowland Marsden (1823–1876), mayor of Leeds and philanthropist
- Lorna Marsden, (born 1942), Canadian sociologist and senator

=== Other ===
- Alexander Edwin Marsden, English surgeon and cancer specialist
- Alison Marsden, American bioengineer
- Brian G. Marsden (1937–2010), British astronomer
- Chris Marsden (born 1969), football player
- David Marsden, Canadian radio broadcaster
- Dora Marsden (1882–1960), author
- Edgar Marsden (1919–2010), Trinidad cricketer
- Edward Marsden (1869–1932), Canadian-American missionary
- Eric William Marsden (1926–1975), British historian of classical antiquity
- Ernest Marsden (1889–1970), British-New Zealand physicist
- George Marsden (born 1939), American historian
- Jerrold E. Marsden (1942–2010), mathematician
- Jill Marsden (scholar) (born 1964), philosopher
- Joan Marsden (1922–2001), Canadian zoologist
- John Howard Marsden (1803–1870), English antiquary and vicar
- John Marsden (footballer) (born 1992), English footballer
- John Marsden (lawyer) (1942–2006), Australian solicitor
- John Marsden (rower) (1915–2004), English rower, intelligence officer and teacher
- John Marsden (rugby league) (born 1953), English rugby player
- John Marsden (writer) (1950–2024), Australian writer of books for children and young adults
- Jonathan Marsden (art historian), English art historian, curator and courtier
- Jonathan Marsden (cricketer), English former first-class cricketer
- Karen Marsden (born 1962), Australian field hockey player
- Laurie Marsden, American model, therapist, writer and activist
- Pat Marsden (1936–2006), Canadian sportscaster
- Paul Marsden (born 1968), British politician
- Philip Marsden (born 1961), British author
- Rachel Marsden (born 1974), Canadian political commentator and activist
- Rhodri Marsden (born 1971), London-based journalist, musician, and blogger
- Samuel Marsden (1764–1838), Anglican priest
- Samuel Marsden (bishop) (1832–1912), Anglican bishop
- Simon Marsden (1948–2012), English photographer
- Victor E. Marsden (1866–1920), journalist and translator of The Protocols of the Elders of Zion
- William Marsden (footballer, born 1871) (1871–1943), English footballer
- William Marsden (orientalist) (1754–1836), English orientalist
- William Marsden (surgeon) (1796–1867), English surgeon

== Fictional characters ==
- Elaine Marsden, fictional character (Emmerdale)
- Frances Marsden, fictional character (Emmerdale)
- Jill Marsden (EastEnders), fictional character
- Paul Marsden (Emmerdale), fictional character
- Ronnie Marsden, fictional character (Emmerdale)
- Siobhan Marsden, fictional character (Emmerdale)
