= Marsden =

Marsden may refer to:

== Places ==
=== Australia ===
- Marsden, Queensland, a suburb in Logan City
- Point Marsden, South Australia

=== Canada ===
- Marsden, Saskatchewan

=== New Zealand ===
- Marsden (New Zealand electorate)
- Marsden Point
- Marsden Bay, New Zealand
- Marsden statistical area, corresponding to Wharemoa, Greymouth

=== United Kingdom ===
- Marsden, Tyne and Wear
- Marsden, West Yorkshire

=== United States ===
- Marsden Mounds an archaeological site in Louisiana, USA

== Other uses ==
- Marsden (surname)
- Marsden motion, a legal motion to replace an incompetent attorney
- Marsden High School, in New South Wales, Australia
- Marsden State High School, in Queensland, Australia
- Samuel Marsden Collegiate School in Wellington, New Zealand
- Marsden Rattler, otherwise known as the South Shields, Marsden, and Whitburn Colliery Railway

== See also ==
- Marden (disambiguation)
- Madsen (disambiguation)
