= Marden =

Marden may refer to:

== Places ==
=== Australia ===
- Marden, South Australia, a suburb of Adelaide

=== England ===
- Marden, Herefordshire
- Marden, Kent
  - Marden Airfield
  - Marden railway station
- Marden, Tyne and Wear
- Marden, West Sussex
  - East Marden
  - North Marden
- Marden, Wiltshire
  - Marden Henge
- Up Marden, Compton, West Sussex
- Marden Park, Surrey

== Other uses ==
- Marden (surname)
- Marden's theorem, in complex geometry
- River Marden, Wiltshire, England

== See also ==
- Marsden (disambiguation)
- Madsen (disambiguation)
