= Mardon =

Mardon is a surname. Notable people with the surname include:

- Austin Mardon
- Ernest George Mardon
- Geoff Mardon
- Paul Mardon

== Fictional characters ==
- Mark Mardon, the real name of Weather Wizard
- Clyde Mardon, the brother of Mark

== See also ==
- Marden
