= The Beguiling of Merlin =

Painting by Edward Burne-Jones

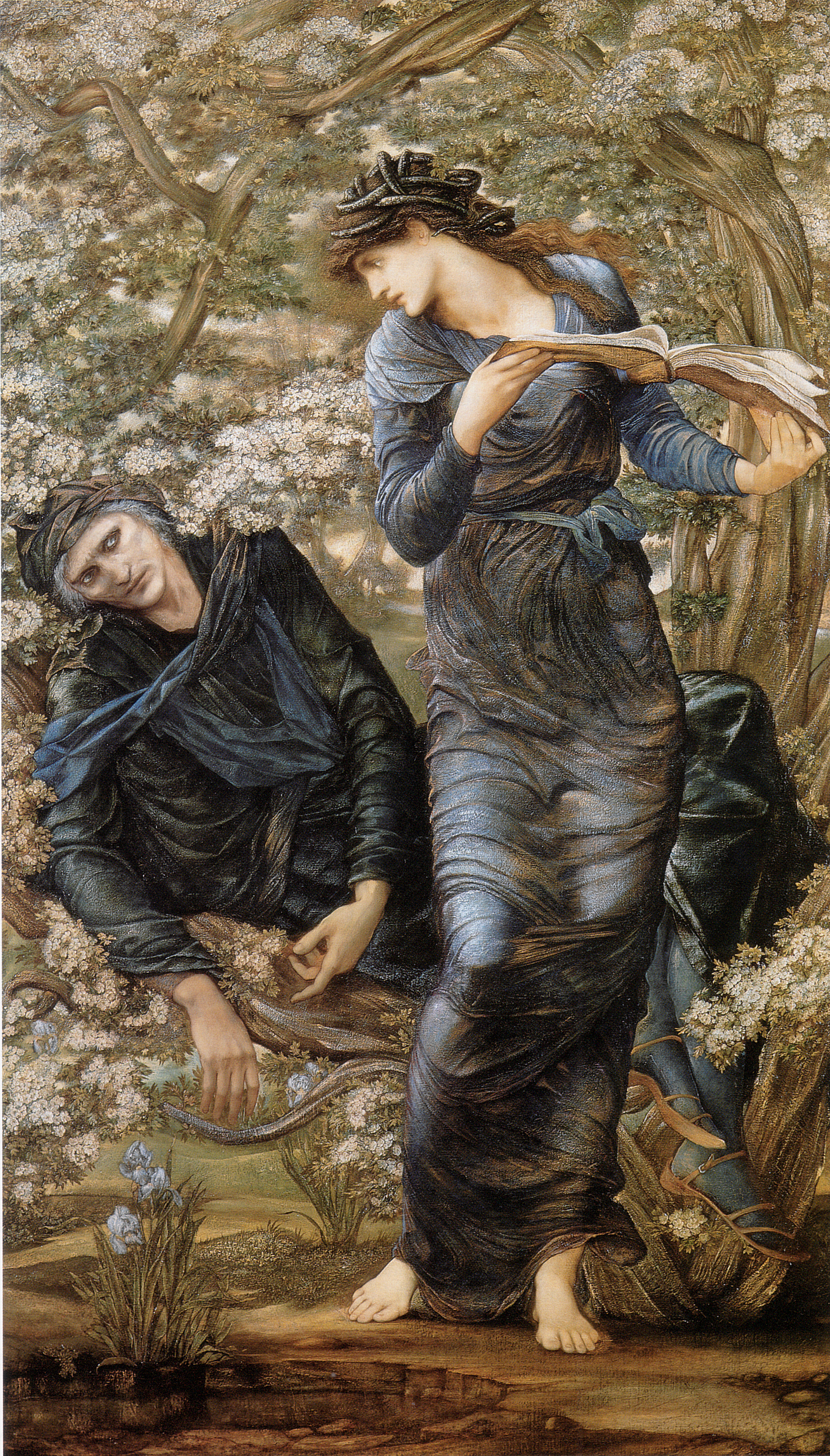
- Artist: Edward Burne-Jones
- Year: 1872–1877
- Medium: Oil on canvas
- Dimensions: 186 cm × 111 cm (73 in × 44 in)
- Location: Lady Lever Art Gallery, Port Sunlight, Merseyside

The Beguiling of Merlin is a painting by the British Pre-Raphaelite painter Edward Burne-Jones that was created between 1872 and 1877.

The painting depicts a scene from the Arthurian legend about the infatuation of Merlin with the Lady of the Lake, Nimue. Merlin is shown trapped, helpless in a hawthorn bush as Nimue reads from a book of spells.

The work was commissioned from Burne-Jones by Frederick Richards Leyland, a Liverpool ship-owner and art-collector, in the late 1860s. After a false start blamed on "poor materials", Burne-Jones began work on the painting proper in 1873, finishing the body of the work by the end of 1874; however, the painting was not first exhibited until 1877 at the opening exhibition of the Grosvenor Gallery in London.

Burne-Jones used Maria Zambaco, who was probably his mistress from 1866 to 1872, for the model for the head of Nimue.

The Beguiling of Merlin was purchased by Lord Leverhulme in 1918 and remains in the Lady Lever Art Gallery to the present day.

The painting features on the covers of the books Possession: A Romance (1990), by A. S. Byatt, and Fiona MacCarthy's biography of Burne-Jones, The Last Pre-Raphaelite (2011).

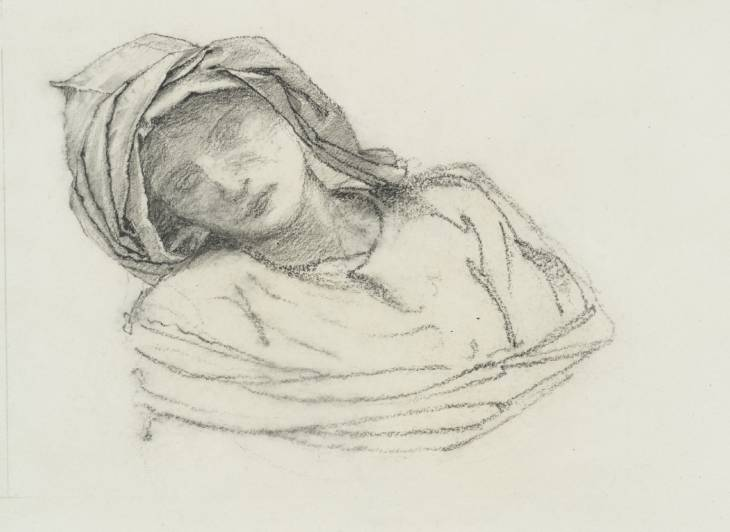
Study of the head of Merlin

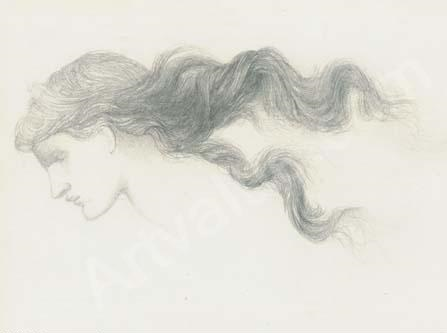
Study of the head of Nimue

== See also ==
- List of paintings by Edward Burne-Jones
