= West Norwood Cemetery =

Cemetery in West Norwood in London, England

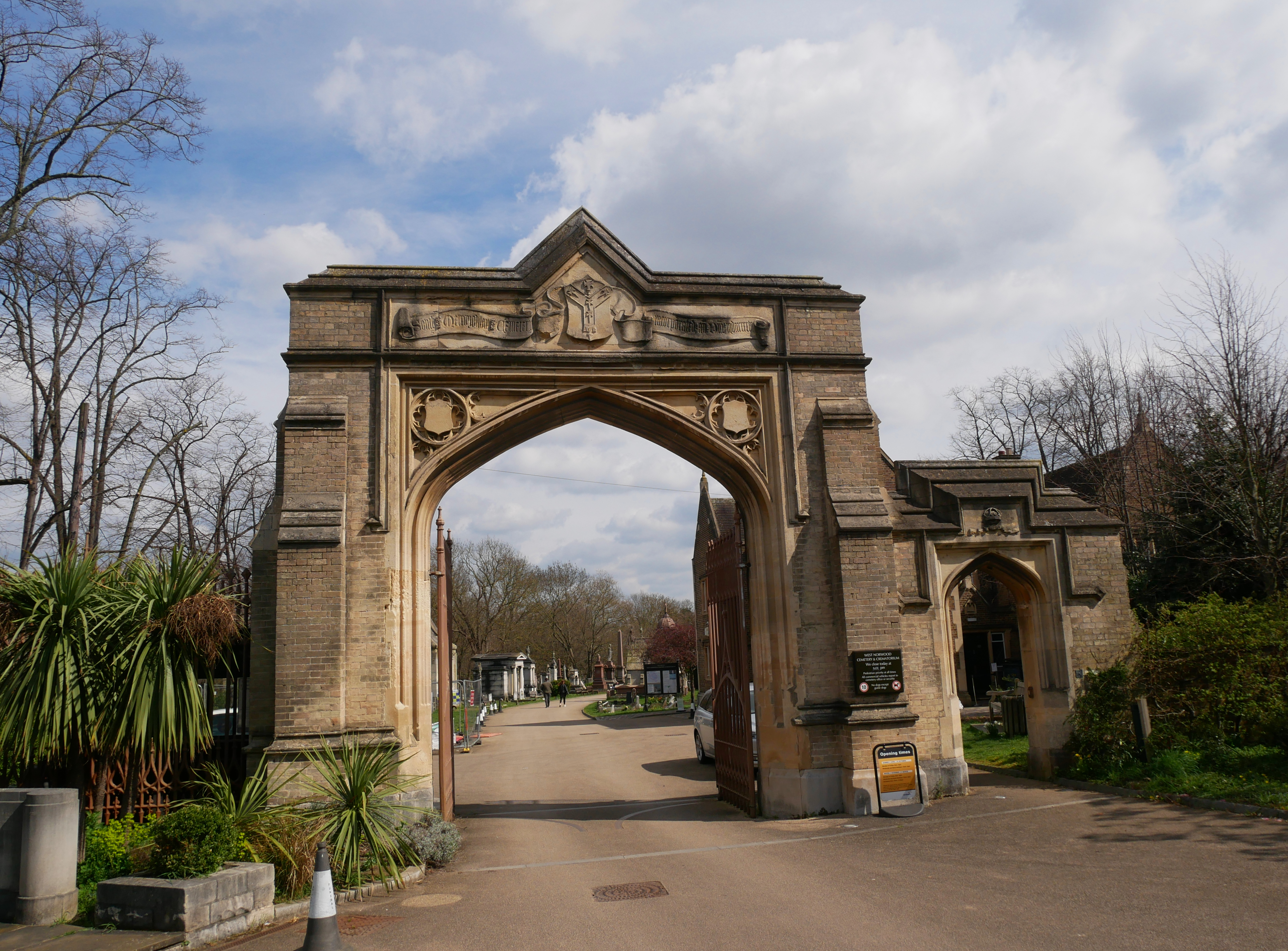
- Gothic inner gates to the cemetery, designed by Sir William Tite
- Interactive map of West Norwood Cemetery

Details
- Established: 1837
- Location: Norwood Road, West Norwood, London, SE27 9JU
- Country: England
- Coordinates: 51.4330°N 0.0986°W
- Type: Public
- Owned by: Lambeth London Borough Council
- Size: 16 hectares (40 acres)
- No. of graves: 42,000+
- No. of interments: around 200,000
- Website: Official website

Listed Building – Grade II*
- Official name: West Norwood Cemetery & Crematorium
- Designated: 1 October 1987
- Reference no.: 1000851

National Register of Historic Parks and Gardens
- Official name: West Norwood Cemetery & Crematorium
- Designated: 1 October 1987
- Reference no.: 1000851

West Norwood Cemetery is a 40-acre (16 ha) rural cemetery in West Norwood in London, England. It was also known as the South Metropolitan Cemetery. One of the first private landscaped cemeteries in London, it is one of the "Magnificent Seven" cemeteries of London, and is a site of major historical, architectural and ecological interest.

Its grounds are a mixture of historic monumental cemetery and modern lawn cemetery, but it also has catacombs, cremation plots and a columbarium for cinerary ashes. The cemetery's crematorium still operates, but all the conventional and cremated remains burial plots have been allocated and hence it is closed to new burials pending further agreement under current burial legislation.

== Location ==
The Main gate is located on Norwood Road near the junction with Robson Road, where Norwood Road forks into Norwood High Street and Knights' Hill. It is in the London Borough of Lambeth (SE27). The local authority is the current owner. The site, with some of its neighbouring streets, forms part of a conservation area.

== Site ==
Believed by some to hold the finest collection of sepulchral monuments in London, the cemetery features 69 Grade II and Grade II* listed buildings and structures, including a dedicated Greek Orthodox necropolis with 19 listed mausoleums and monuments. It is one of the Magnificent Seven metropolitan lawn cemeteries of the Victorian era, and its extensive Gothic Revival architecture qualifies it as one of the significant cemeteries in Europe.

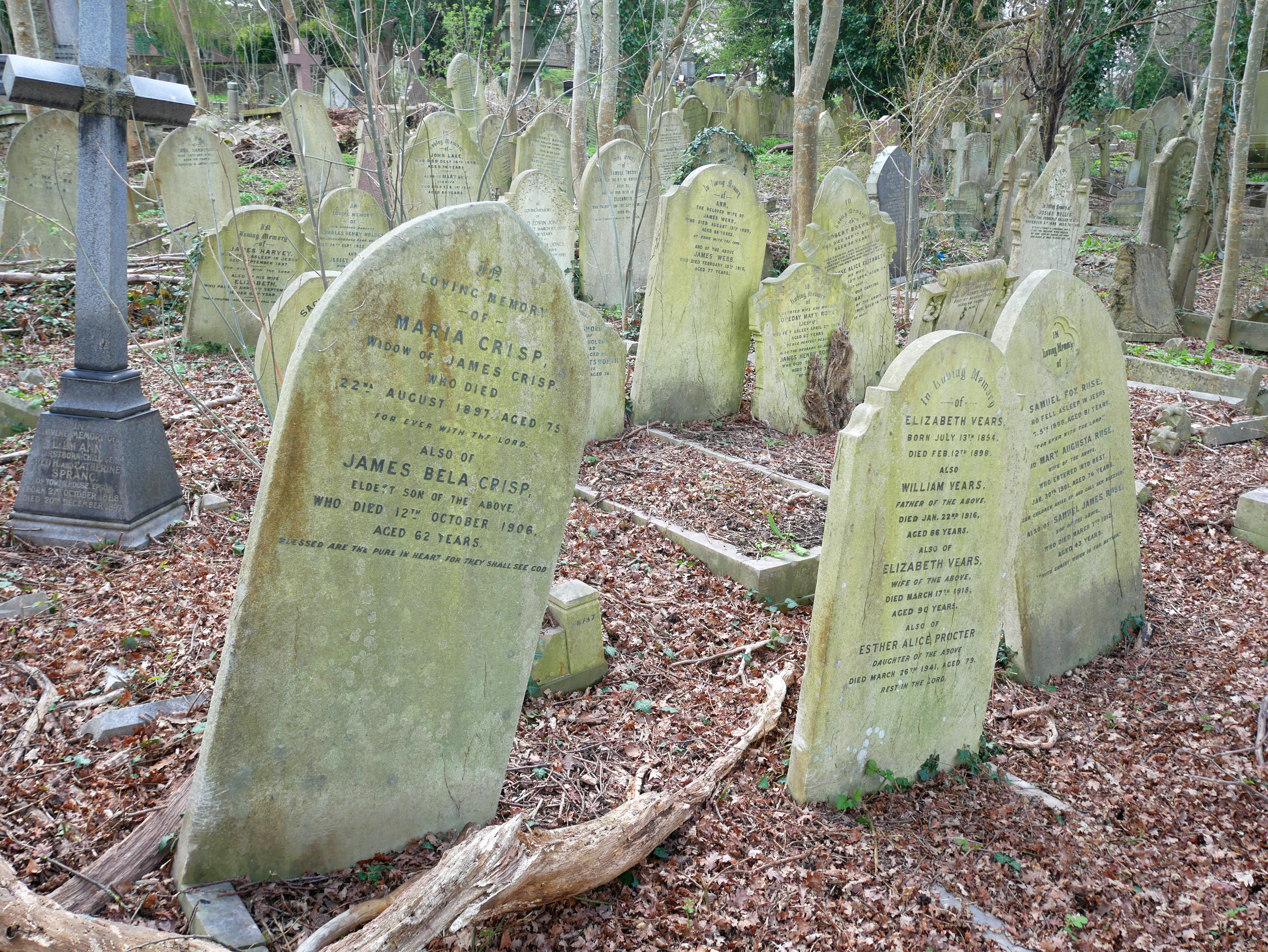
A selection of headstones in the northern part of the cemetery

Lambeth Council have recognised it as a site of nature conservation value within the Borough in addition to its outstanding value as a site of national historic and cultural interest. English Heritage have placed it on the National Register of Historic Parks and Gardens, describing it as the first cemetery to be designed in the Gothic Revival style. The entrance gate is set within railings, painted a historically accurate 'spice' brown. Railings and walls were kept high to dispel fears of body snatchers. There is a second entrance nearby, normally kept locked, in Norwood High Street which is close to West Norwood railway station.

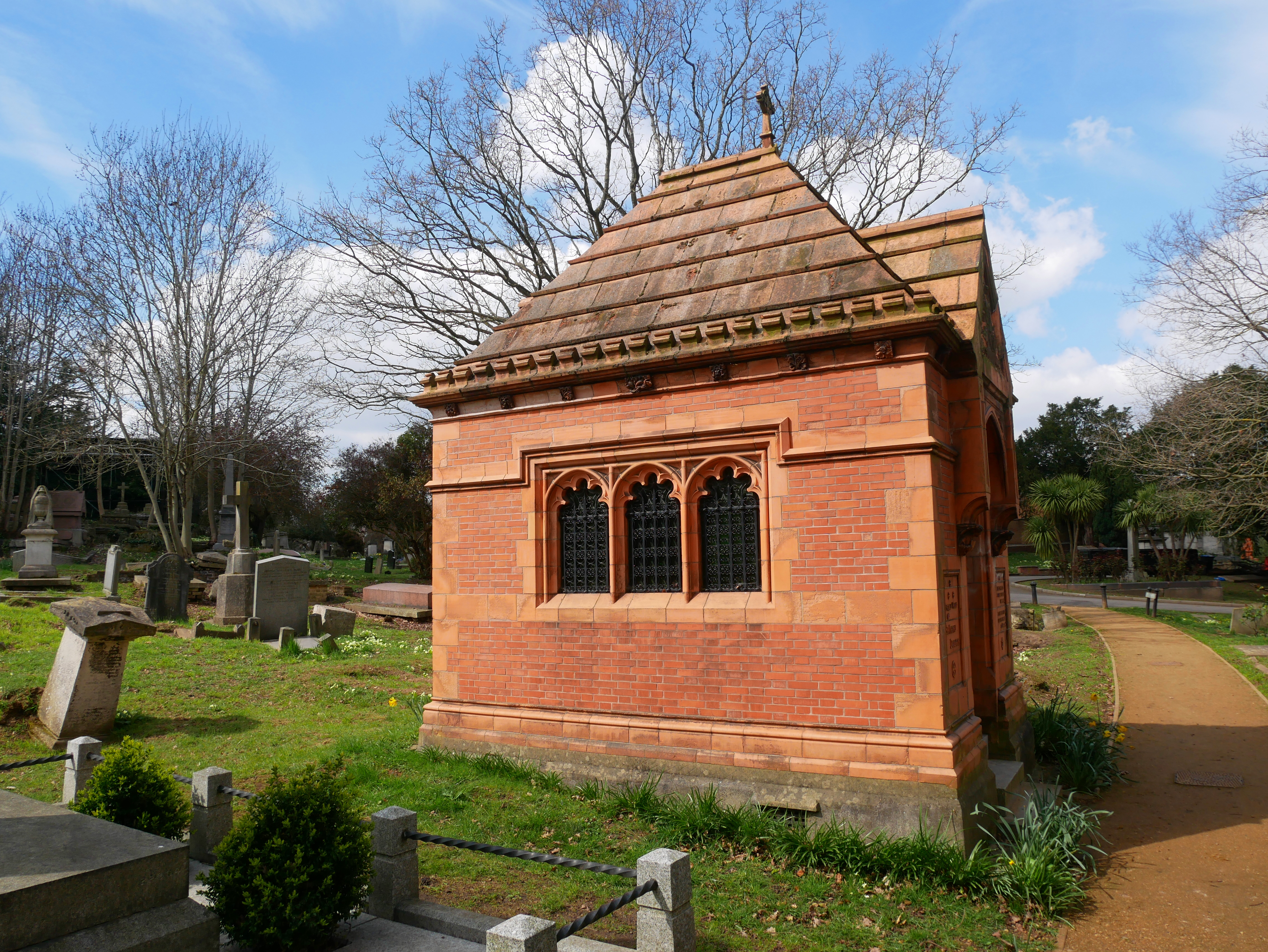
Sir Henry Doulton's mausoleum, a Grade II listed structure

It is a mixture of cleared, manicured, and mature landscaping, and includes Anglican and unconsecrated burial grounds, a crematorium, memorial gardens, columbarium, recordia, chapel, vaults and catacombs on top of a gently rolling hill, with views across south London. The larger plots on the central higher ground and by the main drives were originally sold as prime locations and are the site of some of the grander Anglican monuments and mausolea, while the Greek Orthodox necropolis in the North East contains a high density of neoclassical architecture.

Many of these mausolea are listed, such as the Grade II mausoleum for Sir Henry Doulton's family, constructed appropriately of pottery and terracotta. As a contrast, just a few yards to the west of the crematorium is the very simple headstone to Isabella Mary Mayson Beeton, aka Mrs Beeton, the Victorian cookery writer.

== History ==
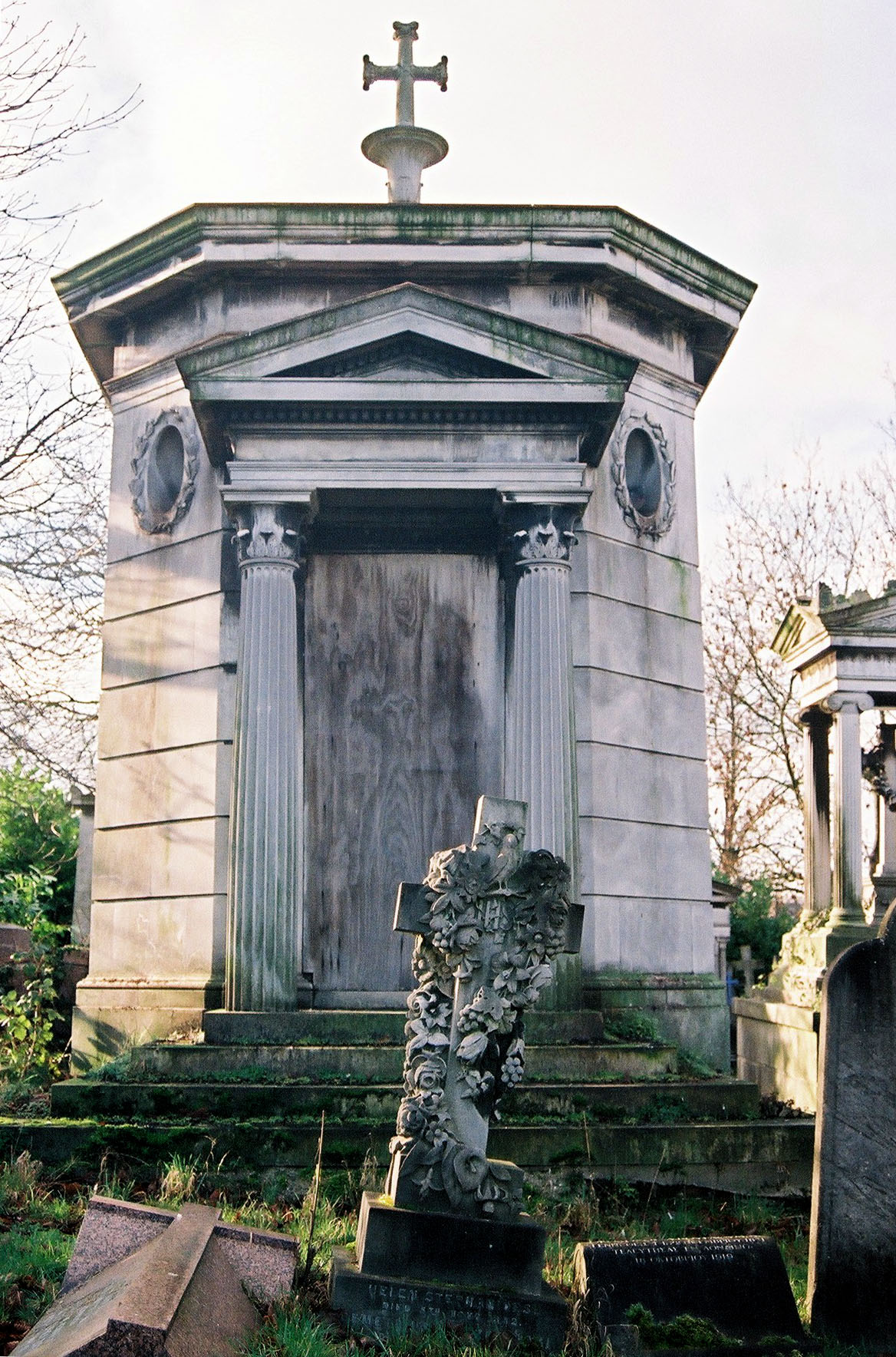
Vagliano's mausoleum in the Greek necropolis within West Norwood Cemetery

The cemetery was founded by its own act of Parliament of 1836 and consecrated for its first burials in 1837. By 2000, there had been 164,000 burials in 42,000 plots, plus 34,000 cremations and several thousand interments in its catacombs (see also Catacombs of London).

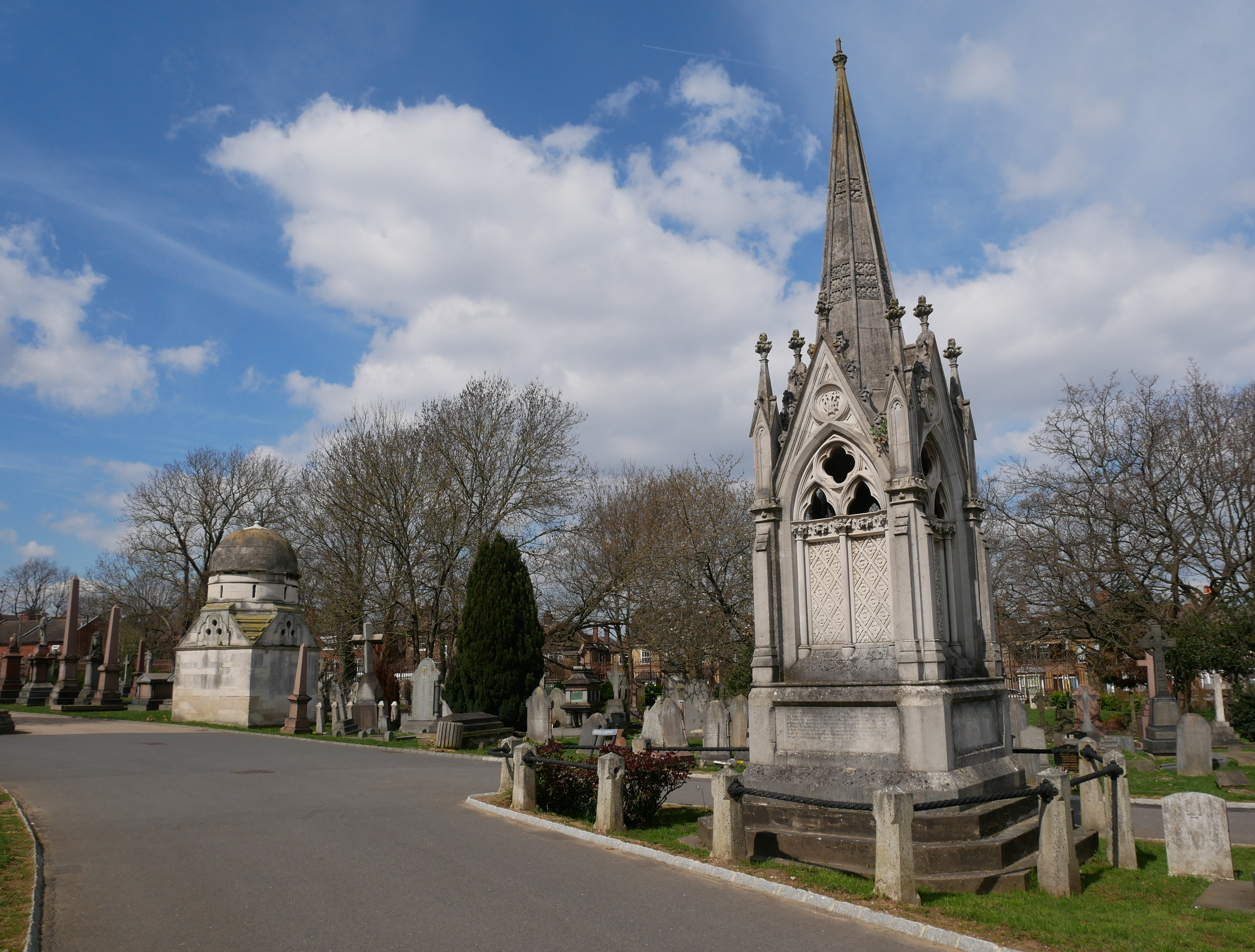
The tomb of James Gilbart, a Grade II listed structure in the cemetery

As early as 1711, Sir Christopher Wren advocated the creation of burial grounds on the outskirts of town, "inclosed with a strong Brick Wall, and having a walk round, and two cross walks, decently planted with Yew-trees." In 1830, George Frederick Carden, editor of The Penny Magazine, successfully petitioned Parliament about the parlous state of London's over-full church burial yards. Over time they passed a number of laws that effectively halted burials in London's churchyards, moving them 'to places where they would be less prejudicial to the health of the inhabitants'. In 1836, a specific Parliamentary statute enabled the South Metropolitan Cemetery Company to purchase land from the estate of the late Lord Thurlow in what was then called Lower Norwood and create the second of the 'Magnificent Seven' cemeteries.

The new cemetery was consecrated by the Bishop of Winchester on 7 December 1837, receiving its first burial soon after. Until 1877, the consecrated grounds were overseen by the Diocese of Winchester, and then Rochester, before coming under the authority of Southwark from 1905.

Architect William Tite was a director of the cemetery company and designed the landscaping, some monuments, and was eventually interred there himself. This was the first cemetery in the UK to be designed in the new Gothic style. It offered a rural setting in open countryside, as it lay outside London at that time. Its design and location attracted the attention of wealthy – and aspirational – Victorians, who commissioned many fine mausoleums and memorials for their burial plots and vaults.

The site of the cemetery was part of the ancient Great North Wood, from which Norwood took its name. Although many trees had been cleared, a number of mature specimens were included in Tite's original landscaping. A tree survey of the cemetery in 2005 identified one oak which is thought to date from 1540 to 1640. Fourteen more oaks, a maple and an ash tree were identified that predate the foundation of the cemetery in 1836. In the first years of the cemetery's operation, these were joined by coniferous trees and evergreen holm oaks.

=== Enclosures ===
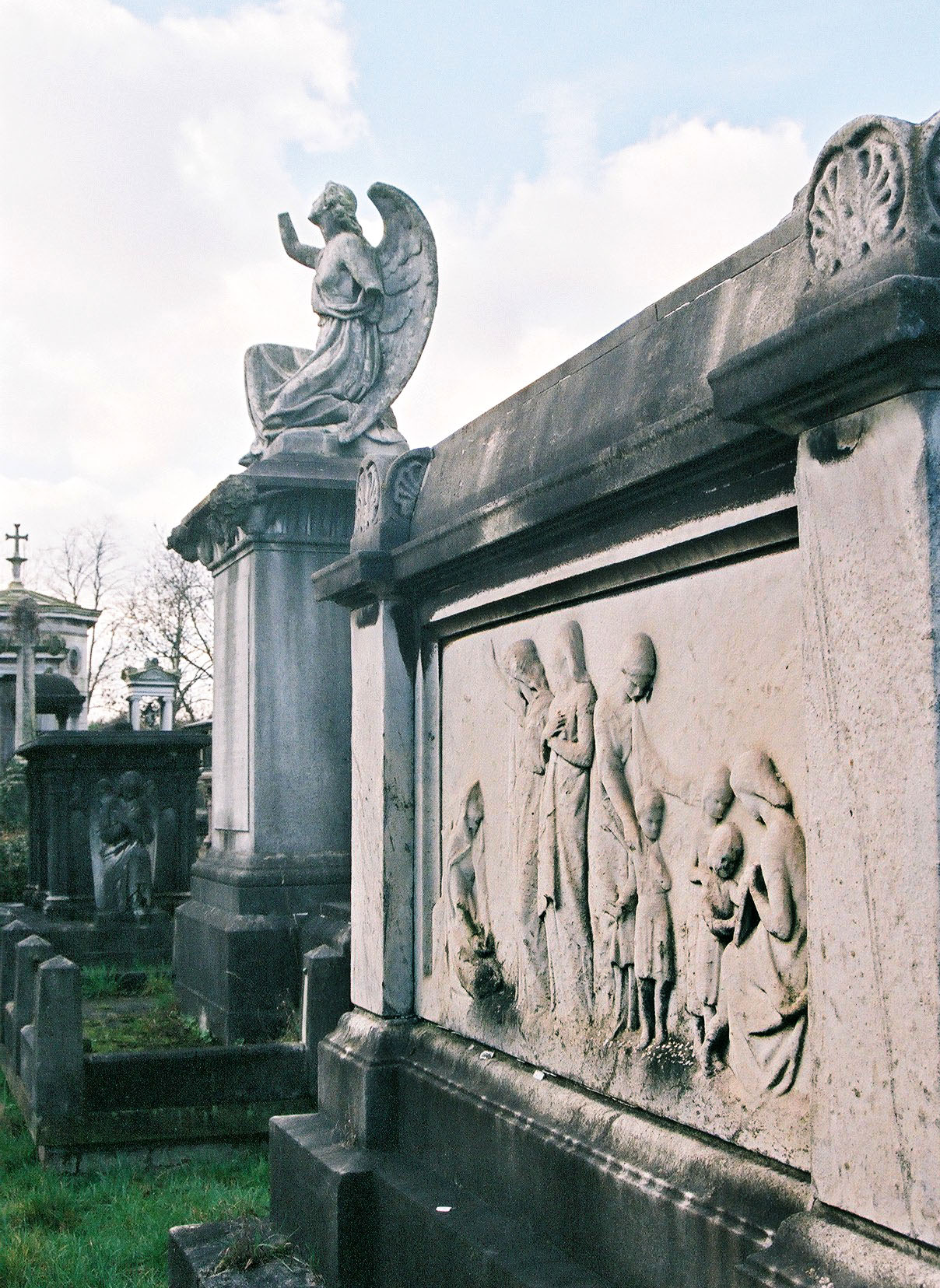
Graves and memorials in the cemetery. The tomb holding Maria Zambaco is in the foreground.

In 1842, a section of the cemetery was acquired by London's Greek community for a Greek Orthodox cemetery, and this soon filled with many fine monuments and large mausoleums, memorialising the history of Anglo-Hellenic families. Grade II*-listed St Stephen's Chapel within the Greek section is sometimes attributed to architect John Oldrid Scott. The Greek necropolis is overseen by the trustees of the Cathedral of Saint Sophia.

Another enclosure in the south-east corner was acquired by St Mary-at-Hill in the City of London for its own parish burials.

=== More recent history ===
The Dissenters' chapel was damaged by a V-1 flying bomb during World War II and rebuilt in 1956. In 1960 the grand Episcopal chapel was levelled, to be replaced by a memorial rose garden over its catacombs.

The main office at the front of the cemetery was also damaged by another flying bomb; it was rebuilt after the war in a style more sympathetic to its Gothic surroundings.

Between 1978 and 1993, the cemetery achieved several levels of official recognition by being included in the West Norwood Conservation Area, while the entrance arch, the fine railings by Bramah and 64 monuments were listed as Grade II and II*.

However, space for new burials had largely been exhausted by the inter-war years, and, deprived of this regular source of income, the cemetery company was unable to properly afford its upkeep or the repair of buildings damaged by wartime bombing. Lambeth Council compulsorily purchased the cemetery in 1965, and controversially extinguished past rights and claimed ownership over the existing graves. Lambeth changed some of the character of the grounds through "lawn conversion", removing at least 10,000 monuments (including some of the listed monuments) and restarted new burials, reselling existing plots for re-use. Consistory Court cases fought in the Southwark Diocese in 1995 and 1997 found this to be illegal. It brought about the cessation of new burials and forced the restoration of a handful of the damaged or removed monuments. In addition it required Lambeth to publish an index of cleared and resold plots, so that the descendants of historic owners can identify and request restitution of their family's plot.

As a consequence of the courts' findings, Lambeth now operates the cemetery in accordance with a scheme of management under the joint control of all interested parties, that includes Lambeth, the Diocese, the Friends of West Norwood Cemetery and conservation bodies such as Historic England.

=== Crematorium ===
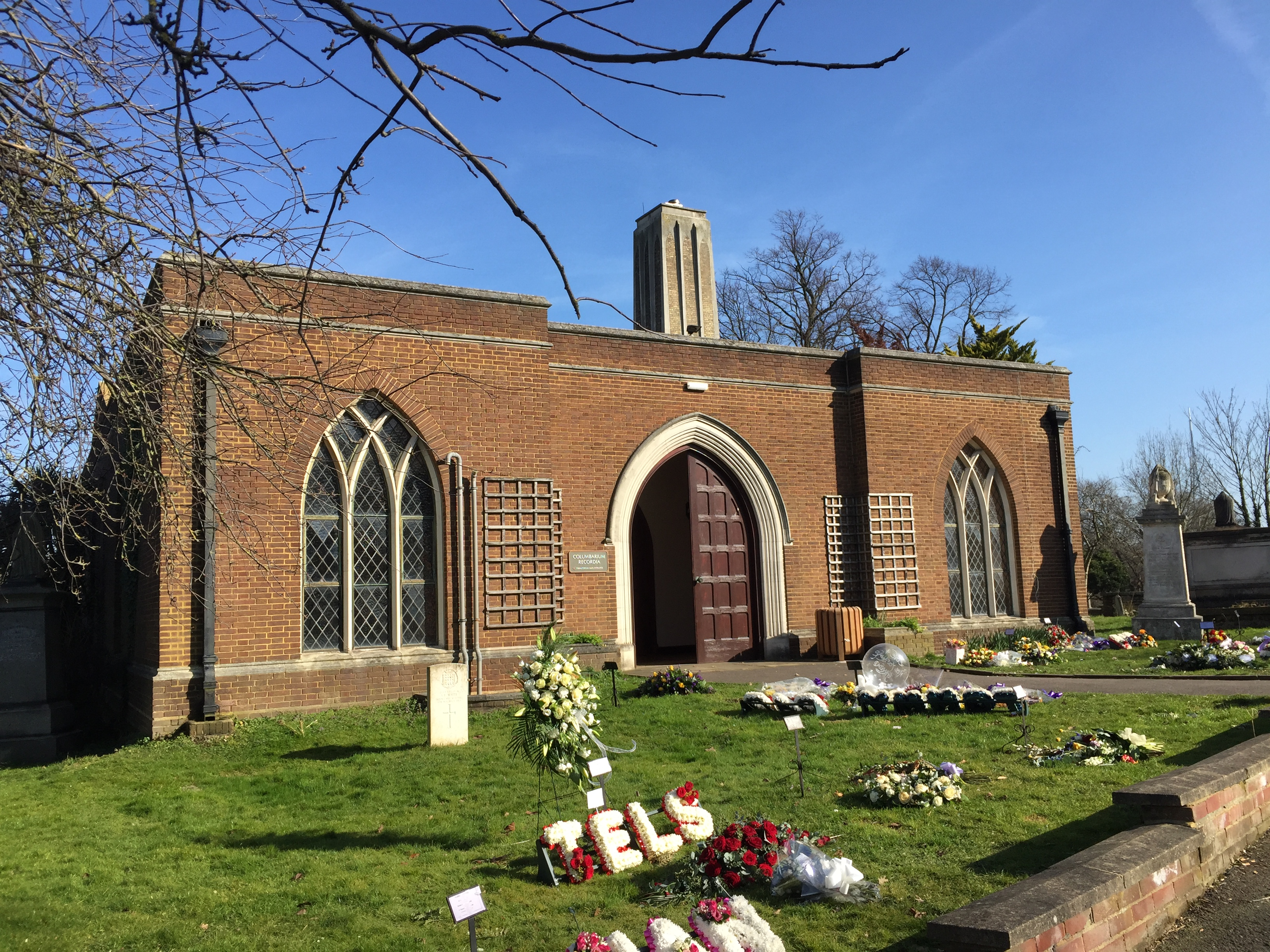
Side entrance to the crematorium

While the Anglican catacombs were a popular place for interment, those below the Dissenter's chapel remained largely empty. With the rise of the cremation movement the cemetery company identified this as a new source of revenue, and chose to rebuild part of the Dissenters' chapel in 1915 as a crematorium with access from the main hall or/and from the west. A Tousoil Fradet & Cie gas cremator was installed in the basement of the crematorium hall, with its regenerator installed in a vacant portion of the adjacent catacombs. A short length of track led from the basement of the hall into the crematorium for the use of a metal 'introducer' bier. This furnace was augmented over the next few years by two more cremators, designed by the cemetery superintendent Lockwood and the engineering company of Youngs. This equipment is located entirely underground, and used the original Bramah hydraulic lift of the catacombs to lower the coffin from the Crematorium Chapel at ground level, where a 'marshalling yard' of narrow gauge railway track allowed the bier to be moved to the correct furnace. After the war, the Dissenter's chapel was rebuilt in a more modern style as a crematorium, recordia, and columbarium over its catacombs and furnaces. Its equipment has been updated several times, and its cremators are still used on a daily basis. Lambeth Council does not allow publication of images of the crematorium chapel or cremators on any internet website including Wikipedia.

== Interments and memorials ==
A War Memorial in the form of a Cross of Sacrifice is the first memorial a visitor encounters, between the main gate and the inner gate. The Commonwealth War Graves Commission lists 136 Commonwealth war service burials of World War I and 52 of World War II, plus 18 cremations during the latter war. There is also one Belgian war burial and two Greek civilian victims of the Lusitania sinking. There are many British and Indian Army officers buried in various parts of the cemetery. Spencer John Bent, Victoria Cross recipient for action in World War I, who was cremated here, is commemorated in a garden of remembrance.

More than 200 people buried in the cemetery are recorded in the Dictionary of National Biography. The Friends of West Norwood Cemetery have recorded and compiled biographies for many more of these with:

- a large number of inventors, engineers, architects, and builders, such as Sir Hiram Maxim, inventor of the automatic machine gun, Sir Henry Bessemer, engineer and inventor of the famous steel process, James Henry Greathead who tunnelled much of the London Underground, William Burges and Sir William Tite, gothic architects
- many artists and entertainers, including: David Roberts, artist, George Stansbury, actor and acrobat George Conquest, composer and operatic singer, William Collingwood Smith, painter, Joseph Barnby, composer and resident conductor at the Royal Albert Hall, Katti Lanner, ballet dancer, Paul Cinquevalli, juggler and actors O. Smith, E. J. Lonnen, Patsy Smart, Maria Zambaco and Mary Brough
- many notable medics, such as: Dr William Marsden, founder of the Royal Free Hospital and The Royal Marsden Hospital, Dr Gideon Mantell, the geologist and pioneering palaeontologist, and Sister Eliza Roberts, Florence Nightingale's principal nurse during the Crimean War
- more than twenty Members of Parliament at Westminster including Lord Alverstone (several times Attorney General) and Lord Chattisham, some Lord Mayors of London and a few Australian settler politicians including Sir George Shenton the first Mayor of Perth
- many sportsmen, including Charles William Alcock, founder of Test cricket and the FA Cup, Georg Hackenschmidt, Anglo-Russian professional wrestler, and Harry Broome, English bare-knuckle boxing champion

There are also many notables of the time, such as Sir Henry Tate, sugar magnate and founder of London's Tate Gallery, Arthur Anderson, co-founder of P&O, Paul Julius Baron von Reuter, founder of the news agency, and the Revd. Charles Spurgeon, Baptist preacher, Isabella Beeton (the famous cookery writer), who died at 28 in childbirth, Lloyd Jones, Co-operative Society activist, to name but a few.

The Greek diaspora is well represented, including the Ralli family, Panayis Vagliano, Rodocanachi family, Michalinos Family and Princess Eugenie Palaeologue.

== Reburials and exhumations ==
In 1847 some 12,000 remains were taken from the burial vault beneath the Enon Chapel near The Strand, which, after a public health scandal, was bought by George Walker, a prominent surgeon, who had the bodies removed to Norwood Cemetery for reburial in a single mass grave.

In 1969, 11,500 remains were taken from the closed burial ground of St George's, Hanover Square in Bayswater, to West Norwood Cemetery and cremated, for burial here.

A Victoria Cross recipient from the Indian Mutiny, South Africa-born Joseph Petrus Hendrik Crowe, was originally buried here in 1876 but following the discovery of his grave in neglected condition his body was exhumed and reburied in his native town of Uitenhage in 1977.

== Gallery ==
West Norwood Cemetery is one of the Magnificent Seven. It is one of the two cemeteries located south of the river Thames (the other being Nunhead Cemetery).

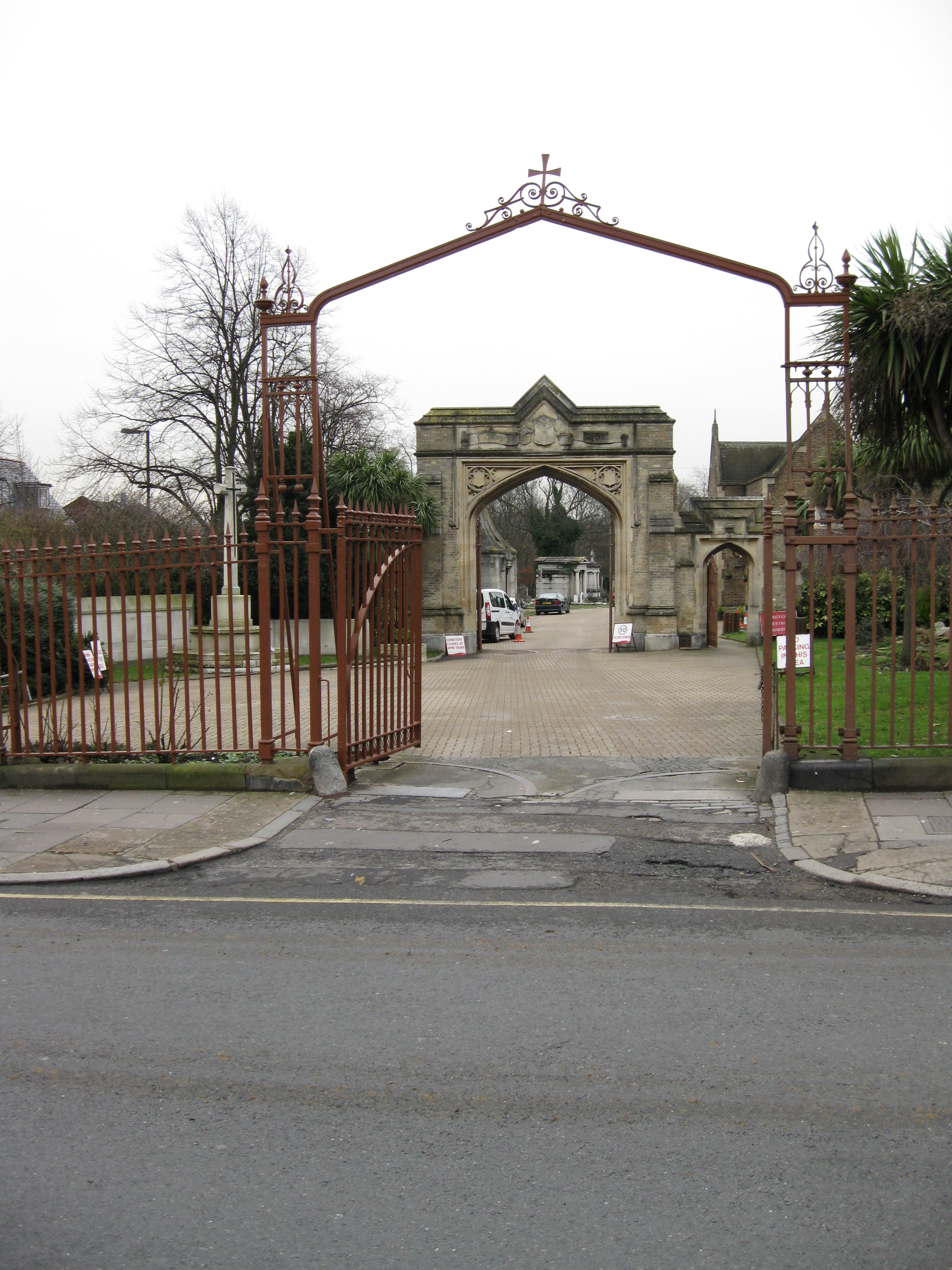
Entrance gates on Norwood Road leading to the original 1837 gates. On left is Commonwealth War Graves Commission Cross of Sacrifice memorial

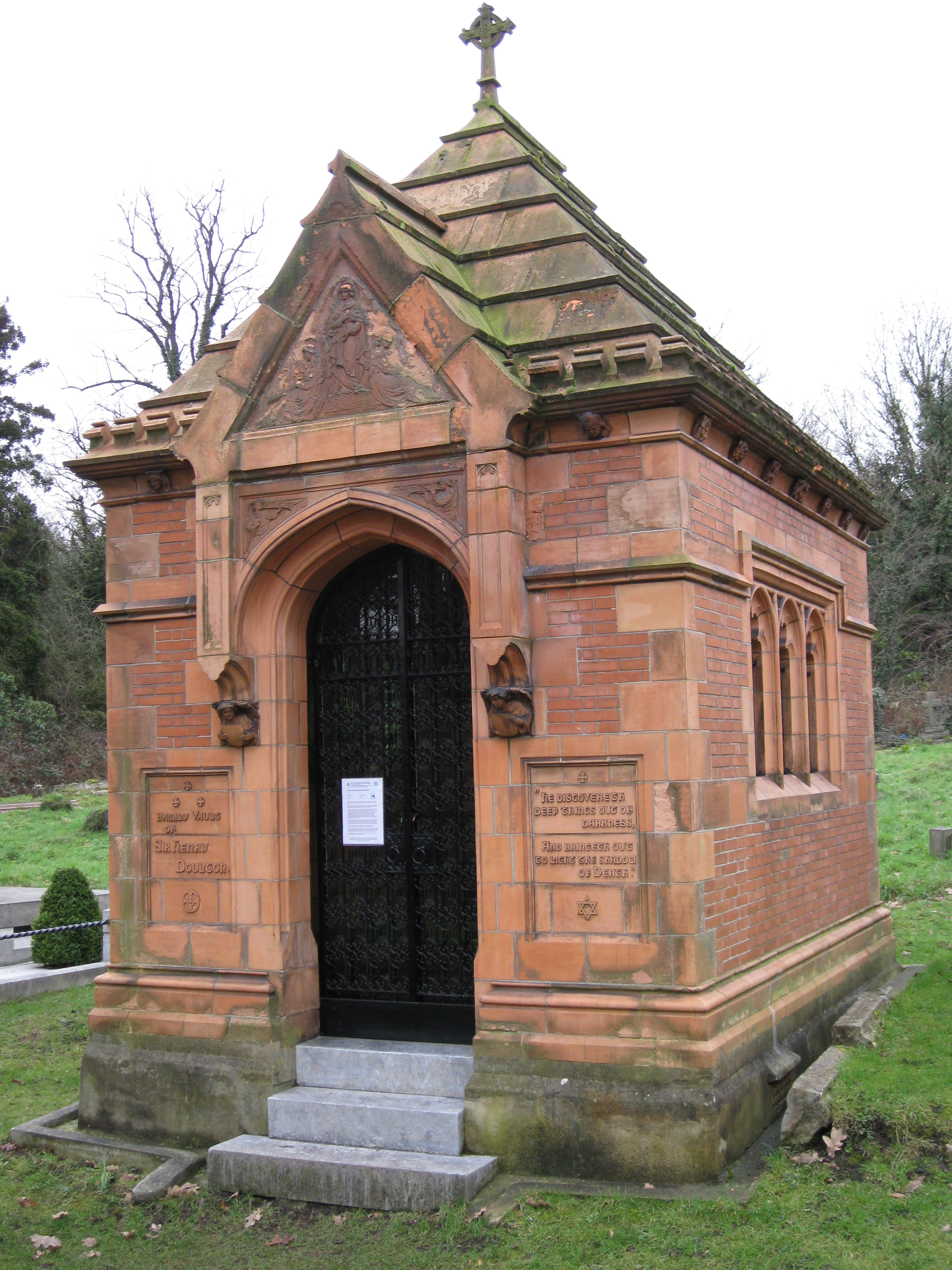
The Doulton terracotta mausoleum, listed Grade II

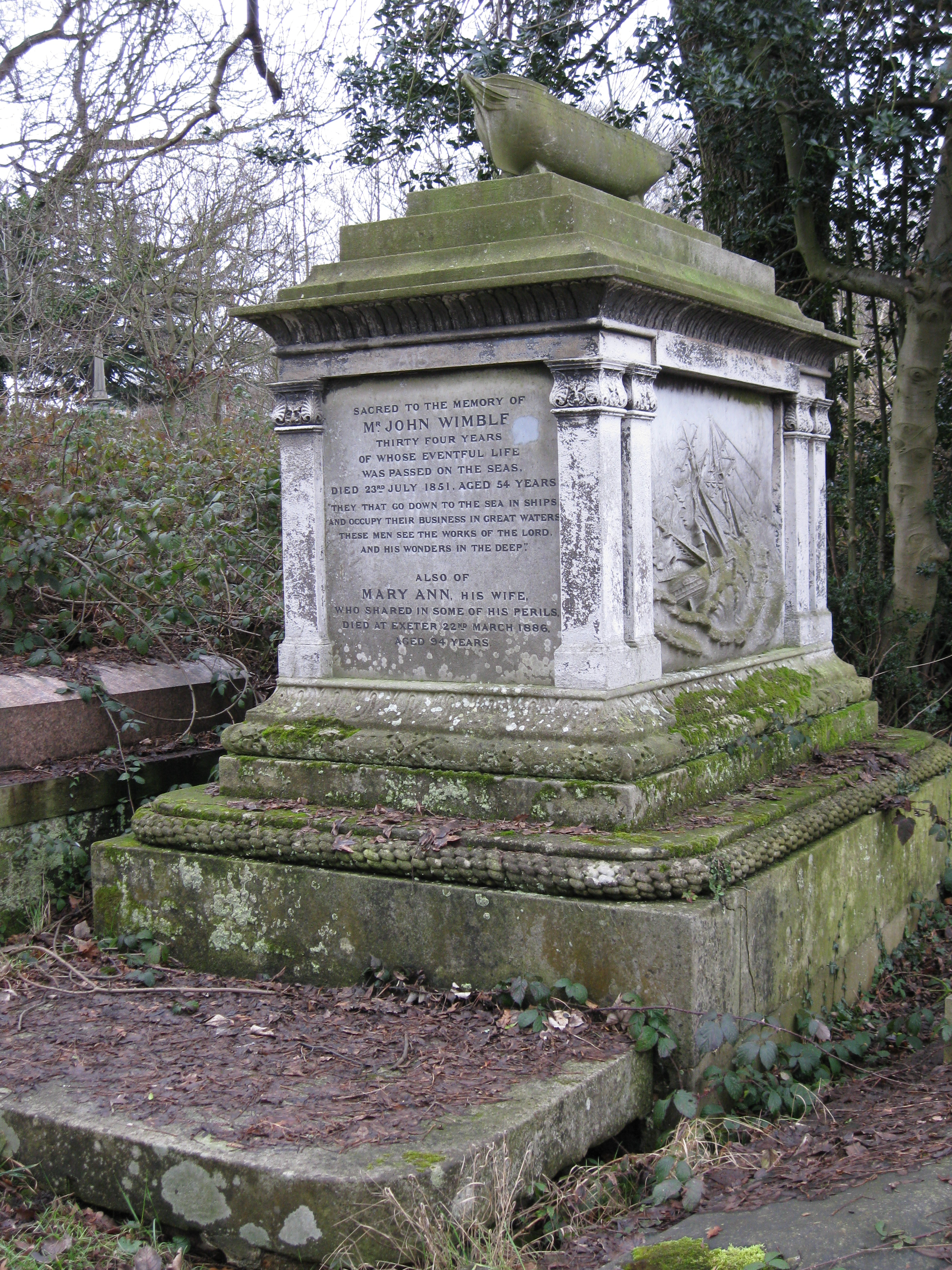
The John Wimble memorial on Ship Path, grade II

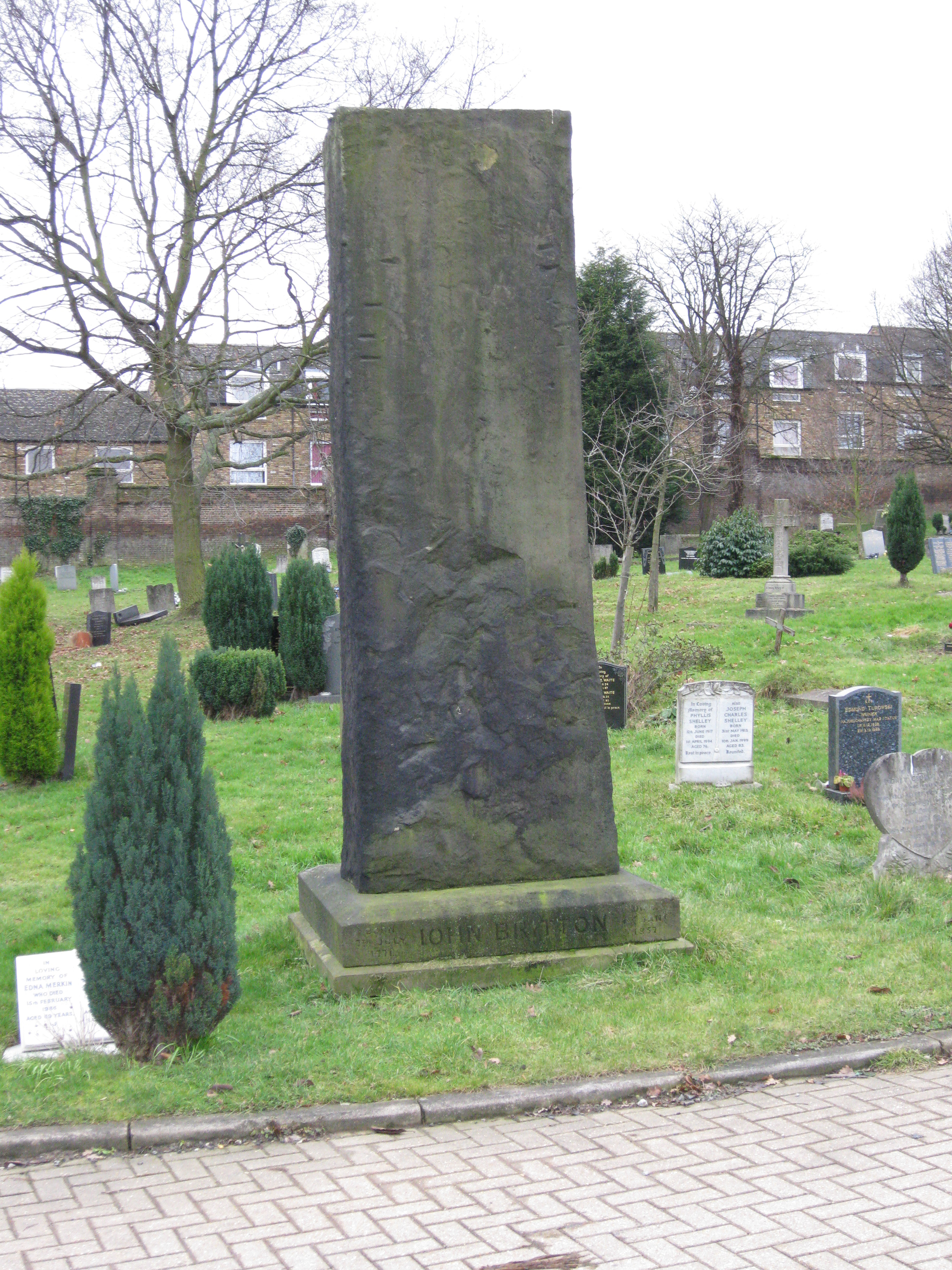
The Britton dolmen, grade II*

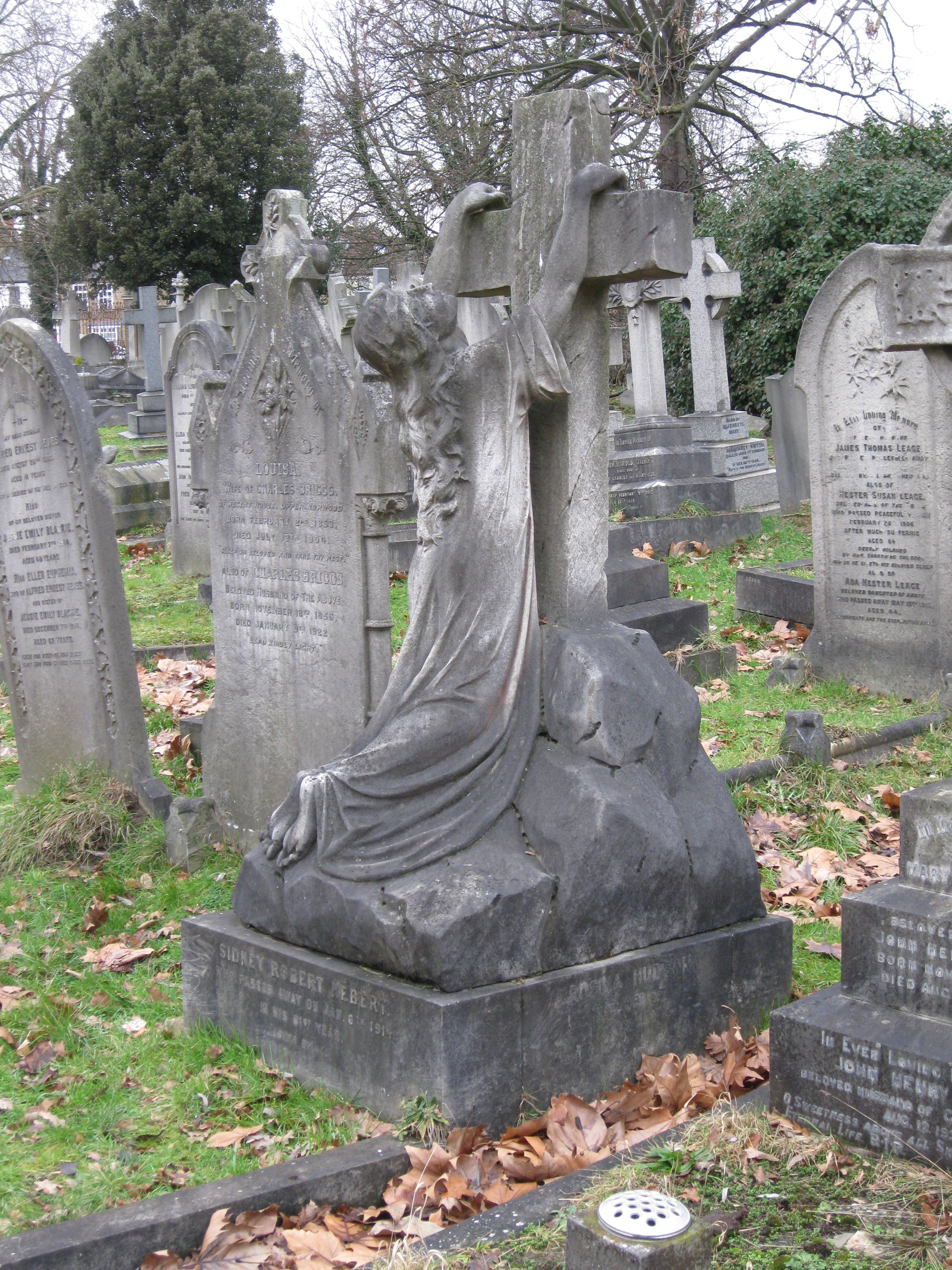
The grave of Sidney Robert Hebert

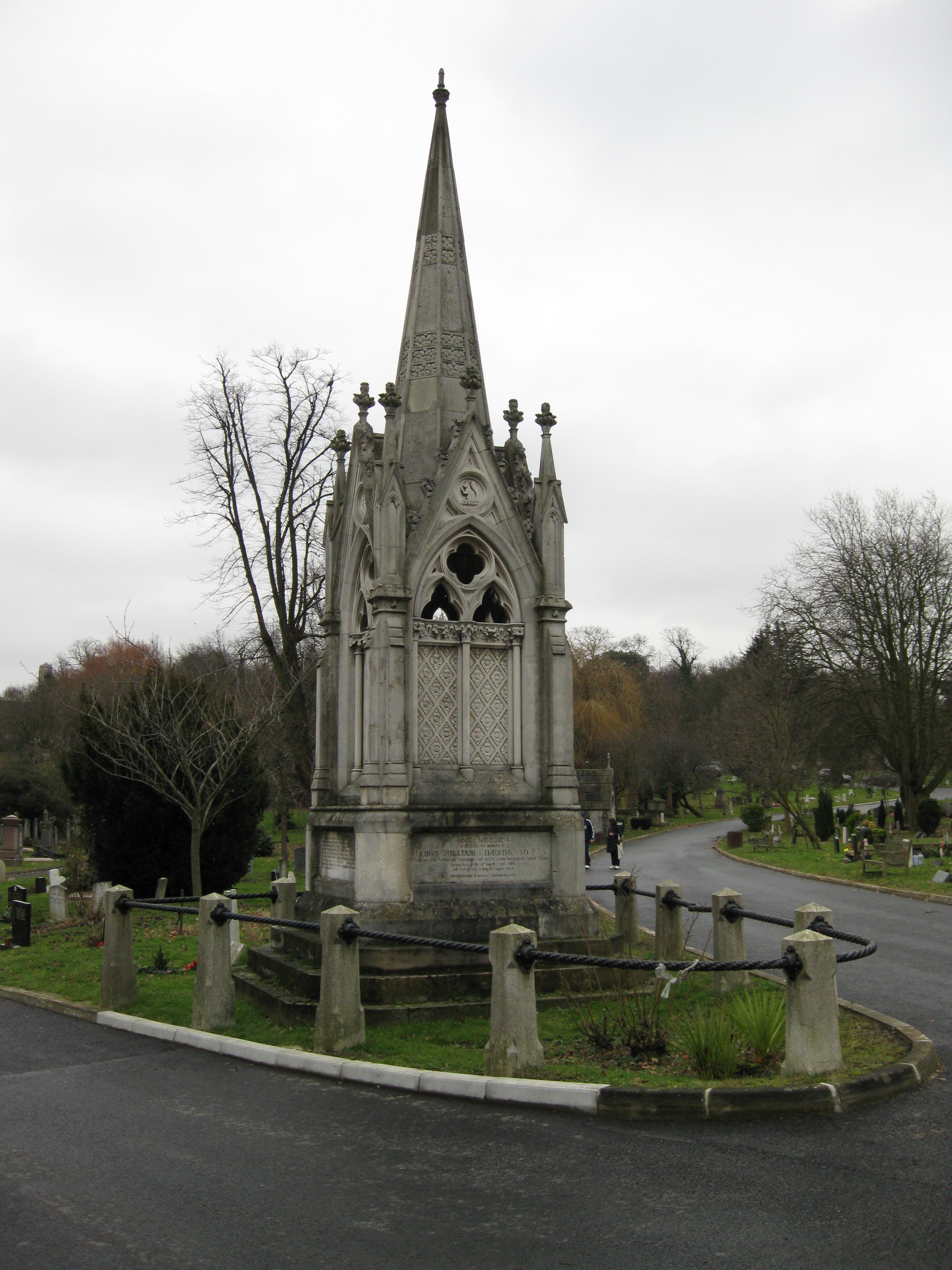
The J.W. Gilbart memorial, grade II

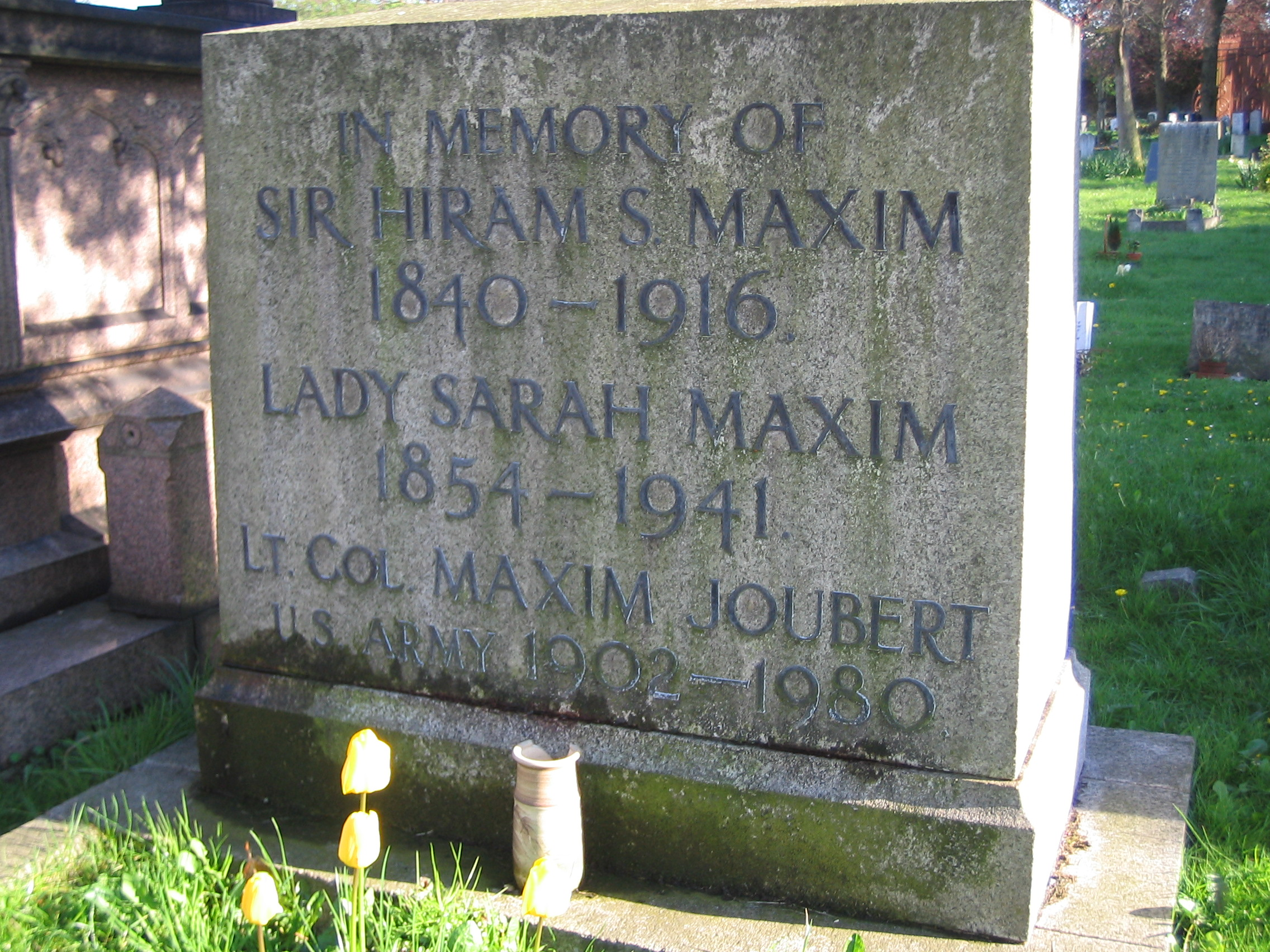
Stone of Sir Hiram Maxim

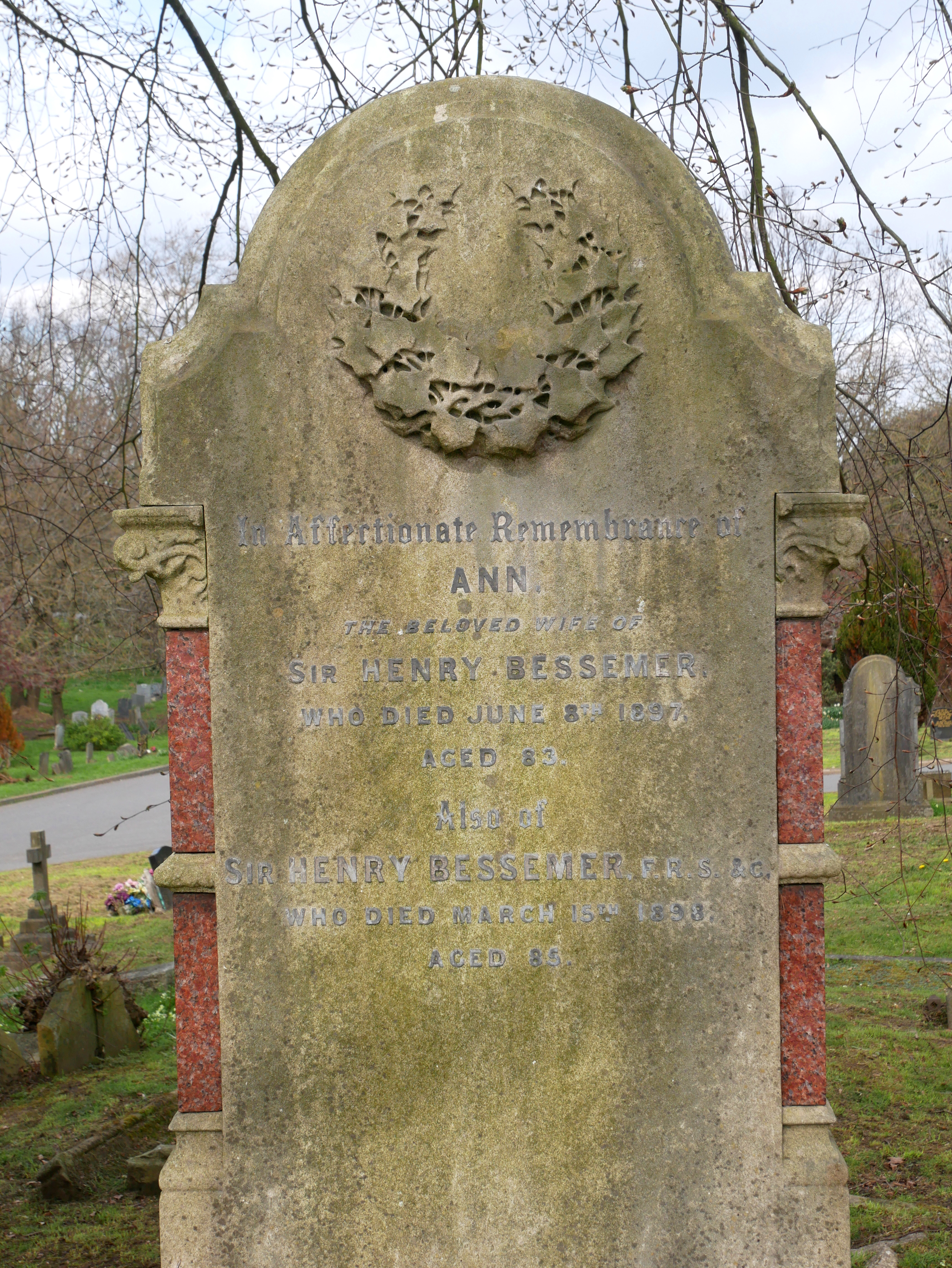
Ledger and headstone of Sir Henry Bessemer, grade II

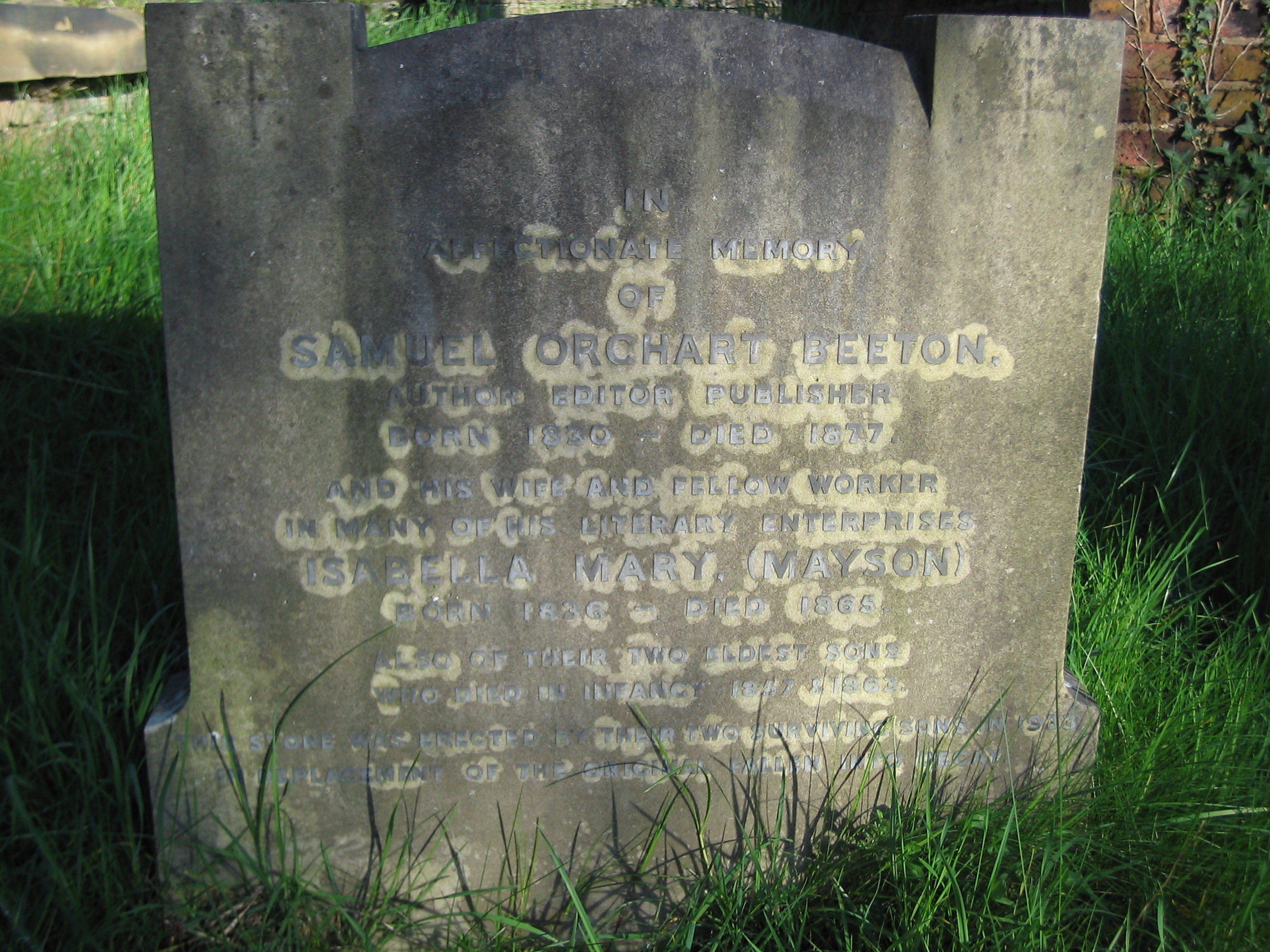
Headstone of Mrs Beeton

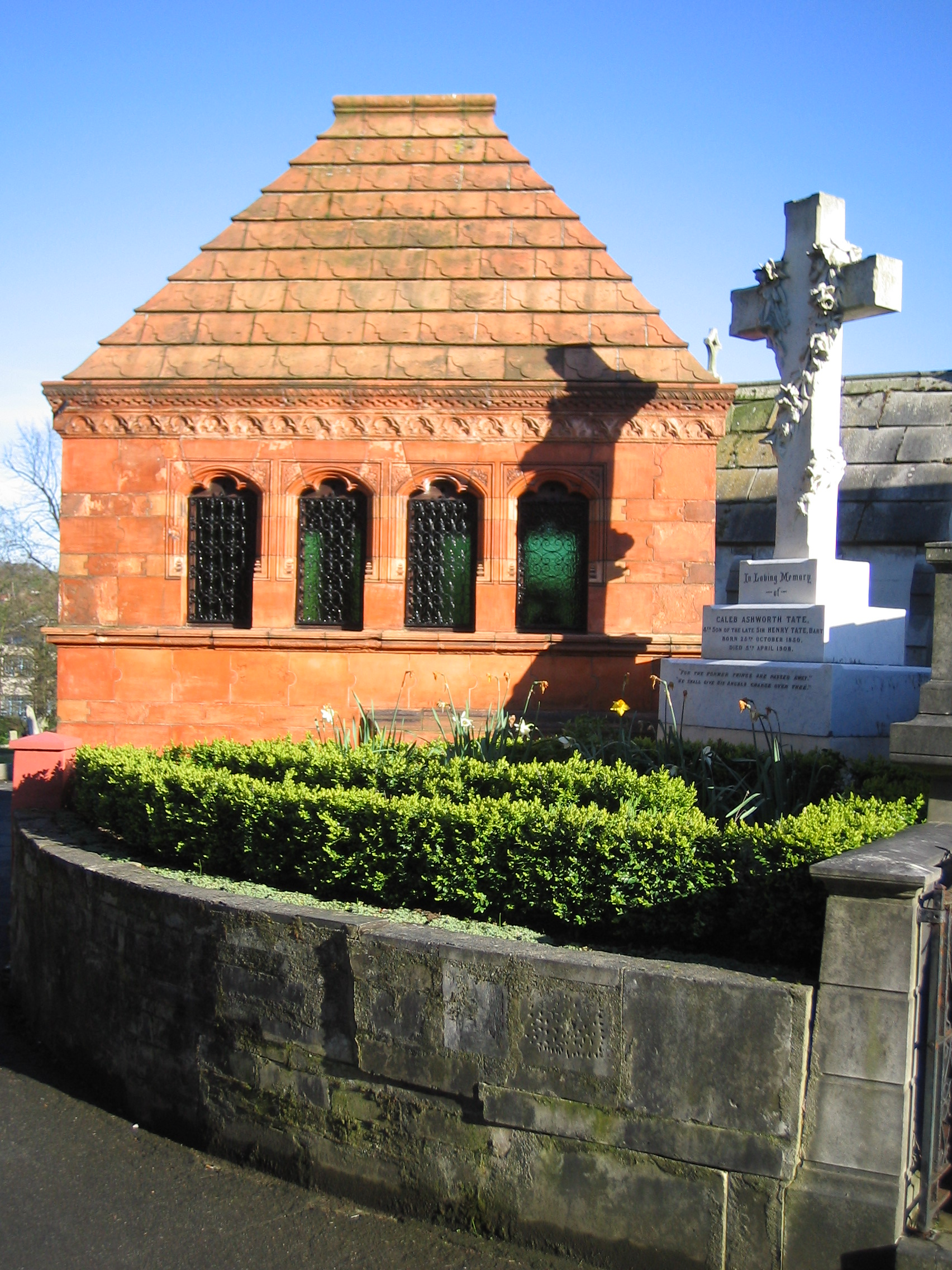
Ceramic mausoleum of Sir Henry Tate, grade II*

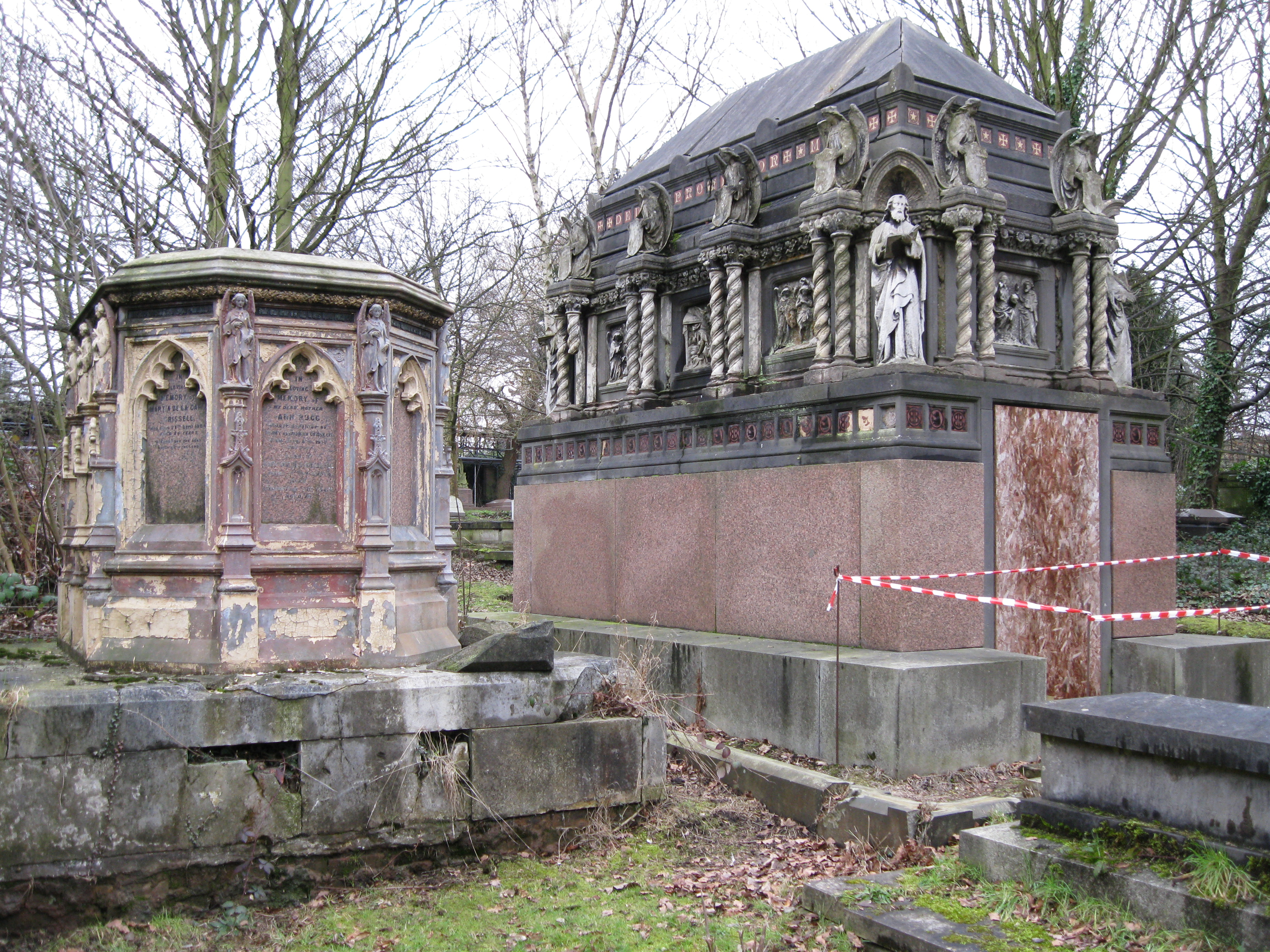
The iron monument of Grissell on left, grade II, the granite and limestone mausoleum of Alexander Berens by E.M. Barry on right, grade II*

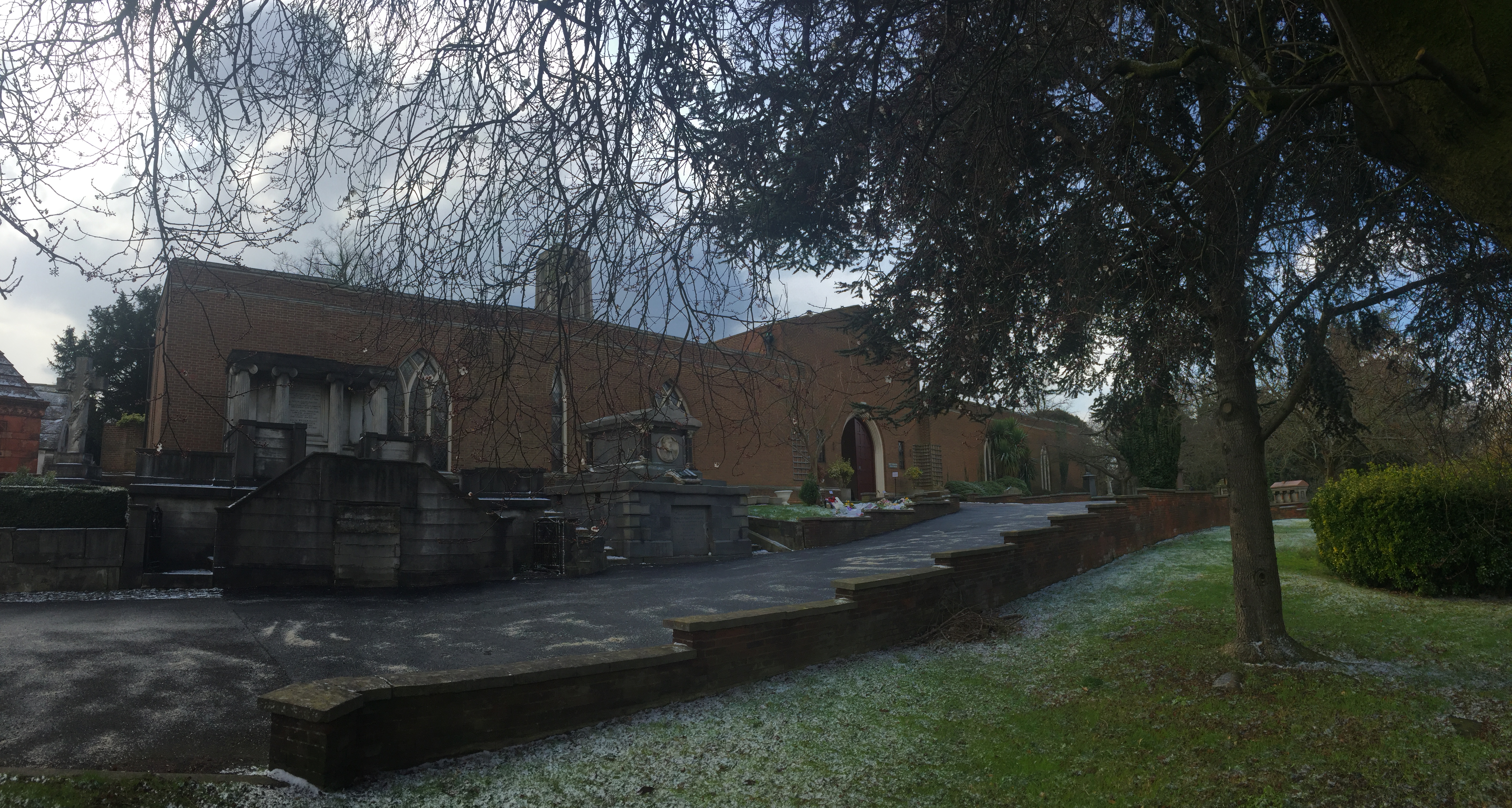
Front entrance of crematorium, with access to chapel

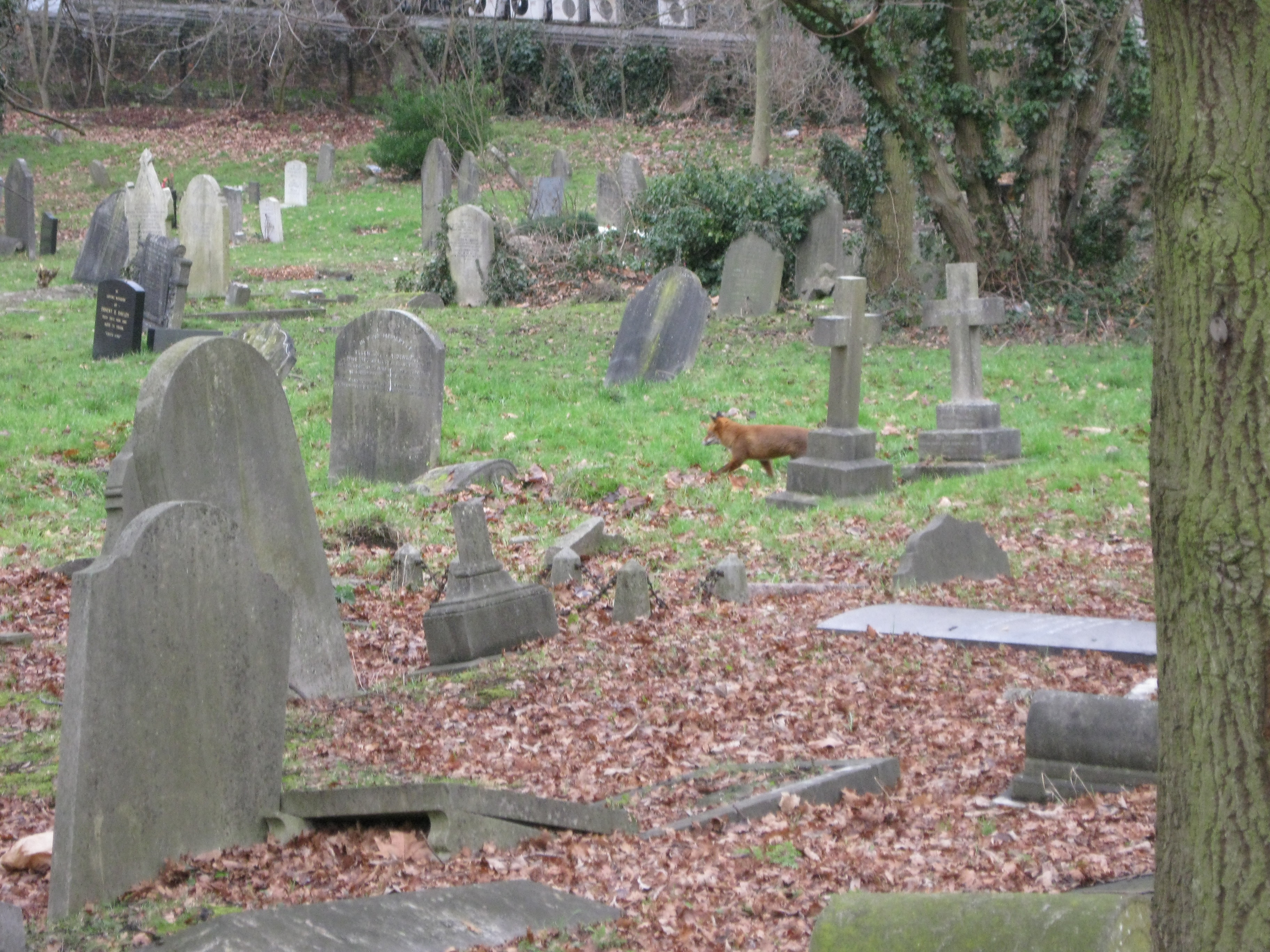
Wildlife in the cemetery

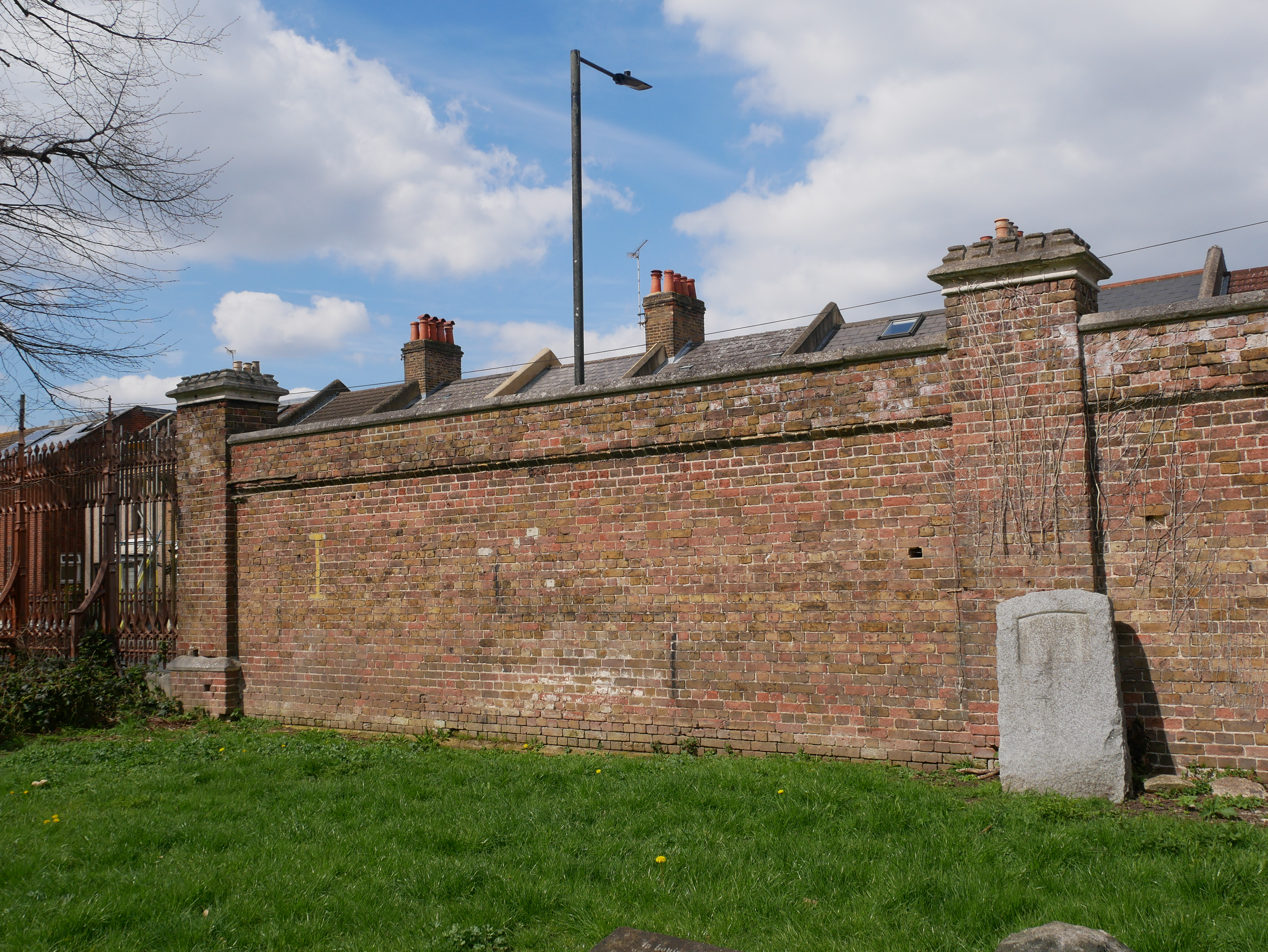
North perimeter wall

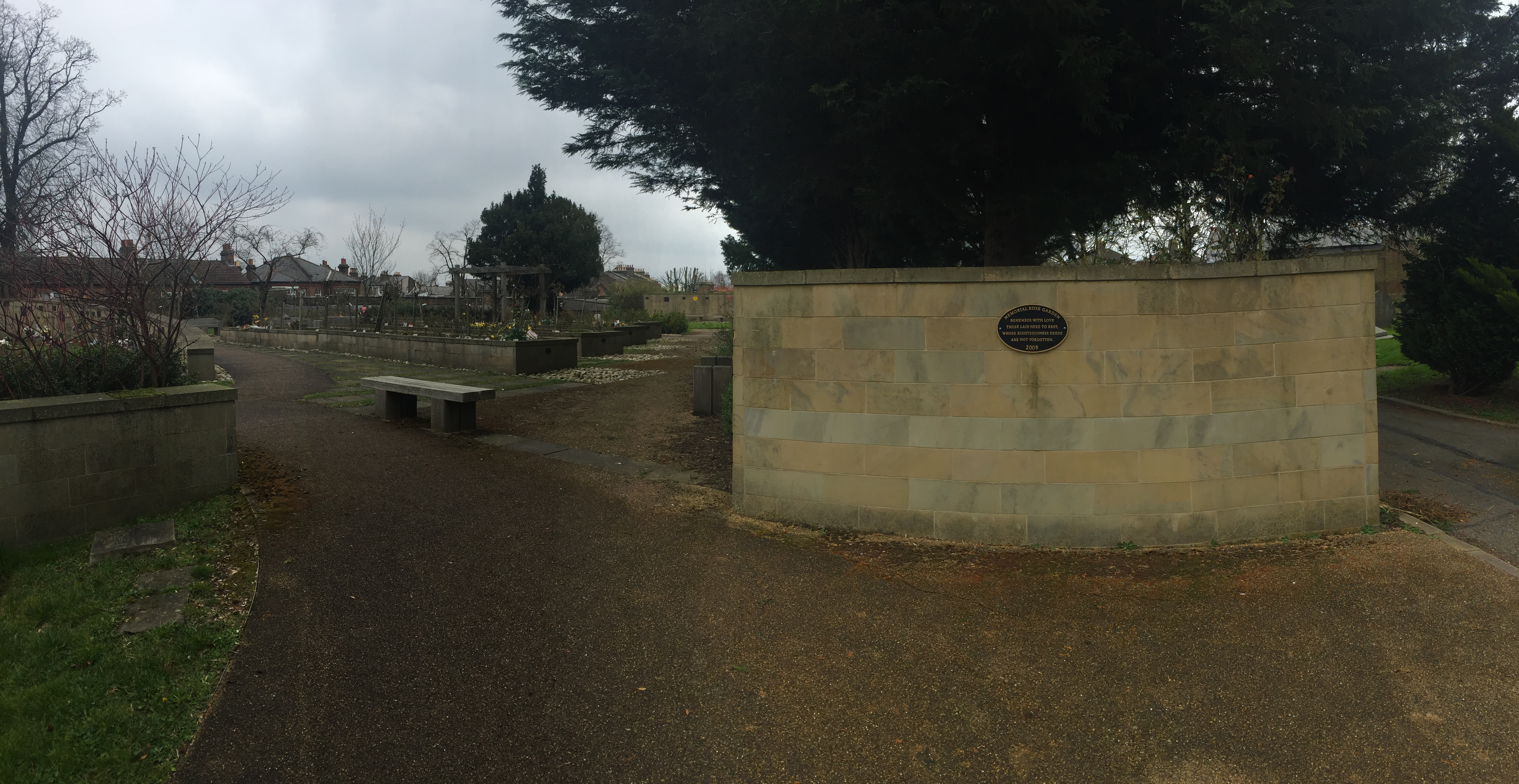
The memorial rose garden

== Cemeteries nearby ==
- This cemetery 51.4330°N 0.0982°W
- Camberwell Old Cemetery 51.4508°N 0.0585°W
- Camberwell New Cemetery 51.4542°N 0.0477°W
- Nunhead Cemetery 51.4636°N 0.0528°W
- Lambeth Cemetery 51.4276°N 0.1820°W
- Streatham Cemetery 51.4335°N 0.1745°W

== Transport ==
The cemetery is easily reached by public transport:

- Bus: 2, 68, 196, 315, 322, 432, 468 all have stops nearby
- Train: West Norwood railway station is close by
- Underground: Brixton station.
