= Maria Zambaco =

British artist and model of Greek descent (1843–1914)

Maria Cassavetti Zambaco
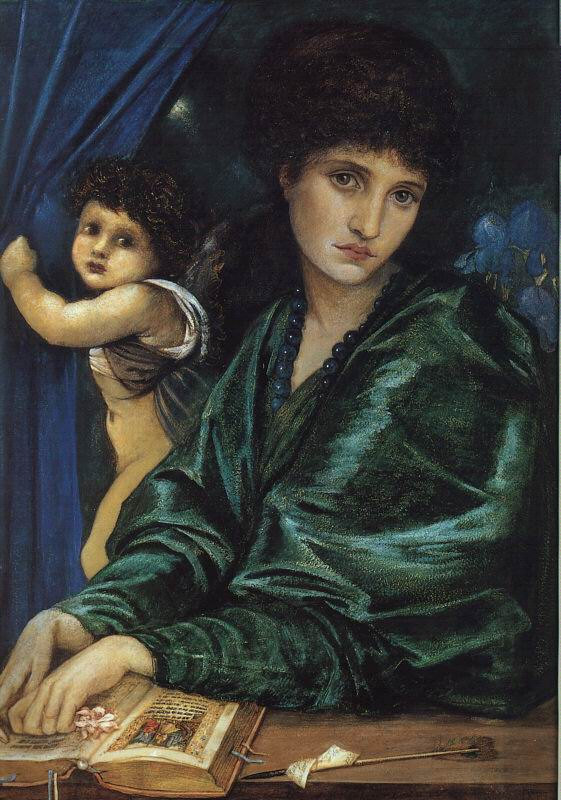
- Maria Zambaco, née Cassavetti, in Cupid and Psyche by Edward Burne-Jones, 1870
- Born: Marie Terpsithea Cassavetti; 29 April 1843; London, England
- Died: 14 July 1914 (aged 71); Paris, France
- Education: Slade School
- Movement: Pre-Raphaelite Brotherhood, Aesthetic Movement, Arts and Crafts Movement

Maria Zambaco (29 April 1843, Lambeth (London) – 14 July 1914, Paris), born Marie Terpsithea Cassavetti (Greek: Μαρία Τερψιθέα Κασσαβέτη, sometimes spelled Maria Tepsithia Kassavetti or referred to as Mary), was a sculptor and a Pre-Raphaelite British artist's model of Greek descent.

== Early life ==
Maria was a daughter of wealthy Anglo-Hellenic merchant Demetrios Cassavetti (d.1858) and his wife Euphrosyne (1822–1896) and niece of the Greek Consul and noted patron Alexander Constantine Ionides. Maria and her cousins Marie Spartali Stillman and Aglaia Coronio were known collectively among friends as "the Three Graces", after the Charites of Greek mythology. After inheriting her father's fortune in 1858, she was able to lead a more independent life and was known to go unchaperoned while still unmarried.

== Artistic life ==
Maria dedicated herself to art, and studied at the Slade School under Alphonse Legros and under Auguste Rodin in Paris. She worked as a sculptor in the 1880s, sharing studio space in Chelsea, London with Louise Jopling. The British Museum holds four of her medals that she donated, depicting the heads of young girls. British Museum holdings: Museum numbers- Medal 1 1887,1207.1, Medal 2 1887,0209.1 and Medals 3 and 4 1887,0209.2.

She exhibited at the Royal Academy in 1887 and the 1889 Arts and Crafts Exhibition Society in London. She exhibited at the Paris Salon as well.

Familiar within the circles of the Pre-Raphaelites for her dark red hair and pale skin, she did her most notable modelling for artist Edward Burne-Jones. She also sat as a model for James McNeill Whistler and Dante Gabriel Rossetti.

== Personal life ==
In 1860, she frightened off her first admirer, George du Maurier, who called her 'rude and unapproachable but of great talent and a really wonderful beauty'. Instead she married Dr Zambaco in 1860, initially living with him in France. She had a son and a daughter by him. The marriage was not a success and she moved back to live with her mother in London in 1866.

Burne-Jones first met her in 1866, when her mother commissioned him to paint her as Cupid and Psyche, and they had an affair which lasted until at least January 1869 and they stayed in contact after. In Georgiana Burne-Jones's The Memorials of Edward Burne-Jones, the affair is not mentioned but the years 1868–1871 are described as 'Heart, thou and I here, sad and alone' (from John Keats's poem: Why Did I Laugh Tonight?). In 1869, Edward Burne-Jones attempted to leave his wife for her, which caused a great scandal. Maria entreated him to commit suicide with her by laudanum overdose by the canal in Little Venice and the police had to be called.

After they broke up, Maria continued to appear in Burne-Jones' paintings as a sorceress or a temptress, such as in his last major work of her, The Beguiling of Merlin (1872–1877), and the controversial Phyllis and Demophoön (1870), which was removed from display at the Royal Watercolour Society. Friends of the Burne-Jones family, such as Rosalind Howard, cut Maria socially.

== Later life and death ==
She died in Paris in 1914 and her body was returned for interment in the family sarcophagus at the Greek Orthodox necropolis of the South Metropolitan Cemetery at Norwood, where she is recorded under her maiden name.

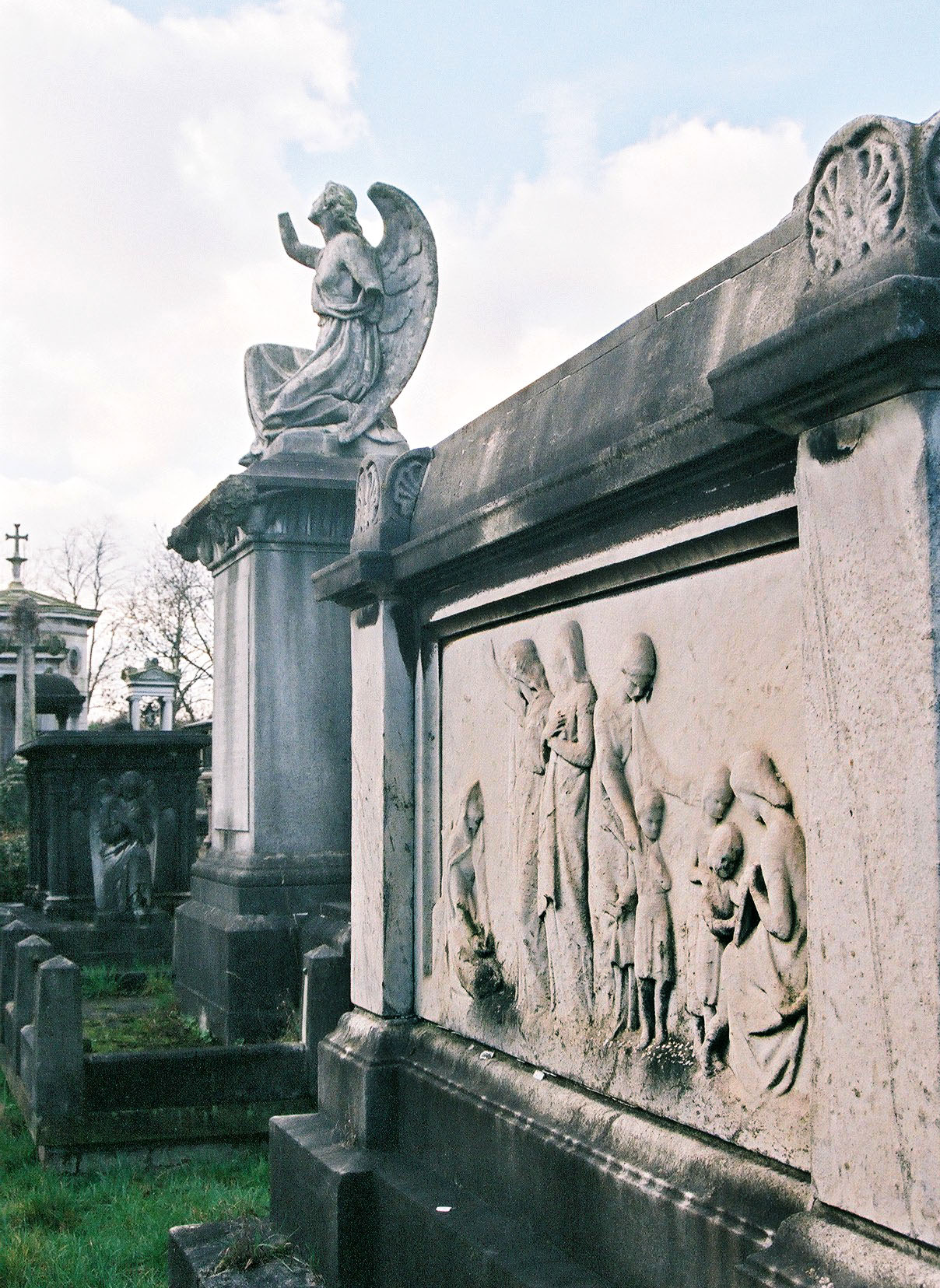
The Cassavetti family's sarcophagus at West Norwood Cemetery

== Gallery ==
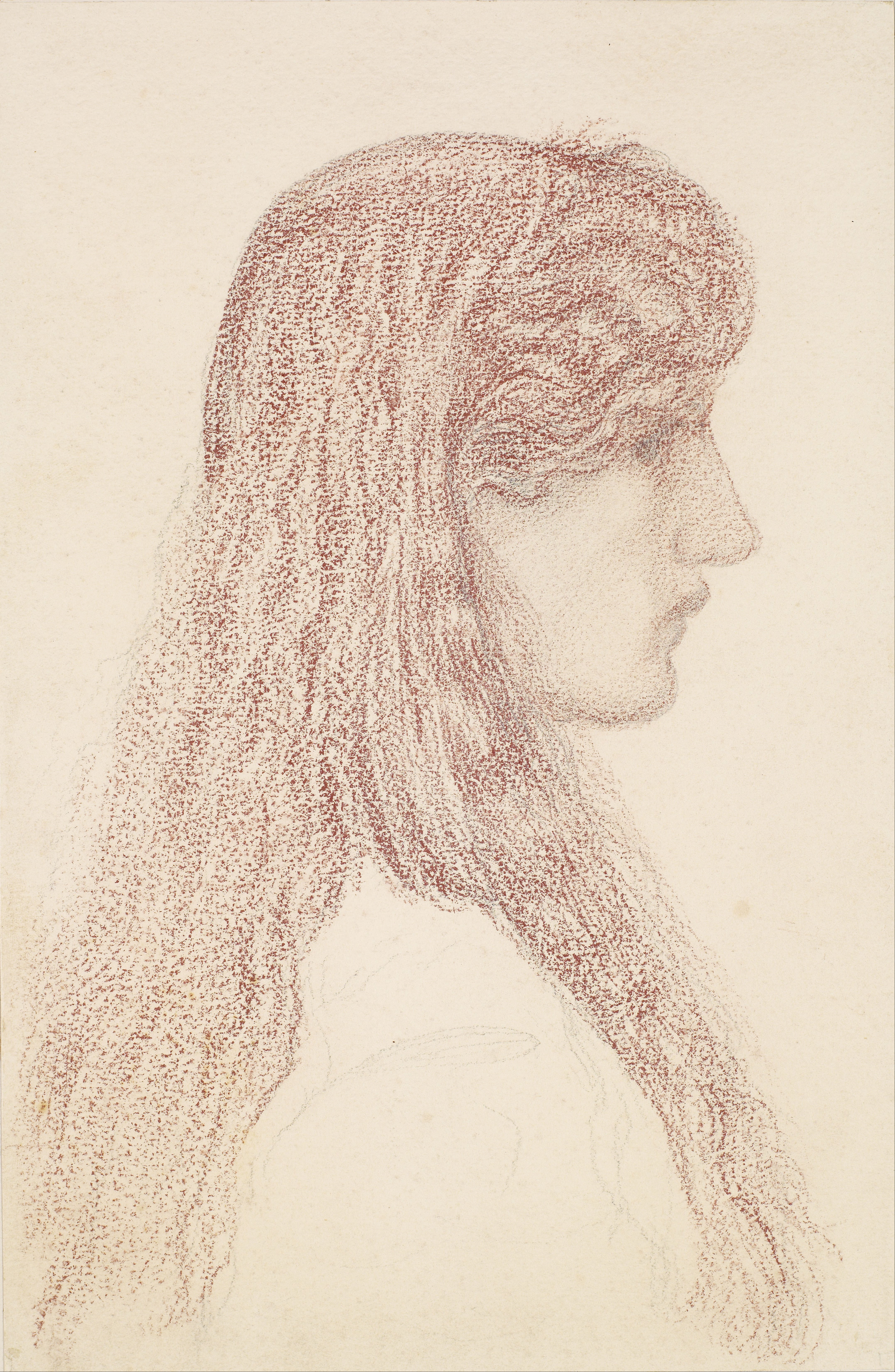
Study by Edward Burne-Jones, 1866, Pastel on paper, 20.5 x 31.4 cm, Birmingham Museum and Art Gallery

Portrait by Dante Gabriel Rossetti, c. 1870

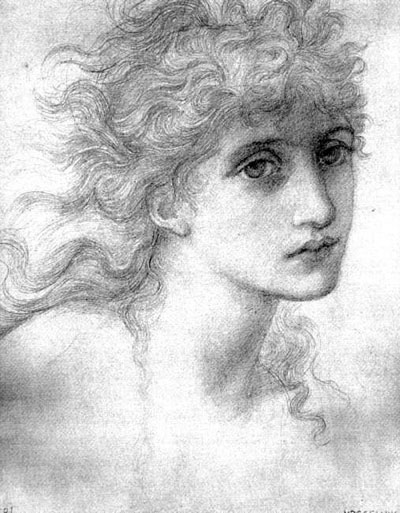
Study by Edward Burne-Jones, c.1870

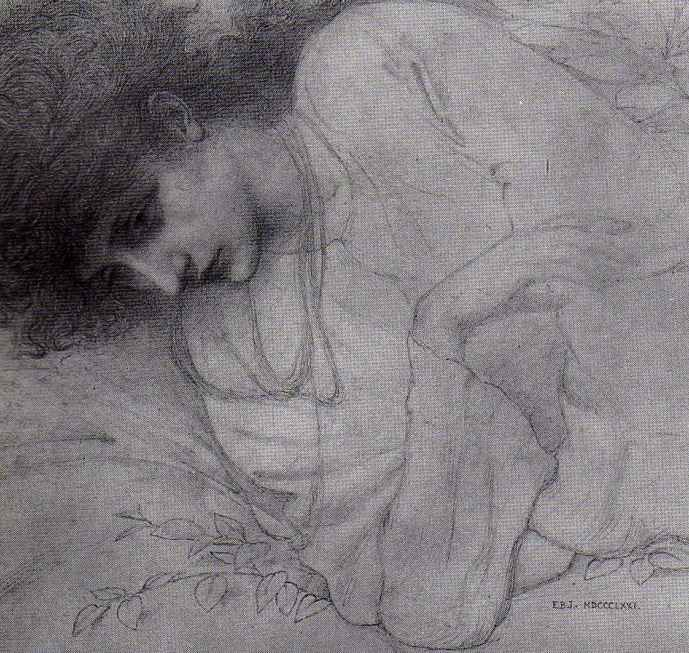
Portrait of Maria Zambaco, by Edward Burne-Jones, 1871

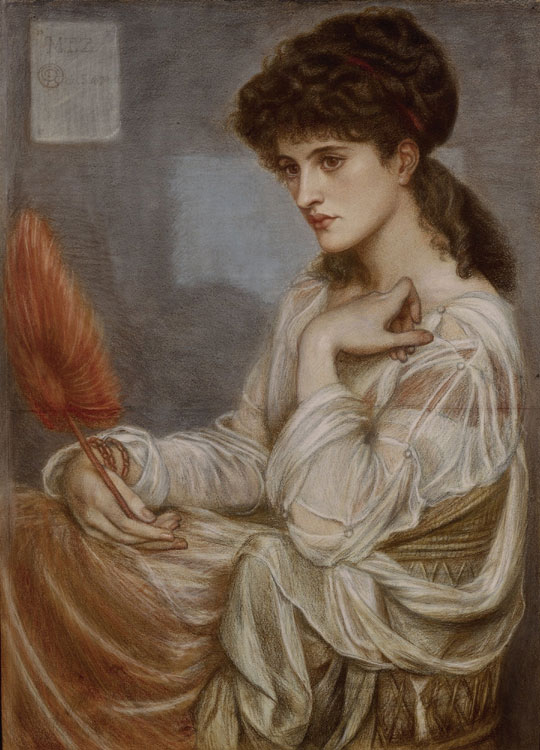
Maria Theresa Zambaco, Dante Gabriel Rossetti, 1870, Pastel on paper, 100 x 72 cm, Clemens Sels Museum Neuss

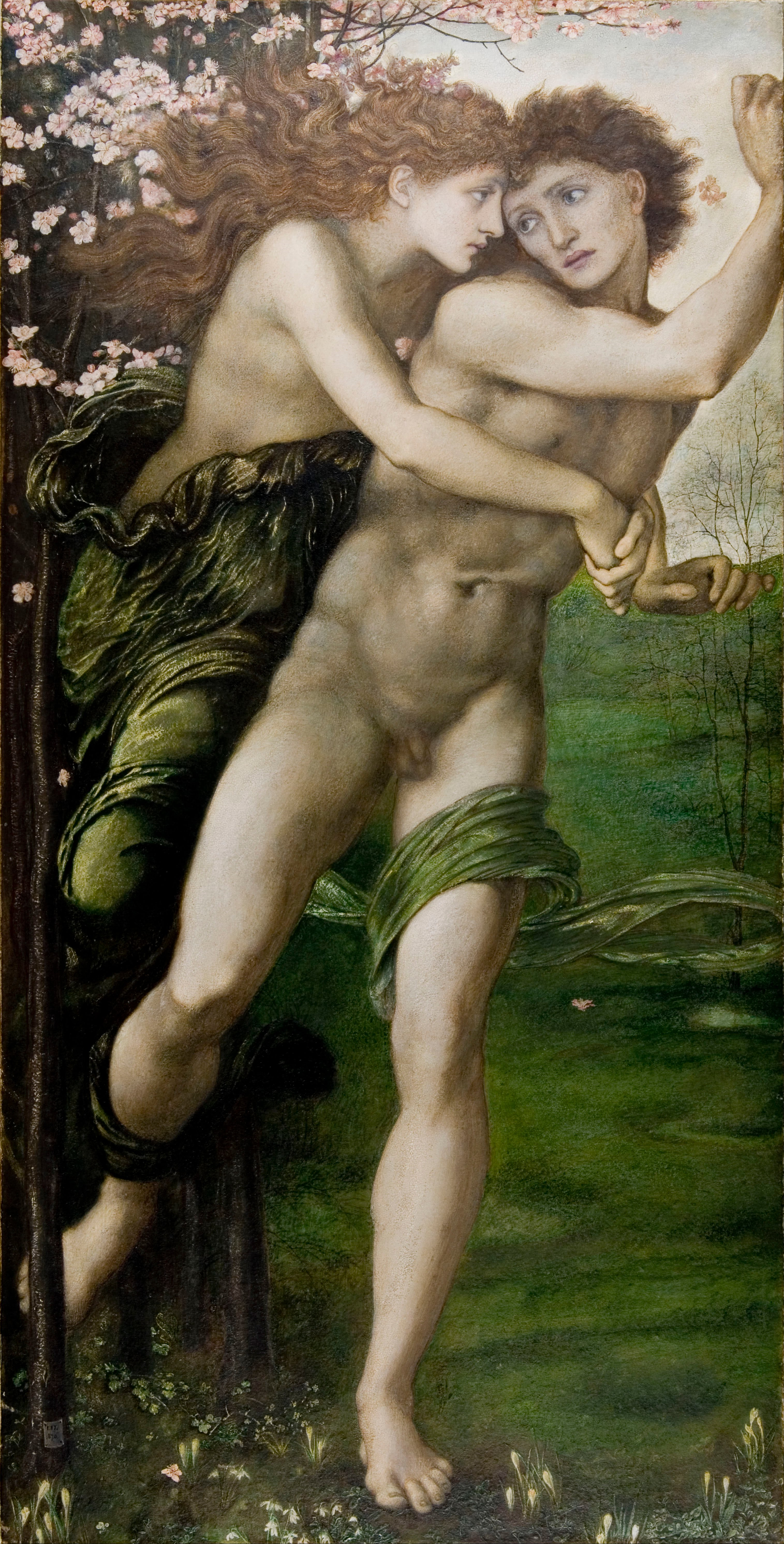
Phyllis and Demophoön, by Edward Burne-Jones, 1870, Birmingham Museum and Art Gallery

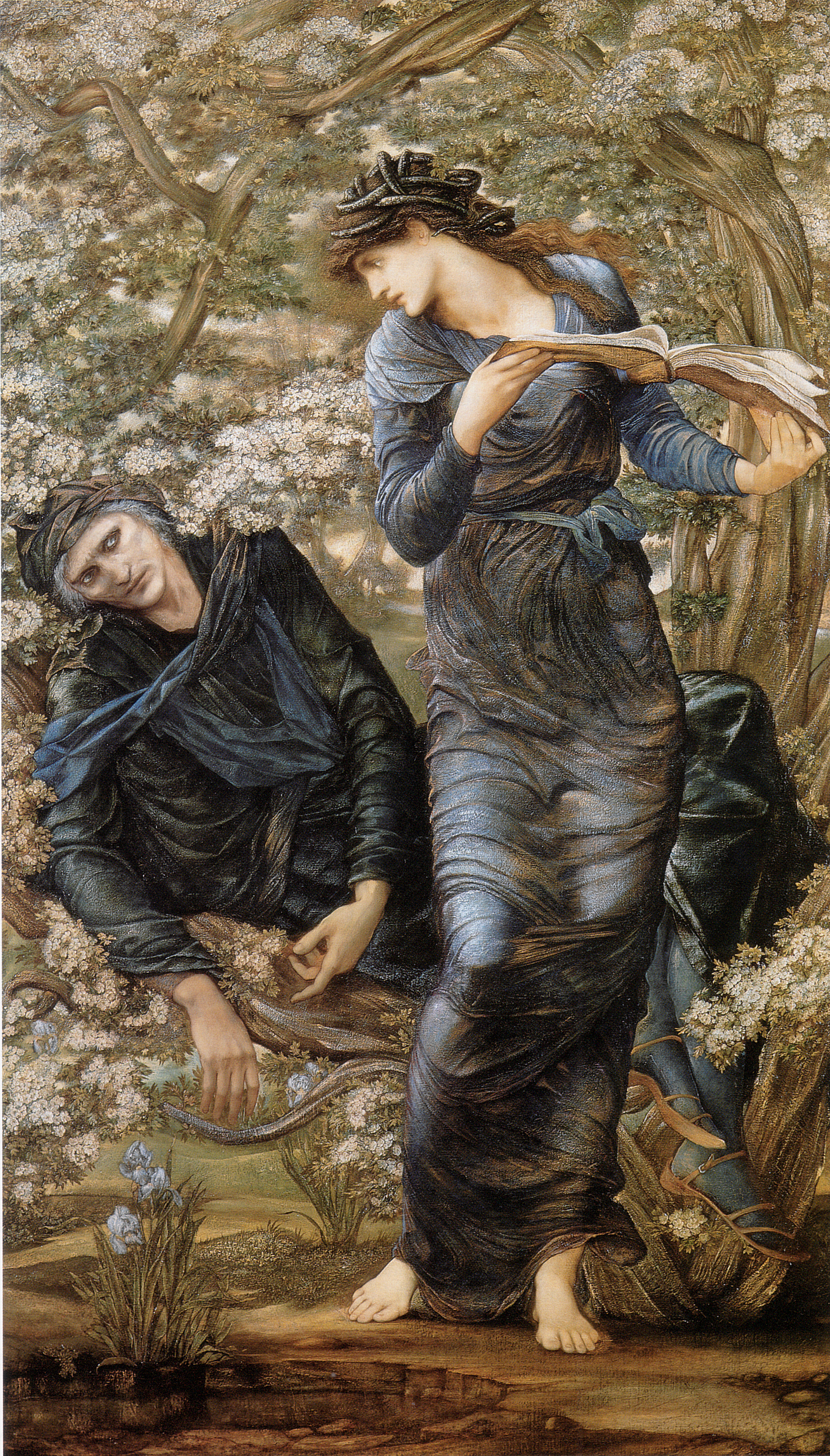
The Beguiling of Merlin, by Edward Burne-Jones, 1872–1877, Lady Lever Art Gallery

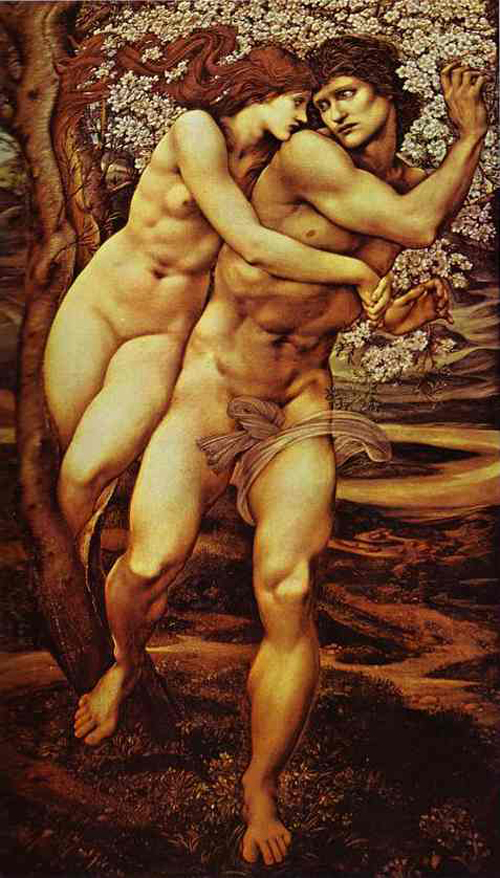
The Tree of Forgiveness, by Edward Burne-Jones, 1882, Lady Lever Art Gallery

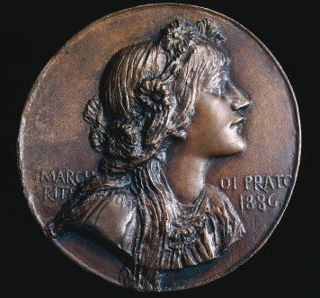
Medal, c. 1885, alloy, 11.5 cm, British Museum, Museum number 1887,0209.2
