= Eric William Marsden =

Eric William Marsden (22 February 1926 – 1975) was a British scholar of classical antiquity affiliated with the University of Liverpool. Marsden authored in particular Greek and Roman Artillery, a major two-volume reference work on classical ancient artillery.

In the Second World War Marsden served in the Royal Artillery on 25-pounder guns. For 25 years he studied Greek and Roman artillery, including 15 years spent on his Greek and Roman Artillery. Marsden also analysed Polybius as a military historian, concluding that he was an accurate reporter of military events. Marsden died prematurely, aged 49, and was survived by his son John.

== Greek and Roman Artillery ==
The first volume of Marsden's Greek and Roman Artillery appeared in 1967. It is based on copious evidence, including archaeological, such as ancient representations and artillery fortifications, and literary evidence, such as descriptions of the artillery in action in the works of ancient writers. The second volume, published in 1969, consists of all relevant Greek and Roman texts, particularly technical treatises, edited and translated.
