= Alexander Edwin Marsden =

Alexander Edwin Marsden (1832–1902) was an English surgeon and cancer specialist.

== Life ==
Born on 22 September 1832, he was the only surviving child of his father William Marsden and his first wife. He was educated at Wimbledon school and King's College, London, and was admitted a licentiate of the Society of Apothecaries in 1853 and M.R.C.S. England in 1854. He graduated with a medical degree from the University of St Andrews, in 1862 and became F.R.C.S. Edinburgh in 1868.

Entering the British Army in 1854 as staff assistant surgeon, Marsden served in the Crimean War. For three months he was in the general hospital at Scutari; early in 1855 he was sent to Sevastopol with the 38th Regiment, and then acted as a surgeon to the ambulance corps until the end of the war, when he received the Crimean and Turkish medals.

On his return to England Marsden was appointed surgeon to the Royal Free Hospital, London (founded by his father), where he was also curator of the museum and general superintendent. At the Brompton Cancer Hospital, also founded by his father he was surgeon from 1853 to 1884; consulting surgeon from 1884 until his death; trustee from 1865; member of the house committee from 1870, and chairman of the general committee from 1901.

In 1898 Marsden was master of the Worshipful Company of Cordwainers. He died at 92 Nightingale Lane, Wandsworth Common, London on 2 July 1902.

== Works ==
Marsden published:

- A New and Certain Successful Mode of treating Certain Forms of Cancer, 1869; reissued 1874 (a collection of extracts, 1870).
- The Treatment of Cancers and Tumours by Chian Turpentine, 1880.
- Our Present Means of successfully treating or alleviating Cancer, 1889.

He also edited in 1871 the fourth edition of his father's treatise on Malignant Diarrhœa, better known by the Name of Asiatic or Malignant Cholera.

== Family ==
In 1856 Marsden married his cousin Catherine, only daughter of the banker David Marsden.
