= William Marsden (surgeon) =

English surgeon (1796–1867)

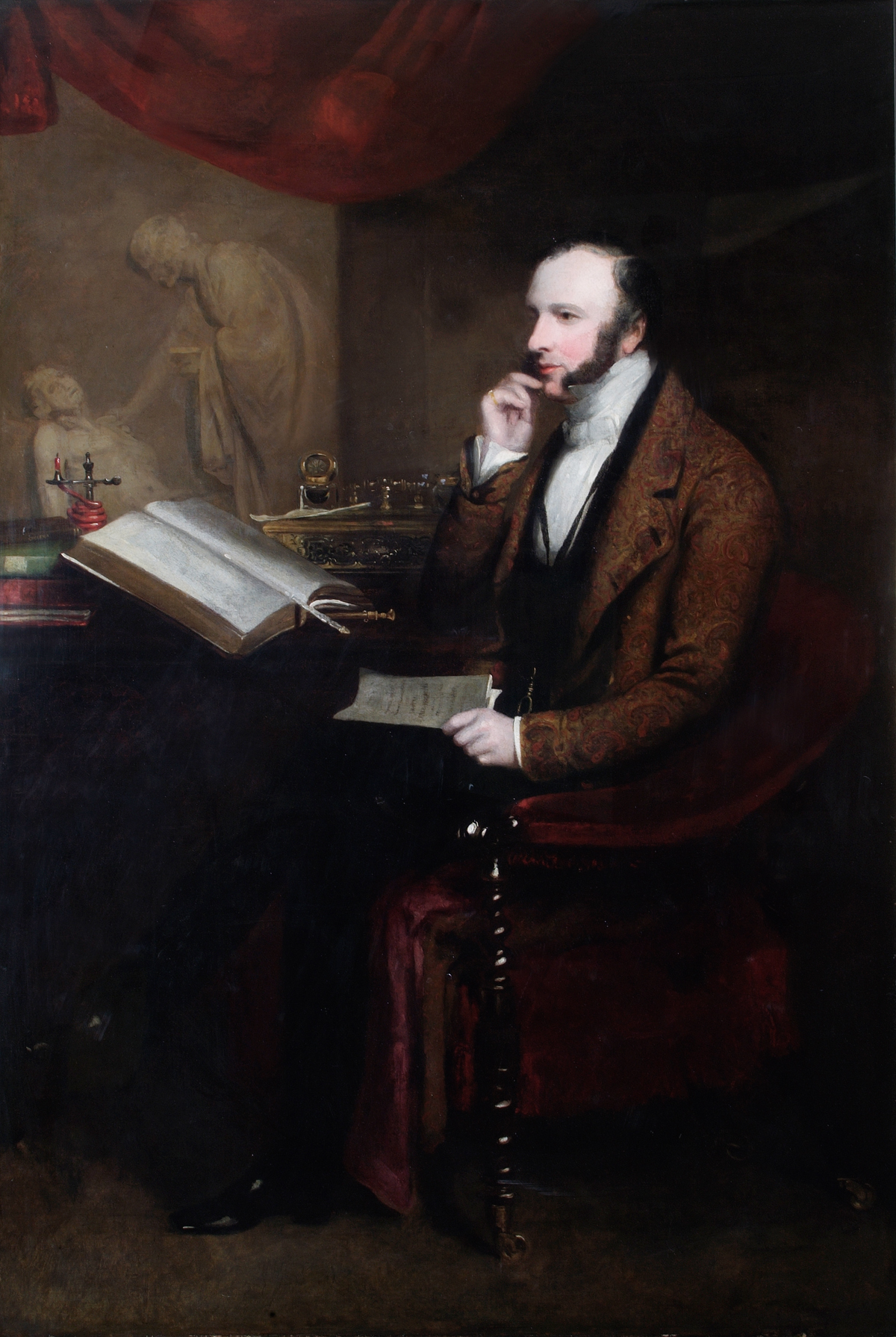
William Marsden by Thomas Henry Illidge.

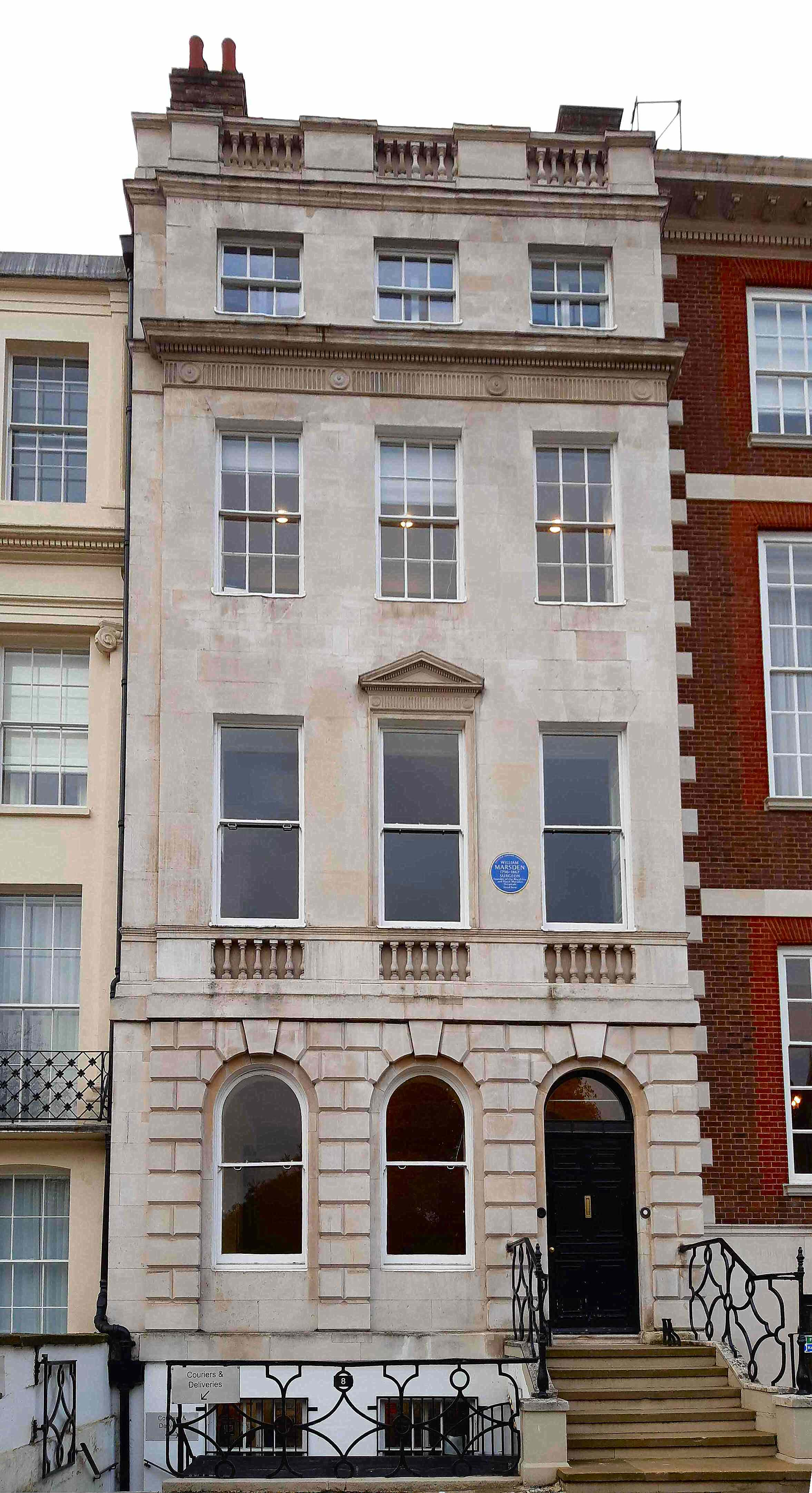
Marsden's house on Lincoln's Inn Fields, close to the Royal College of Surgeons

William Marsden (August 1796 – 16 January 1867) was an English surgeon whose main achievements are the founding of two presently well-known hospitals, the Royal Free Hospital (in 1828) and the Royal Marsden Hospital (in 1851).

== Biography ==
Marsden was born in August 1796, in Sheffield, Yorkshire, the youngest of eight children. When he left school he was apprenticed to a wholesale druggist in Sheffield. In 1816, he moved to London where he took up an apprenticeship to a surgeon-apothecary before setting up on his own. At the end of 1824, he enrolled as a student of surgery at St Bartholomew's Hospital under the famous surgeon and lecturer John Abernethy (1764–1831). In April 1827, Marsden passed his MRCS examination to qualify as a full surgeon. He became an MD in 1838.

After discovering the difficulties the poor had in obtaining medical treatment, Marsden sought to establish a free hospital in London for which "poverty and sickness are the only passports". In 1828, he set up a small dispensary at 16 Greville Street, Hatton Garden, Holborn, which was named the London General Institution for the Gratuitous Cure of Malignant Diseases. This was later constituted as the Royal Free Hospital, and moved to the Gray's Inn Road in the 1840s.

A few years later, Marsden turned his attention to people with cancer and, in 1851, set up another small establishment in Cannon Row, Westminster. This grew into the Brompton Cancer Hospital (now the Royal Marsden Hospital, Fulham Road site).

Marsden married Ann Bishop, known as Betsy-Ann, in 1820. They had four children, three sons and a daughter, but only one of them, Alexander Edwin Marsden, a surgeon (1832–1902), survived into adulthood. Betsy-Ann died of cancer in 1846 and Marsden married his second wife, Elizabeth Abbott.

William Marsden died at a hotel in Richmond, Surrey, on 16 January 1867, aged 70. He is buried in West Norwood Cemetery, South London.
