= Joan Marsden =

Canadian zoologist (1922–2001)

- Born: 1922
- Died: January 26, 2001; Barbados
- Citizenship: Canadian
- Education: McGill University; University of California, Berkeley
- Spouse: Michael Marsden
- Children: John Marsden, Katy Marsden, Mungo Marsden, and Henry Marsden
- Scientific career
- Fields: zoology
- Institutions: McGill University
- Thesis: Studies of embryonic and larval development in California Phoronidea (1951)

Joan Chauvin Marsden (née Rattenbury; 1922 – January 26, 2001) was a professor of zoology, chair of the zoology department at McGill University, president of the Canadian Society of Zoologists, and director of the Bellairs Institute in Barbados.

She studied the ecological, physiological, and neurobiological perspectives of the polychaete worm and (co-)authored more than 40 publications, at least 15 of which from her time at the Bellairs Institute.

== Early life and education ==
Marsden completed her Bachelor of Science (1943) and Master of Science (1944) at McGill University. She then went on to earn a PhD at the University of California, Berkeley in 1951.

== Research and career ==
Marsden returned to McGill and spent more than 60 total years at the university. Her first appointment was a role as lecturer in the department of zoology and she quickly climbed the academic ladder during a time when there were few female scientists at McGill.

Shortly after the 1954 founding of the Bellairs Institute, Marsden and fellow zoologist John Lewis were the first McGill professors to exploit the research opportunities the Caribbean institute had to offer. She traveled there almost yearly to conduct her research.

As chair of the Zoology Department, Marsden was instrumental in the creation of the Biology department through the fusion of the Departments of Zoology, Botany, and Genetics in 1969.

Marsden served as president of the Canadian Society of Zoologists from 1980 to 1981. Marsden retired from McGill in 1987. To honor her legacy and perpetuate her memory, her colleagues established the Joan Marsden Lectures in Organismal Biology.

== Select publications ==
- Marsden, J. R. (1962). "A coral-eating polychaete". Nature 193: 598.
- Marsden, J.R. (1988). "Light responses of planktotrophic larvae of the serpulid polychaete Galeolaria caespitosa." Mar. Biol. 99: 397-407.
- Marsden, J. (1987). "Coral preference behaviour by planktonic larvae of Spirobranchus giganteus corniculatus (Serpulid: Polychaeta)." Coral Reefs 6: 71-74.
- Marsden, J. and Hsieh, T. (1987). "Ultrastructure of the eyespot in three polychaeta trochophore larvae (Annelida)." Zoomorphology 106: 361-368.
- Marsden, J.R. (1986). Response to light by trochophore larvae of Spirobranchus giganteus: Effects of level of irradiance, dark adaptation and spectral distribution." Mar. Biol. 93: 13-16.
- Marsden, J.R. and Hassessian, H. (1986). Effects of Ca++ and catecholamines on swimming cilia of the trochophore larva of the polychaete Spirobranchus giganteus." J. Exp. Mar. Biol. Ecol. 95: 245–255.
- Marsden, J. R. (1990). "Light responses of the planktotrophic larva of the serpulid polychaete Spirobranchus polycerus". Marine Ecology Progress Series. 58 (3): 225–233. ISSN 0171-8630.

== Death ==
Marsden died unexpectedly at the age of 78 in the Barbados.
