= Marden (surname) =

Marden is a surname. Notable people with the surname include:

- Adrienne Marden (1909–1978), American actress
- Albert Marden (born 1934), American mathematician
- Anne Marden (rower) (born 1958), American rower
- Brice Marden (born 1938), American artist
- Harold C. Marden (1900–1994), American lawyer and judge
- John Louis Marden (1919–1999), British businessman and philanthropist
- John Marden (1855–1924), Australian headmaster, pioneer of women's education, and Presbyterian elder
- Julia Marden (born 1962), American artist
- Luis Marden (1913–2003), American photographer, explorer, writer, filmmaker, diver, navigator, and linguist
- Orison Swett Marden (1848–1924), American writer
- Robert A. Marden (1927-2017), American politician and attorney
- Thomas Marden (1866–1951), British major general
