= The Last Sight of Fiammetta =

Painting by Marie Spartali Stillman

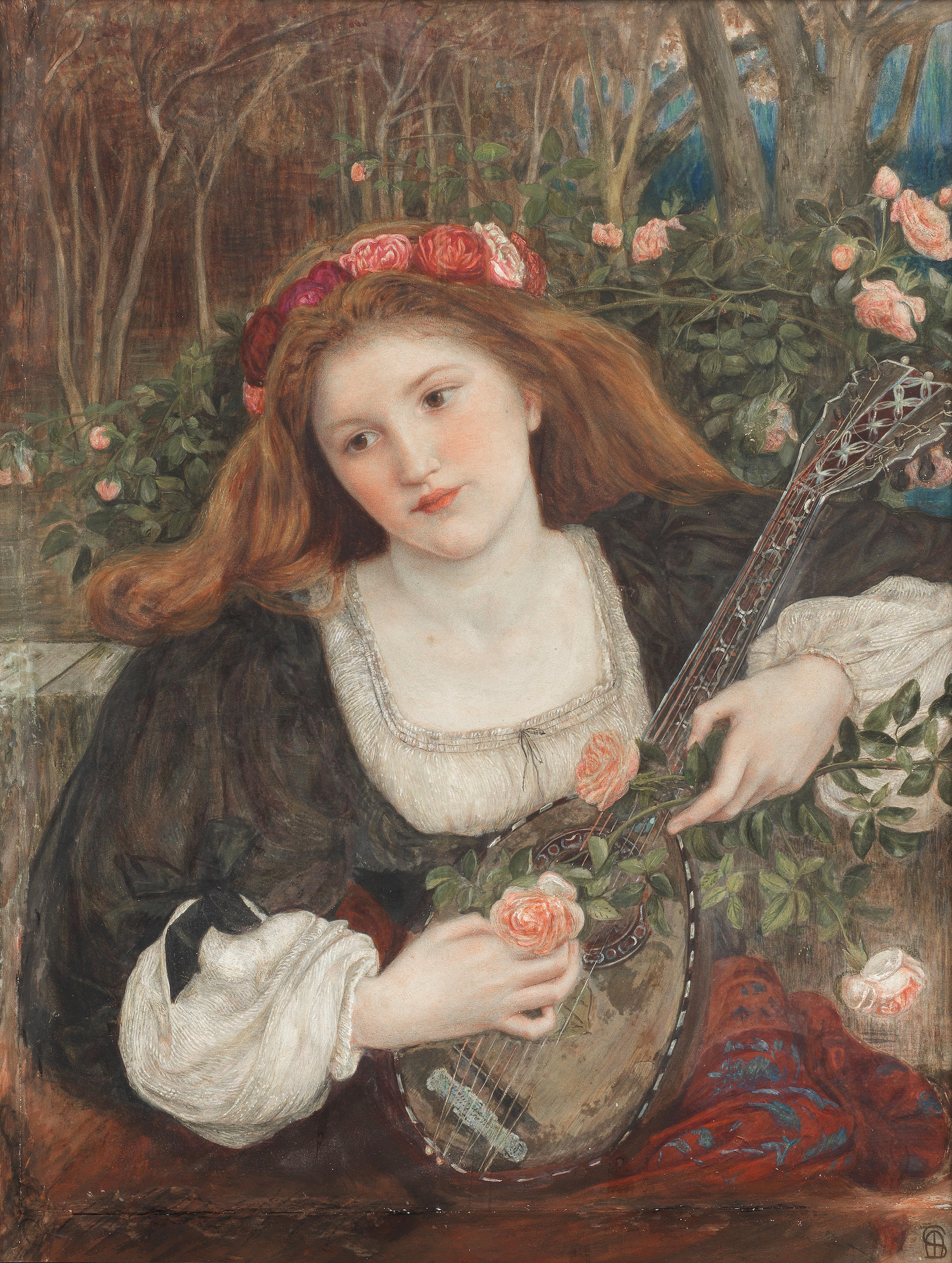
- Artist: Marie Spartali Stillman
- Year: c. 1876
- Type: pencil, watercolour, bodycolour and gum arabic on paper
- Dimensions: 82 cm × 62 cm (32 in × 24 in)
- Location: Private collection

The Last Sight of Fiammetta is an watercolour, bodycolour and gum arabic on paper painting by English painter Marie Spartali Stillman, from c. 1876. It is held at a private collection.

== History and description ==
The painting was inspired by a poem of Giovanni Boccaccio, translated to English by Dante Gabriel Rossetti, "The Last Sight of Fiammetta", describing apparently the final moments of his beloved. Stillman used as model his stepdaughter, Lisa Stillman, aged only 11 years old, who had been previously her sitter for Mona Lisa (1875), shown at the Royal Academy, in 1875. This new painting was meant also for a Royal Academy exhibition, and was submitted in April 1876. The full catalogue title referenced Bocaccio's inspiration: "no. 757 / The last sight of Fiammetta / Above her garland and her golden hair / I saw a flame about Fiammetta's head. – Boccaccio."

Art critic W. M. Rossetti drew the highest praise for the painting: "one of the genuinely fine works of colour in the exhibition – warm, soft, pure flesh tints, admirably supported by the general colour scheme, the copper-yellow hair garlanded with red and pink roses, the charmingly-painted mandoline, the embowering foliage."

This painting seems to have been the major inspiration for Dante Gabriel Rossetti's depiction of his own A Vision of Fiammetta, much more flamboyant, to which he invited Marie Spartali Stillman herself to be the model, considering that his other choice, Janey Morris, was unavailable.

== Art market ==
The painting sold by £290,100 at an auction held at Bonhams, London, on 21 September 2022, well above the estimate of £70,000-100,000.
