= How the Virgin Mary Came to Brother Conrad of Offida and Laid Her Son in His Arms =

Painting by Marie Spartali Stillman

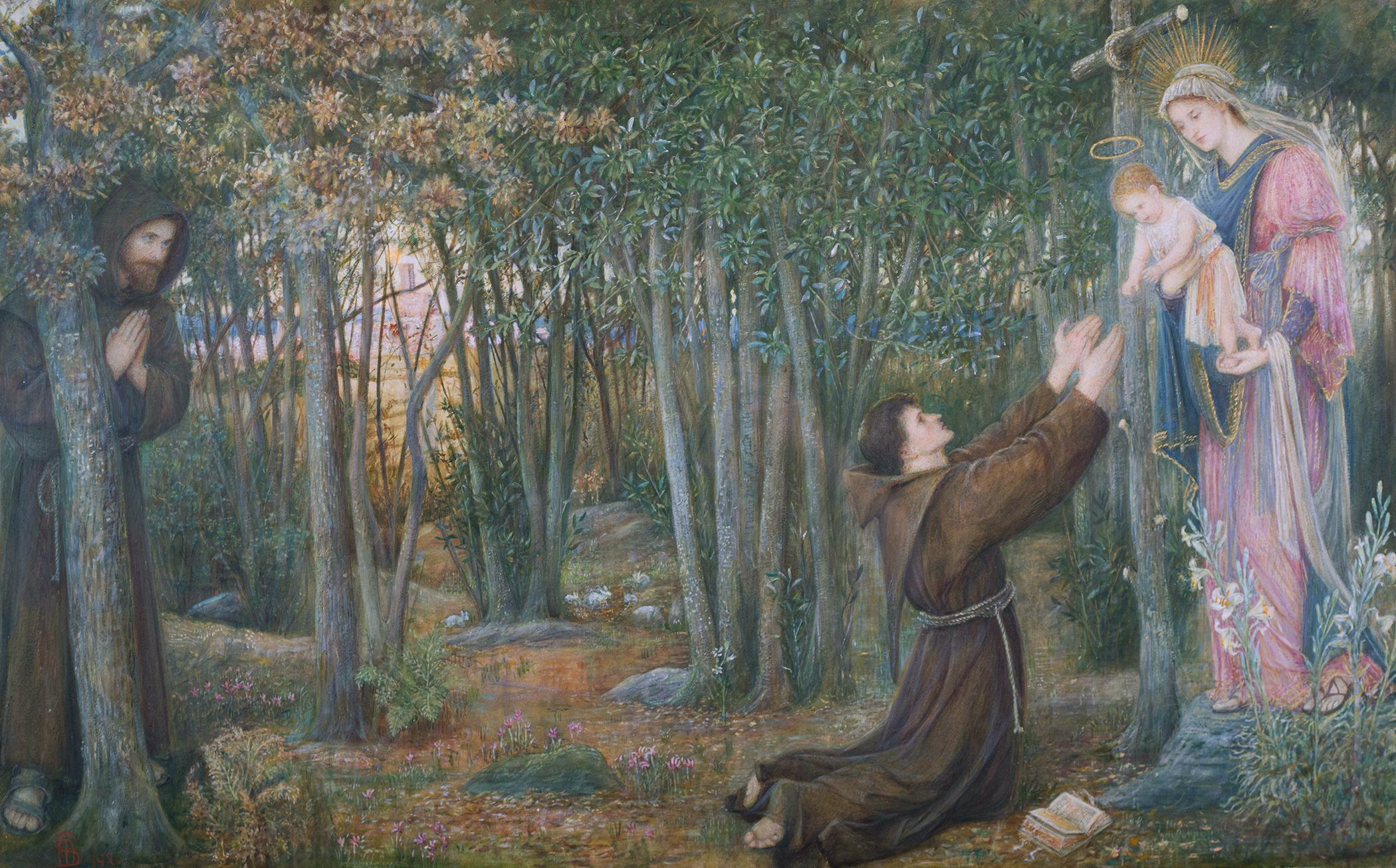
- Artist: Marie Spartali Stillman
- Year: 1892
- Type: watercolor, gouache and gum arabic on paper
- Dimensions: 68.2 cm × 98.5 cm (26.9 in × 38.8 in)
- Location: Wightwick Manor, Wightwick, Wolverhampton

How the Virgin Mary Came to Brother Conrad of Offida and Laid Her Son in His Arms is a watercolour, bodycolour and gold paint on paper painting by English painter Marie Spartali Stillman, from 1892. It is held at Wightwick Manor, in Wightwick, Wolverhampton, in the West Midlands, a part of the National Trust.

== History and description ==
Spartali created several paintings inspired by episodes from the lives of saints, like the current one, The Childhood of Saint Cecily (1892) and Saint Francis Blessing the Pigeons He Has Freed (1902). The painter was living in Rome at the time, and it seems to have been influenced by Renaissance, specially Florentine painting, for the current canvas. In particular, The Assassination of Saint Peter Martyr, by Giovanni Bellini, appears as an inspiration.

Spartali wrote and sent sketches to Edward Burne-Jones when she was working in this composition, asking him for advice. Burne-Jones gave her several advices, and said to her to send him "the tracings later on for final correction and warning". His painting, The Merciful Knight (1863), seems also to have been an inspiration.

The painting depicts the scene where the Italian saint, Conrad of Offida is having a vision of the Virgin Mary, who is appearing to him, while she offers His son to the hands of the kneeling monk. A book lies in the ground, possibly his breviary. In the place where the Virgin appears, several white lilies are seen, as symbols of her purity. A wooden cross is at the place of the apparition. The scene is located in a woodland, and another monk, Brother Paul, witnesses the scene, at the right, with his hands folded. The model for this monk was William Stillman, Spartali's husband. A landscape of Tuscany is seen at the distance, through the vegetation, with a tower visible.
