= Edith Sharpley =

English Lecturer

- Born: 24 January 1859; Louth, Lincolnshire
- Died: 14 April 1940 (aged 81)
- Education: Manchester High School; Newnham College
- Occupation: Classical scholar

Edith Sharpley (1859–1940) was a Classical Lecturer at Newnham College, Cambridge from 1884 to 1910.

== Life ==
Sharpley was the second of ten children born to Sarah McNicoll and Dr Thomas Sharpley in Louth in Lincolnshire. She was born on 24 January 1859 and went to several schools in Louth, Taunton and Paris before attending Manchester High School. She started at Newnham College in 1879, eleven years before her sister Mary McNicoll Sharpley in 1890.

Sharpley is the first student at Newnham who is recorded as having coxed a boat on the River Cam - in 1879. This was fifteen years before bicycles were permitted at Newnham. She took a first in part II of the Classical Tripos for which philosophy was her specialist subject. She then in 1884 became a lecturer in Classics at the college, focussing on teaching rather than research and writing. She was a lifelong correspondent of Eleanor Sidgwick and assisted Blanche Athena Clough in caring for her aunt Anne Clough who had been Newnham's first principal. Sharpley became vice principal of Sidgwick Hall in 1911 and was the first registrar of the roll of students from 1918–1929. One student wrote of "the fastidiousness of her taste and the ruthlessness of her judgement".

Sharpley was elected to Newnham's governing body from 1919 to 1922. She died on 14 April 1940.
