= Spartali & Co =

Spartali & Co was a Greek import/export company active in London, Liverpool, Manchester and Marseille, with its headquarters in the Anatolian city of Smyrna, in the second half of the 19th century. Along with several other Greek-owned merchant companies, it acted as a terminal and starting point for Greek middlemen and native dealers operating in the ports. Its principals were recorded in 1867 as Michael and Nicholas Spartali, Habib Giorgio Bustros, Habib Bustros, Fadlalla Bustros, Aburagi Bustros and Selim Bustros. Michael Spartali served as Greek consul-general to the United Kingdom from 1866 to 1882 and was the father of Marie Spartali Stillman, the Pre-Raphaelite artist and wife of William James Stillman.

In March 1879, December 1879 and May 1880 the company sold the British Museum three consignments of ancient Babylonian clay tablets inscribed with cuneiform records, including the Nabonidus Chronicle, as well as miscellaneous other ancient antiquities that had probably been excavated clandestinely in Ottoman-ruled Mesopotamia. The consignments were designated by the British Museum as the Spartali I, II and III collections respectively.

The company's British arm is recorded as having failed in 1884. By 1900, however, it had become the most important of the six leading rug dealers of Smyrna.
