= Say Not the Struggle Naught Availeth =

1855 poem by Arthur Hugh Clough

- by Arthur Hugh Clough
- Meter: Long metre
- Publication date: August 1855
- Lines: 16

Full text
- Say Not the Struggle Naught Availeth at Wikisource

"Say Not the Struggle Naught Availeth" is an English poem by Arthur Hugh Clough. It was written in 1849, and first published in The Crayon, an American art journal, in August 1855, under the title "The Struggle". Clough published the poem without a title in 1862. In The Poems and Prose Remains of Arthur Hugh Clough, 1869, the poem was titled "Say Not the Struggle Nought Availeth".

There was probably no specific event in the poet's mind, although the failed revolutions of 1848 and 1849 may have been an inspiration.

The last two stanzas were quoted by Winston Churchill in his "Report on the War" speech of April 27th 1941. Describing the lines as "appropriate to our fortunes tonight" he said "I believe they will be so judged wherever the English language is spoken or the flag of freedom flies."

== Text ==
Say not the struggle naught availeth,
The labour and the wounds are vain,
The enemy faints not, nor faileth,
And as things have been, they remain.

If hopes were dupes, fears may be liars;
It may be, in yon smoke conceal'd,
Your comrades chase e'en now the fliers,
And, but for you, possess the field.

For while the tired waves, vainly breaking,
Seem here no painful inch to gain,
Far back, through creeks and inlets making,
Comes silent, flooding in, the main.

And not by eastern windows only,
When daylight comes, comes in the light;
In front the sun climbs slow, how slowly!
But westward, look, the land is bright!
