= The Bothie of Toper-na-fuosich =

1848 poem by Arthur Hugh Clough

The Bothie of Toper-na-fuosich, subtitled "A Long-Vacation Pastoral" is a lengthy narrative poem by the Victorian poet Arthur Hugh Clough, which was critically well received at the time. The work was written in the summer of 1848. The poem follows its main character, Philip, as he departs from his Oxford companions who are studying in the Scottish Highlands, to pursue a life filled with love and adventure.
