= John Henry Haynes =

American archaeologist and photographer (1849–1910)

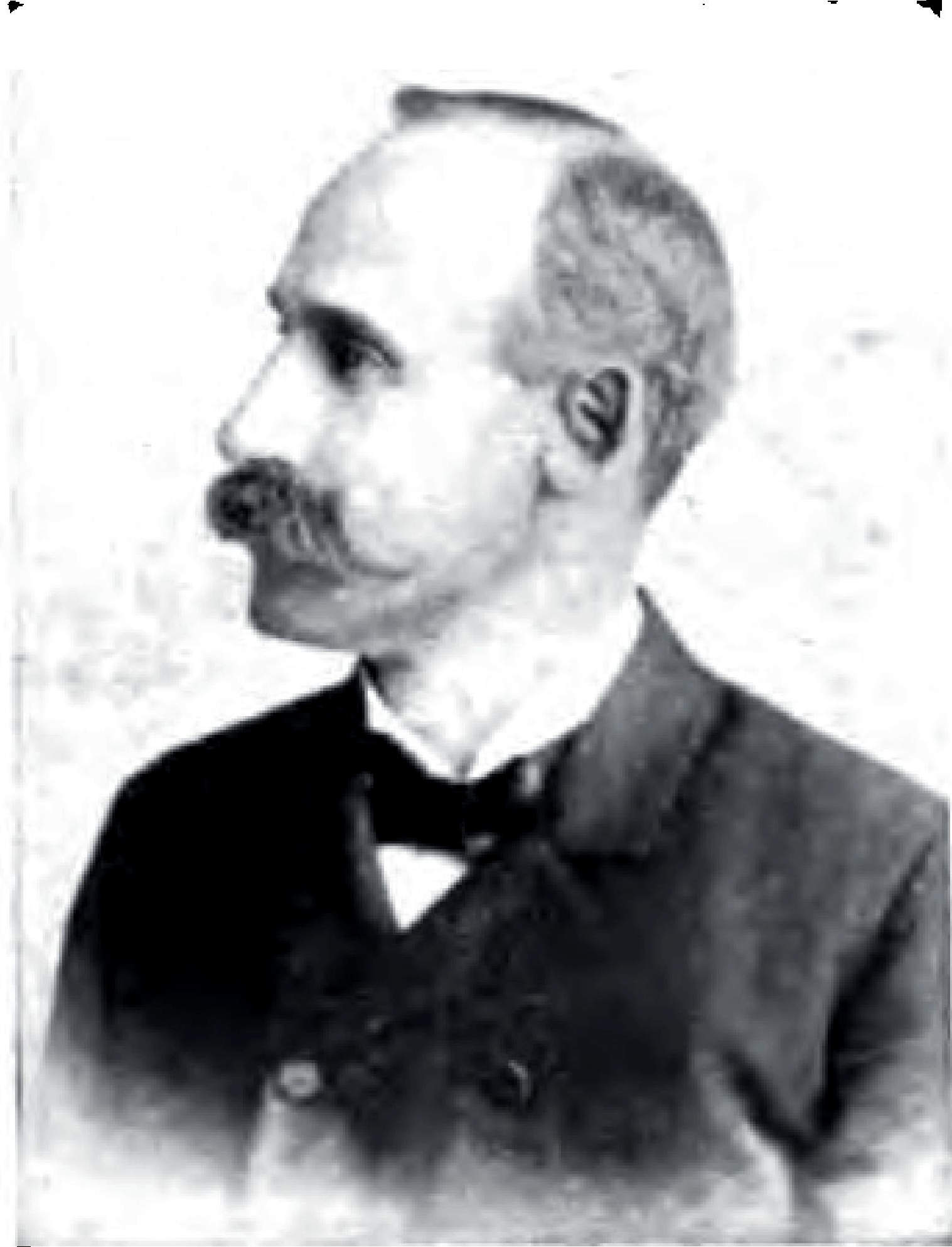
- John Henry Haynes (Copyright UPenn)

First American Consul in Baghdad
- In office 1888–1892

Personal details
- Born: 27 January 1849 Rowe, Massachusetts
- Died: 29 June 1910 (aged 61) North Adams, Massachusetts
- Spouse: Cassandria Artella Haynes

John Henry Haynes (27 January 1849 – 29 June 1910) was an American traveller, archaeologist and photographer, best known for his work at the first two American archaeological excavations in the Mediterranean, and Mesopotamia at Nippur and Assos. Haynes can be regarded as the father of American archaeological photography and his corpus remains an important record of numerous archaeological sites across Ottoman Anatolia.

== Family ==
John Henry Haynes was born in 1849 in Rowe, Massachusetts. He was the eldest son of John W. Haynes and Emily Taylor. Haynes' father died when he was still young, and he put off his education to care for his younger siblings.

== Education ==
In 1870, at the age of 21, Haynes enrolled in Drury Academy in North Adams. Two years later, he began his study of classics at Williams College in Williamstown. He worked his way through college, and following his graduation briefly held a position as a high school principal. In 1880, due to a chance encounter with Charles Eliot Norton, the first president of the American Institute of Archaeology, Haynes was offered a position on an archaeological expedition to Crete.

== Early career ==
Haynes's team was not able to secure a permit for the originally planned Crete expedition, and Haynes chose instead to travel to Athens. During his time there, he met photographer William J. Stillman and began working as his assistant. Following the completion of his project in Athens, Haynes joined an American archaeological excursion to Assos, where he worked under Joseph Thatcher Clarke as an archeological photographer. Despite being hired as a photographer for the project, Hayne's lack of equipment forced him to abandon photography during the 1881 dig season, and he instead became captivated by the archeological work. Following this unsuccessful first season, Haynes returned in the summer of 1882 better equipped, but this first season of archaeological work heavily influenced him, and he portrayed himself as an archaeologist for the rest of his career.

In between his early digs, Haynes elected to remain abroad, becoming a professor of English and Latin at one of the mission schools established in the Ottoman Empire, Robert College, and then later at Central Turkey College in Aintab.

== Journeys through Anatolia ==
Funded by the Archaeological Institute of America, Haynes and John Robert Sitlington Sterrett, who he had met during the expedition at Assos, spent the summer of 1884 documenting their travels through Anatolia. The two began at Aksehir, and traveled first to a Hittite shrine in Elflatunpinar and then to the Seljuk capital at Konya. From Konya, the two traveled across Cappadocia to Kayseri, visiting American missionaries at Talsa, then heading east toward Malatya. Finally, the two returned to Ankara, traveling back through Cappadocia and Boğazköy, taking almost 320 photographs. The photographs Haynes took on this expedition were the first taken of Elflatunpinar, and most likely at Konya as well. Haynes was able to document such sites as the Seljuk Kiosk, which has since been destroyed, as well as details of the Allaedin Kiubad Mosque that are no longer present. He was also able to capture photos of the İnce Minare Medresesi before its turret was destroyed.

While on his expeditions, Haynes was particularly fascinated by the region of Cappadocia. He took dozens of photographs at sites including the area around Selime and the Göreme, and Soğanlı Valleys. He believed that many of the rock formations he photographed in Selime had been dwellings of early Christians fleeing persecution, and he planned on publishing a book on the matter, which never came to fruition. Haynes photographs of this region were, however, published in a 1919 National Geographic article entitled "The Cone Dwellers of Asia Minor: A Primitive People Who Live in Nature-Made Apartment Houses Fashioned by Volcanic Violence and Trickling Streams". Unfortunately, this article, as with much of Haynes work, was credited to someone else, namely his partner Sterret, who claimed possession of many of the photographs following their expedition.

In 1887, Haynes set out on another expedition to Anatolia, funded by William R. Ware of Columbia University with the purpose of photographing archeological sites. Haynes revisited many of the cities from his first journey, and again provided us with invaluable documentation of sites long destroyed such as the "Thousand and One Churches" at Karadağ. Haynes produced a folio of this work in 1882, the only full copies of which are now housed at the Aga Khan Library at Harvard University.

== Work in Nippur ==
In 1884, Haynes's affiliation with the Archaeological Institute of America led him to become a part of the Wolfe expedition, a reconnaissance expedition to choose the site for what would become the Babylon Expedition Fund's first trip to the Near East. In October 1884, Haynes, together with his former partner John Sitlington Sterrett, William Hayes Ward, and Daniel Z. Noorian assembled in Mersin. From there, they traveled through Iraq, visiting Mardin, Mosul, and Erbil before stopping in Baghdad. The group returned in 1885 through Syria, continuing to probe sites in what was southern Mesopotamia before landing in Palmyra. Haynes continued to photograph while on this expedition, and Cornell University now possesses what they believe is the most complete collection of Haynes's Wolfe Expedition photographs.

In 1887, Haynes was appointed as the business manager and photographer for the University of Pennsylvania-affiliated dig at Nippur. During the first excavation season, he was accompanied by John Punnett Peters, who led the expedition, Perez Hastings Field, an architect, Daniel Noorian, who had worked with Haynes on the Wolfe Expedition, and two Assyriologists named Frank Harper and Herman V. Hilprecht. The first campaign ended in April 1889, mere months after the group arrived in Nippur, due to conflicts with local tribesman as well as clashes between Hilprecht and Peters.

In January 1890, Haynes returned to Nippur with Peters and Noorian, this time remaining for five months. Following this campaign, he returned to the site alone, acting as the director and for three years. In early 1899, Haynes returned to Nippur for one final season accompanied by his wife, Cassandra Artella Smith, and two young architects, Clarence S. Fisher and H. Valentine Geere. During this time Haynes also served as the first American consul to Baghdad from 1889 to 1892.

While in Nippur Haynes discovered somewhere around 17,000 cuneiform tablets dating from around 1749-1712 BCE, a collection which constitutes most of what we know of Sumerian Literature. This discovery, however, is often credited to Hilprecht, one of the original Assyriologists on the dig, who claimed to have "rescued" the site from Haynes's alleged incompetence.

These tablets, along with other artifacts collected from the digs at Nippur, reside at the University of Pennsylvania Museum of Archaeology and Anthropology in Philadelphia and in Istanbul.

== Retirement and death ==
Haynes left Nippur in 1900. He returned to Massachusetts, and in 1905 he had a mental breakdown and was institutionalized. His obituary of 27 June 1910 called him 'Broken in Body and Spirit.' He is buried in North Adams, Massachusetts, where his tombstone is a replica of the Black Obelisk of Shalmaneser III.

== Legacy ==
Haynes' career was largely ignored by the academic establishment until 2011, with the publication of John Henry Haynes. A Photographer and Archaeologist in the Ottoman Empire by Robert G. Ousterhout, Professor of Architectural History at the University of Pennsylvania. The Pera Museum in Istanbul and the University of Pennsylvania have also organized exhibitions of his photographs.

== See also ==
- Nippur
- Black Obelisk of Shalmaneser III
- American Institute of Archaeology
- William James Stillman
- John Robert Sitlington Sterrett
