= The Crayon =

The Crayon was a highly regarded American art magazine. It covered both US and international art, art gossip, exhibitions, literature, architecture and even landscape gardening. It was published from 1855 to 1861 with the final volume being Vol. 8, No. 7. It was published by W. J. Stillman and J. Durand, of New York. John Ruskin's aestheticism and his approach generally were pushed and Mott (cited in the Rossetti Archive) quotes the journal as promoting, the perception of the Highest Beauty and preference for that which is true and earnest. As well as Ruskin contributors included William Allingham, Charles Eliot Norton, and A.H. Clough.
