= William James Smythe =

British general

Williams James Smythe (1816–1887) was a general and colonel-commandant of the Royal Artillery and a Fellow of the Royal Society.

== Early life and military career ==
He was born at Coole Glebe, Carnmoney, County Antrim on 25 January 1816, the second son of Samuel Smythe, vicar of Carnmoney and his wife Margaret, daughter of John Owens of Tildarg. He was educated at Antrim until he entered the Royal Military Academy at Woolwich on 11 November 1830. He received a commission as second lieutenant in the Royal Artillery on 20 December 1833. In April 1835 he sailed for the Cape of Good Hope, where he served in the Kaffir War and received the war medal. He was promoted to be first lieutenant on 10 January 1837. He returned to England in October the same year.

In July 1839 Smythe became secretary of the Royal Artillery Institution at Woolwich, and filled the office until he embarked for Saint Helena in December 1811 to take charge of the observatory at Longwood, and to carry out magnetical and meteorological observations under the direction of Captain (afterwards General Sir) Edward Sabine. The results were published in two large quarto volumes of Observations brought out by Sabine in 1850 and 1860. Smythe was promoted to be second captain on 5 May 1845. He returned to England in February 1847.

In August 1848 Smythe embarked for Halifax, Nova Scotia where he was stationed for a year, returning to England in August 1849, on his promotion to the rank of first captain, dated 28 June. In January 1850 he was appointed by the Marquis of Anglesey to take charge of young officers of artillery on first joining at Woolwich, and to supervise their instruction. This new arrangement led to the establishment of the department of artillery studies, of which Smythe was the organiser, and became the first director until July 1852. He was promoted to be lieutenant-colonel on 1 April 1855.

== Royal Commission and marriage ==
Having a good knowledge of French and German, Smythe was selected in October 1854 to superintend the execution of contracts for arms in Belgium and Germany. While still holding this appointment he was withdrawn temporarily from its duties by Lord Panmure, in January 1856, to act as a member of the royal commission sent to France, Russia, Austria, and Italy, to report on the state of military education in those countries, and to consider the best mode of reorganising the system of training British officers of the scientific corps. The other commissioners were Lieutenant-colonel William Yolland and the Reverend William Lake (afterwards dean of Durham); its secretary was Arthur Hugh Clough. Smythe advocated the entire separation of the education of the Royal Artillery from that of the Royal Engineers, a plan which Yolland opposed. In the end the report was drawn up by Lake and the secretary, Smythe signing "for the history and descriptions of foreign military schools only". The report, in two blue-books, was presented to Parliament in 1857. It is a mine of information, and records the well-weighed opinions of a large number of the most thoughtful officers of the time in both corps. Smythe now returned to the superintendence of the foreign contracts for arms until July 1857.

He married, on 15 December 1857, at Carnmoney, Sarah Maria, second daughter of the Reverend Robert Wintringham Bland, JP There was no issue of the marriage.

He was promoted to be brevet colonel on 1 April 1858, and the same year was a second time appointed director of artillery studies at Woolwich. In 1859 he was made a member of the ordnance select committee.

== Fiji ==
In 1859 Smythe was selected to proceed to Fiji as commissioner to inquire into the circumstances of the cession of Fiji to England, which an English consul, Mr. W. T. Pritchard, had obtained from King Cakobau, and into the value of the group of islands from a strategical as well as a commercial point of view. The botanist, Dr. Berthold Carl Seemann, was attached to the mission. Smythe, accompanied by his wife, left England on 16 January 1860, taking with him complete sets of magnetical and meteorological instruments and charts. After experiencing some difficulty of transport owing to the war in New Zealand, he arrived in a small sailing vessel at Levuka on 5 July. He visited all the larger islands, and ascertained that there was no organised opposition to the cession; but he found that the representations made to government as to the value of the islands were in many substantial particulars incorrect, while Thakombau was in no sense king of Fiji. Foreseeing a tolerably long detention in the islands, Smythe brought with him to Levuka materials for a small house, which was erected, and part of it was fitted as an observatory. Here, from 12 Jan to 30 April 1861, he made regular magnetical and meteorological observations, including very careful determinations of magnetic declination, inclination, and force. Although not the first good observations made at Fiji, Smythe's are the most extensive and complete, and will probably long remain the standard of comparison.

On 1 May 1861 Smythe made his report from Fiji, giving his opinion that it was inexpedient to accept the cession made by Cakobau. He arrived home, via Panama, in November of the same year. His report was presented to parliament in 1862 and was approved. His wife wrote a pleasant account of the expedition in a series of letters to friends at home, which was published in 1864 as Ten Months in the Fiji Islands with coloured illustrations and maps. To it Smythe contributed the introduction, an account of an excursion to Namosi in Viti Levu, and the appendix, containing his instructions and report, together with his magnetical and meteorological observations and remarks upon the Melanesian mission.

== Promotion ==
On 5 August 1864 Smythe was promoted to be colonel in the Royal Artillery. The same year he was elected a fellow of the Royal Society, and was for some years a member of the meteorological committee of that society. In 1865 he went to India on military duty, returning to England on two years' leave of absence in the autumn of 1866. On 6 March 1868 he was promoted to be major-general, and returned to India in November. In December 1869 he finally came home, and lived at Tobarcooran at Carnmoney. He was promoted to be lieutenant-general on 1 October 1877, but remained unemployed. He was made a colonel-commandant of the Royal Artillery on 2 August 1880, and he was placed on the retired list, with the honorary rank of general, on 1 July 1881.

== Retirement and death ==
Smythe's latter years were chiefly given to an earnest advocacy of home rule for Ireland so far as it was compatible with union with Great Britain. It was his constant endeavour to promote the material development of his country. He took an interest in agriculture, and devoted himself to the study, and encouragement of the study, of the Irish language. He died at Carnmoney on 12 July 1887. He erected in the churchyard of Carnmoney a lofty Irish cross of mountain limestone, designed from the finest examples extant, and probably the most beautiful specimen of Irish ecclesiastical art in the country. His grave is at the foot of this cross. He left by his will the reversion of £3,000 to the Royal Irish Academy in trust, the interest of which was to be applied to the promotion of the use of the Irish language. He left also the reversion of an equal sum, together with his residuary estate, to the representative body of the church of Ireland. His widow survived him.
