= Madonna Pietra Degli Scrovigni =

Painting by Marie Spartali Stillman

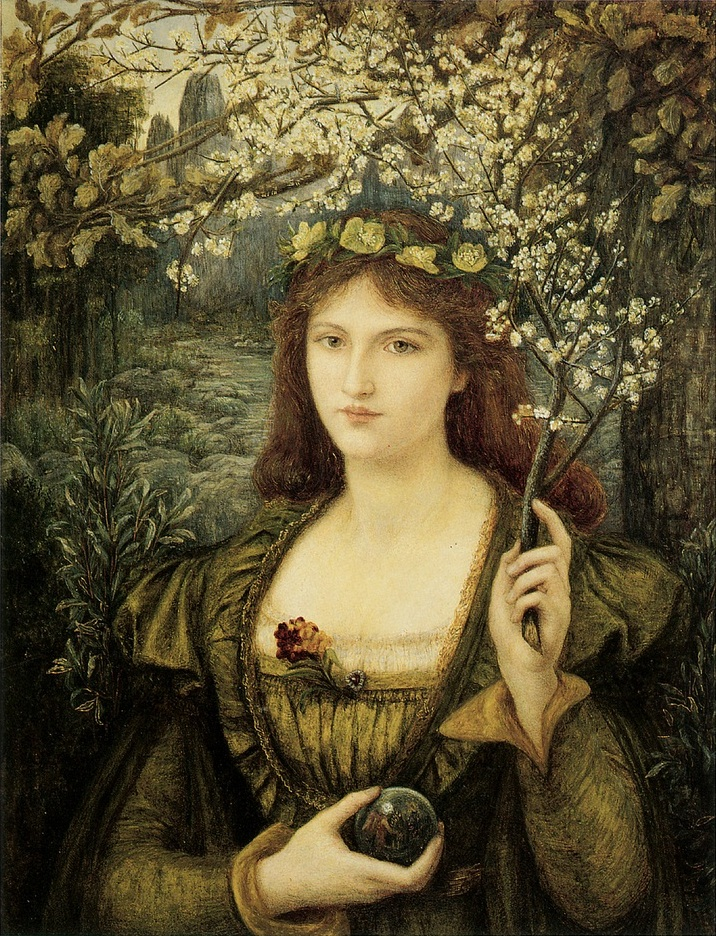
- Artist: Marie Spartali Stillman
- Year: 1884
- Type: watercolor, gouache and gum arabic on paper
- Dimensions: 77.1 cm × 58.1 cm (30.4 in × 22.9 in)
- Location: Walker Art Gallery, Liverpool

Madonna Pietra Degli Scrovigni (English: My Lady Stone) is a watercolour, gouache and gum arabic on paper painting by English painter Marie Spartali Stillman, from 1884. It is held at the Walker Art Gallery, in Liverpool.

== History and description ==
The painter took inspiration for this portrait in a poem by Dante Alighieri, describing a beautiful woman, who, despite the passions she can inspire, seems indifferent to that, in the poets words, she is "utterly frozen... no more moved than is the stone". The painting was possibly inspired by the fact that leading Pre-Raphaelite Brotherhood painter Dante Gabriel Rossetti had translated Dante's poem into English, and he was friends with Stillman. She in fact had been one of the models for his painting Dante's Dream, where she portrays one of the handmaidens, and this portrait is a possible tribute to him.

The lady of the painting, in accordance with the poem which inspired it, appears calm, looking gently to the viewer, while holding a branch with flowers. However she seems more ambiguous than its described in the poem. Stillman explained in a letter to the Walker Art Gallery that she had portrayed "just a lady clad in green in a green stony landscape that repeats her name." Walker Art Gallery website states that "The poem plays off the interaction of winter and summer, dark and light, yellow and green, themes which Stillman explores in this watercolour."

== Provenance ==
The painting was offered by the artist to the Walker Art Gallery in 1884.
