= The Enchanted Garden (painting) =

Painting by Marie Spartali Stillman

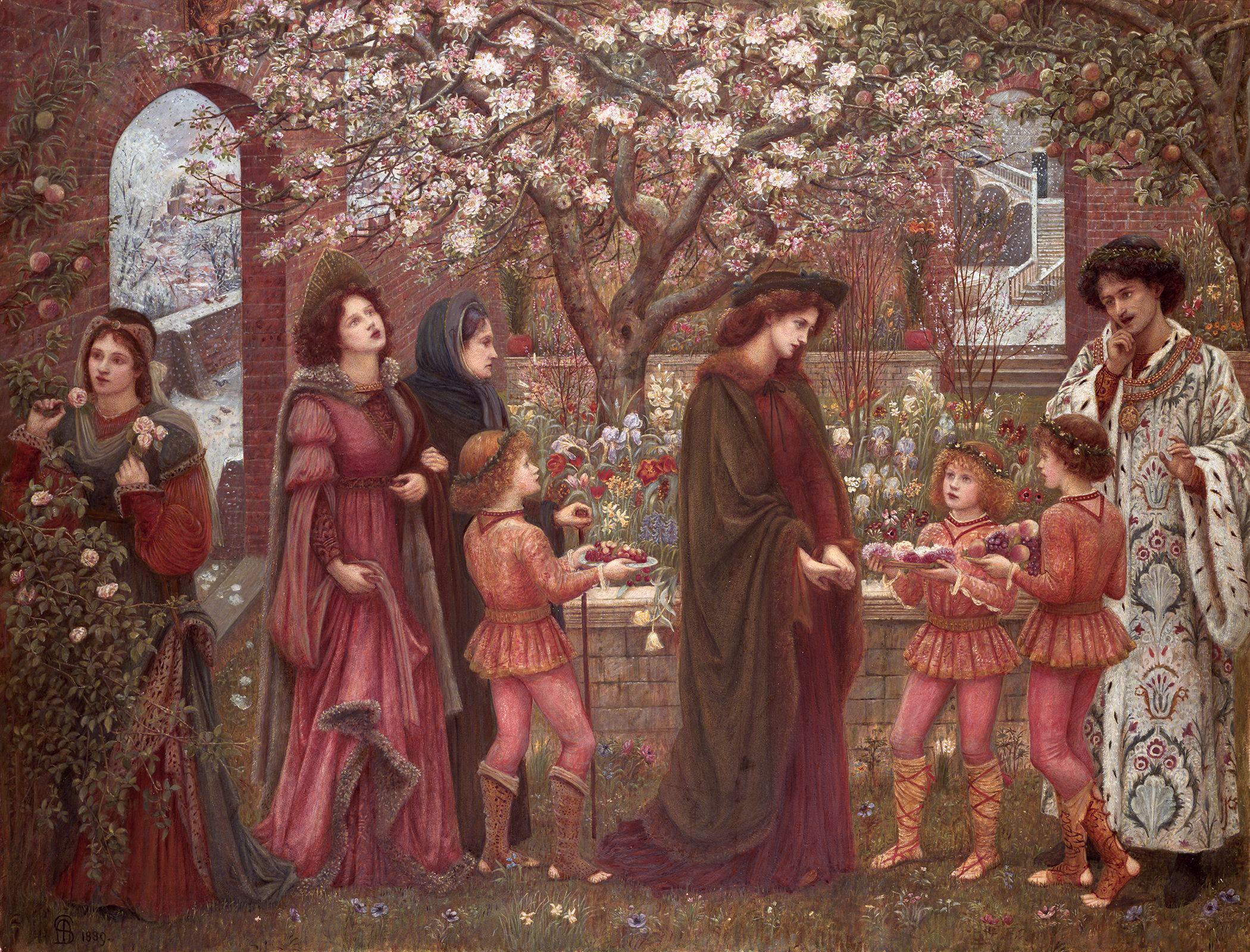
- Artist: Marie Spartali Stillman
- Year: 1889
- Type: pencil, watercolour and bodycolour heightened with gum arabic on paper
- Dimensions: 77.9 cm × 101.2 cm (30.7 in × 39.8 in)
- Location: Private collection

The Enchanted Garden is a painting on paper of 1889 in pencil, watercolour and heightened with bodycolour mixed with gum arabic by the English painter Marie Spartali Stillman. It is now in a private collection.

== History and description ==
Stillman created this painting in London, while in one of the most creative periods of her career. She took inspiration from the Italian literature of authors like Dante Alighieri, Petrarch and Boccaccio. Her interest in these authors came both from her friendship with Dante Gabriel Rossetti, one of the Pre-Raphaelite masters, and from her time living in Rome.

It was the fifth story of the tenth and final day in Boccaccio's work The Decameron that inspired her current painting. The story is about Messer Ansaldo, from Udine, who is in love with a virtuous married woman, Dianora, that tells him that she will accept his demands only if he is capable of creating "a garden full of green grass and flowers and flowering trees, just as if it were May", in the middle of winter. Ansaldo achieves this purpose, with the help of a necromancer, but fortunately for Dianora, understanding her feelings, he relieves her from the promise.

The painting details the moment when Ansaldo shows to Dianora that he was able to achieve the seemingly impossible task. He is at the right, while some children are presenting flowers and fruits from the garden fully in bloom to the disappointed Dianora. Her distraught look contrasts with the apparently more pleasantly surprised female companions. The garden contrasts with the snowy landscape, seen at the background. Art historian Jan Marsh states that Ansalso himself appears "somewhat abashed at the success of his deception", indicating that he might relieve Dianora from her promise.

== Art market ==
The work achieved the record price for one of Stillman's paintings, and also for a female Pre-Raphaelite painter, when it sold by £874,500 ($1,162,595), at Christie's London, on 10 December 2020, well above the pre-sale estimate of £300,000–500,000.
