= John Robert Sitlington Sterrett =

American classical scholar and archeologist

John Robert Sitlington Sterrett (1851 in Rockbridge Baths, Virginia —June 15, 1914) was an American classical scholar and archeologist. He was Professor of Greek at Cornell University from 1901. He was known for his expeditions, to present-day Turkey and other places in the Near East. Some of his work was illustrated by photographers by John Henry Haynes. He was elected to the American Philosophical Society in 1908.
