= Love's Messenger =

Painting by Marie Spartali Stillman

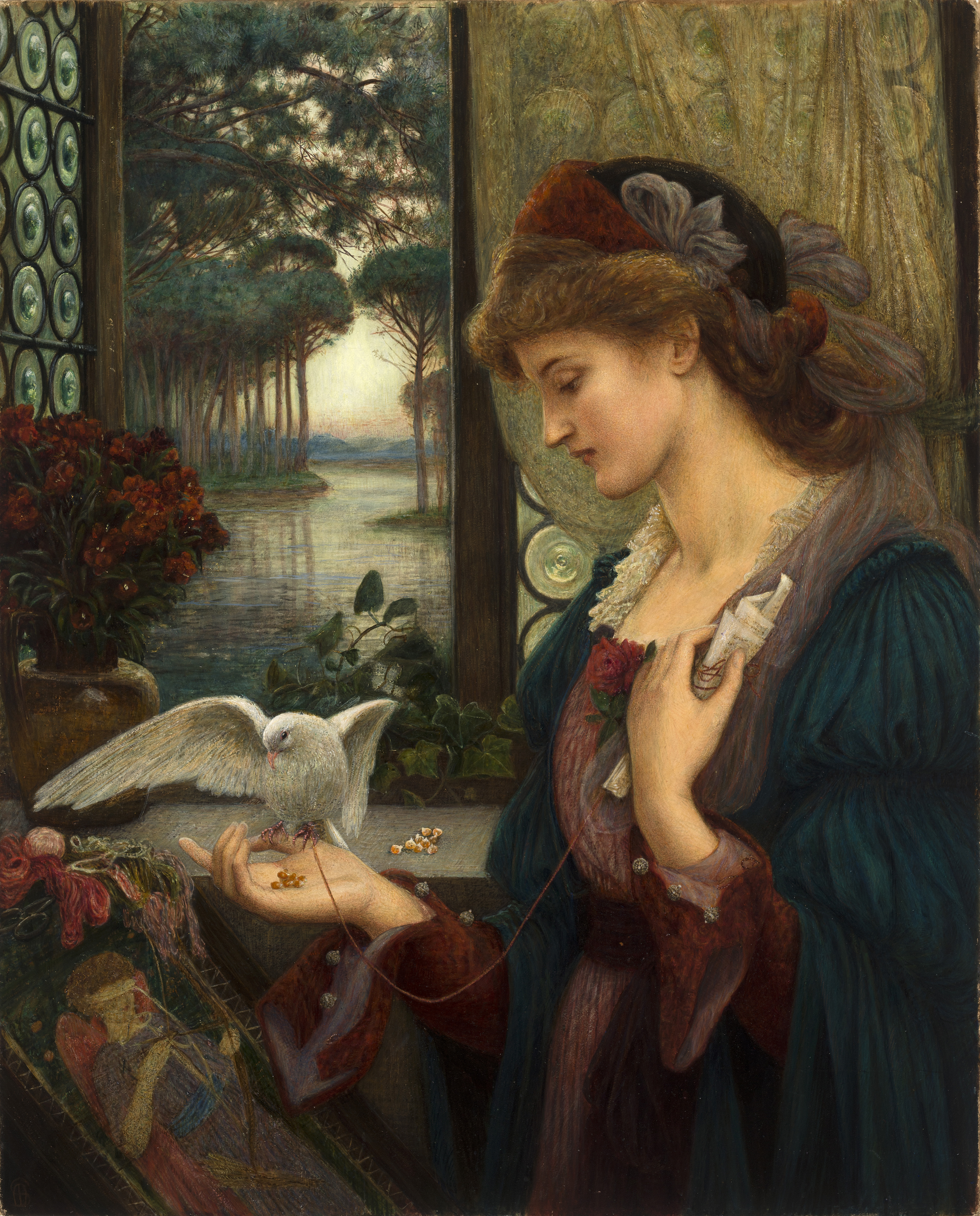
- Artist: Marie Spartali Stillman
- Year: 1885
- Type: watercolor basic
- Dimensions: 81.3 cm × 66 cm (32.0 in × 26 in)
- Location: Delaware Art Museum, Wilmington

Love's Messenger is an 1885 watercolor by Marie Spartali Stillman in which a dove has just carried a love letter to a woman standing in front of an open window. She wears a red rose, and has just put down her embroidery of a blind-folded Cupid.

The artist modestly described the painting in 1906:

I wish I could tell you something interesting about my pictures at Mr. Bancroft's [,] they are merely studies of heads done for the pleasure of painting. The effect of a fair head in a certain bull's eye window of a friend's studio where I was working one winter suggested Love's messenger - that is all... [Love's Messenger] is merely a study from a model. My daughter Effie who was then at school [was] not able to sit for me to complete it from her. I painted a landscape from the Villa Borghese Rome as the background when I made several changes in the picture while in Rome.

Critic Jan Marsh suggests that the studio with the bull's eye windows may have been in Edward Burne-Jones's house "The Grange" in Fulham.

The painting, paper mounted on wood, was purchased in 1901 by Samuel Bancroft and is now in the Delaware Art Museum.

== The painting ==
Love's Messenger reflects the influence of both early Pre-Raphaelite painting and Italian Renaissance painting. The symbols portrayed in the painting, including the dove, rose, ivy, and the blind-folded Cupid "suggest constancy, fidelity, and loveliness in full bloom," but also suggest "beauty on the cusp of decay, sensuality, and the pain Cupid's arrows may inflict." The presence of Venus is shown by the rose and the dove, so that the "scene may offer a contrast between the beauty, love, and abundance of Venus and the sensuality and unpredictability of her son Cupid."

== Provenance and exhibitions ==
The artist exhibited the painting at the Grosvenor Gallery in London in 1885. This gallery is considered to have been a crucial outlet for Stillman's works and Love's Messenger is considered one of the most important works she displayed there in the 1880s. Samuel Bancroft, Jr. purchased the painting in 1901 for £100, after seeing it at the house of the artist's daughter Effie (Euphrosyne) Stillman. It was then exhibited in Philadelphia (1901), before being donated to the Delaware Art Museum (then known as the Wilmington Society of the Fine Arts) in 1935. It has also been displayed in Washington (1977), Richmond (1982), and New Haven (1996).

== Sources ==
- Wildman, Stephen; Laurel Bradley; Deborah Cherry; John Christian; David B. Elliott; Betty Elzea; Margaretta Fredrick; Caroline Hannah; Jan Marsh; Gayle Seymour (2004). Waking Dreams, the Art of the Pre-Raphaelites from the Delaware Art Museum. Art Services International. p. 395. See, especially, pp. 262–263.
