= Marie Spartali Stillman =

English painter (1844–1927)

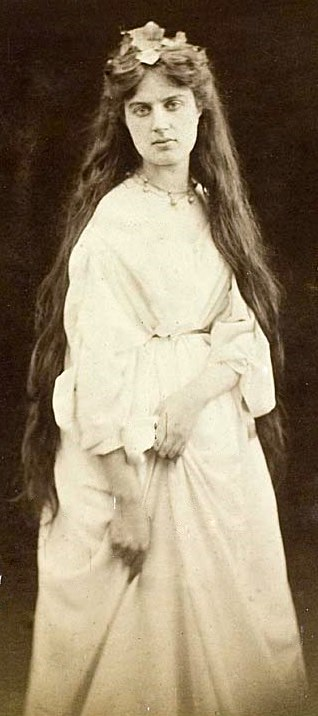
- Spartali in 1868, photograph by Julia Margaret Cameron
- Born: Marie Spartali; 10 March 1844; London, England
- Died: 6 March 1927 (aged 82); London, England
- Known for: Painter
- Spouse: William James Stillman

Marie Stillman (née Spartali; Greek: Μαρία Σπαρτάλη; 10 March 1844 – 6 March 1927) was a British painter. A member of the second generation of the Pre-Raphaelite Brotherhood, she is regarded as the greatest female artist of that movement.

She had one of the longest-running careers of the Pre-Raphaelites, spanning sixty years and producing over one hundred and fifty works, including Love's Messenger and romantic scenes from the Divine Comedy. Though her work with the Brotherhood began as a model, she trained and became a painter, earning praise from Dante Gabriel Rossetti and others.

== Early life ==
Spartali was the eldest child of Michael Spartali, a wealthy merchant, principal of the firm Spartali & Co and Greek consul-general based in London from 1866 to 1879. Michael had moved to London around 1828, where he married Euphrosyne Varsini, the daughter of a Greek merchant from Genoa. Spartali was of Greek descent. The family split time between their home at Clapham Common in London and their country home on the Isle of Wight. In the city, Spartali's father was fond of lavish garden parties where he invited up and coming writers and artists. It was at one such event where Marie would first be introduced to the art world.

== Marriage and death ==
In 1870, Spartali met American journalist and painter William J. Stillman. The couple had previously posed for Rossetti in his famous Dante pictures, though it is not certain if that is how they first met. Interestingly, although her husband was an artist himself, Marie never sat for him as a model. The pair married in 1871 against her father's wishes, causing a rift that would never fully heal.

As her husband was a foreign correspondent for The Times, the couple divided their time between London and Florence (1878–83), and later Rome (1889–96).

The couple had three children of their own who were raised alongside William's other three children from a previous marriage. Marie Stillman died in March 1927 in Ashburn Place in South Kensington, four days shy of her 83rd birthday, and was cremated at Brookwood Cemetery, near Woking, Surrey. She is interred there with her husband.

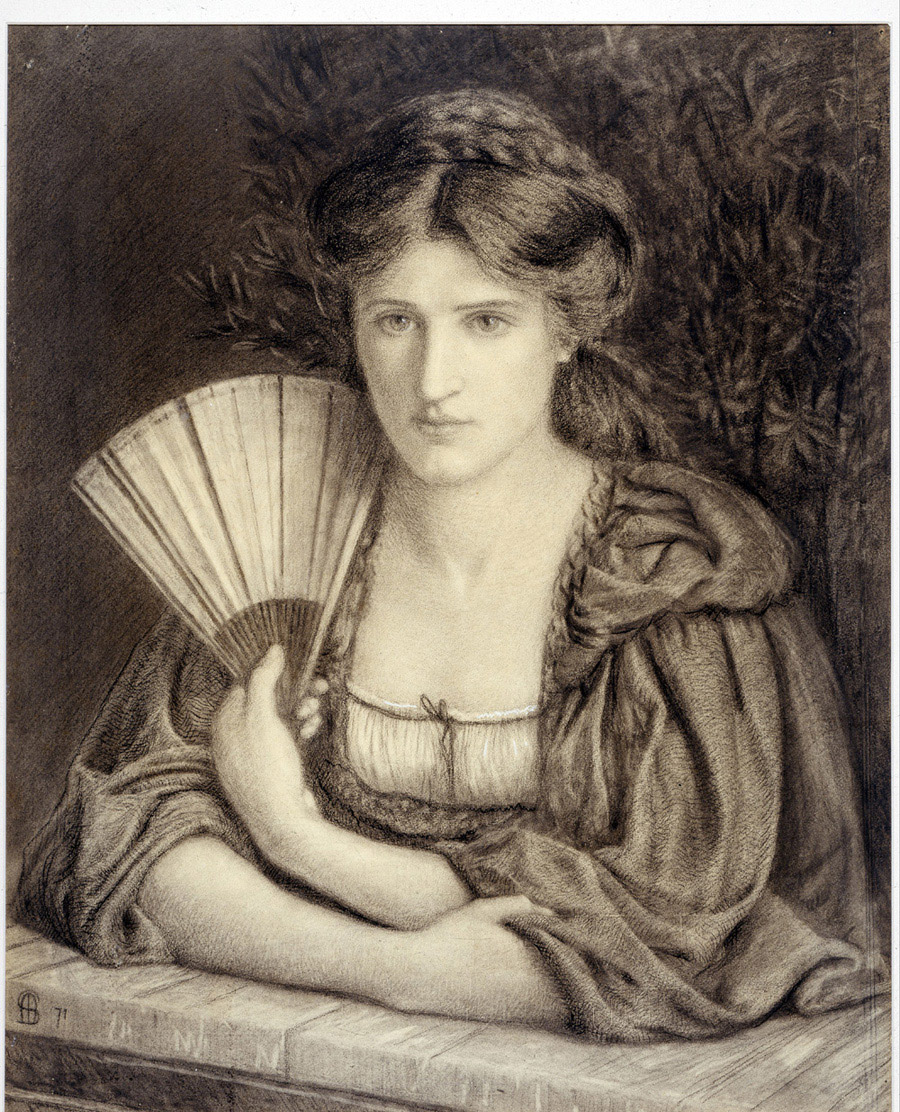
Self-Portrait, 1871, Delaware Art Museum.

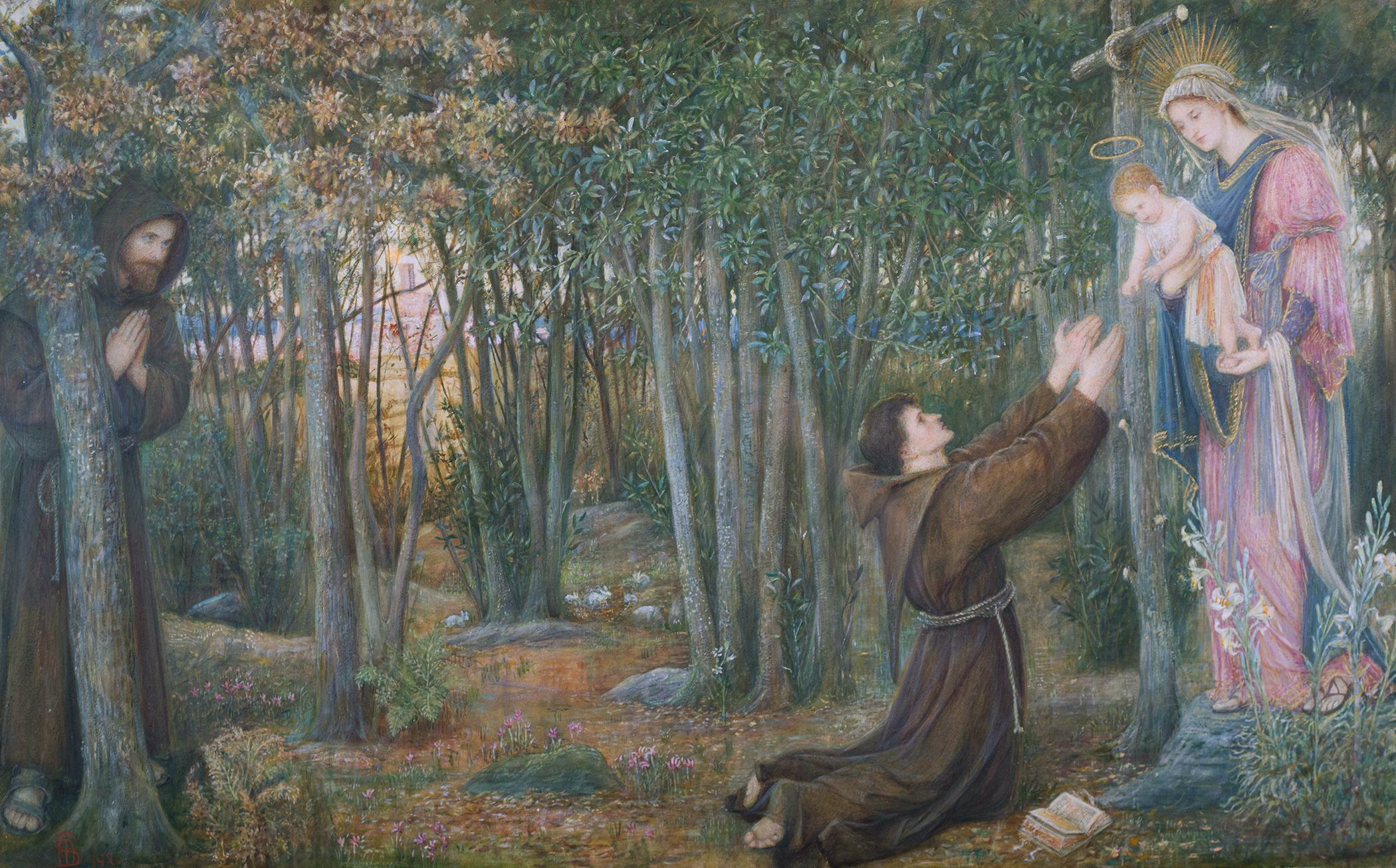
How the Virgin Mary Came to Brother Conrad of Offida and Laid Her Son in His Arms, 1892. Watercolour, gouache, and gold paint on paper.

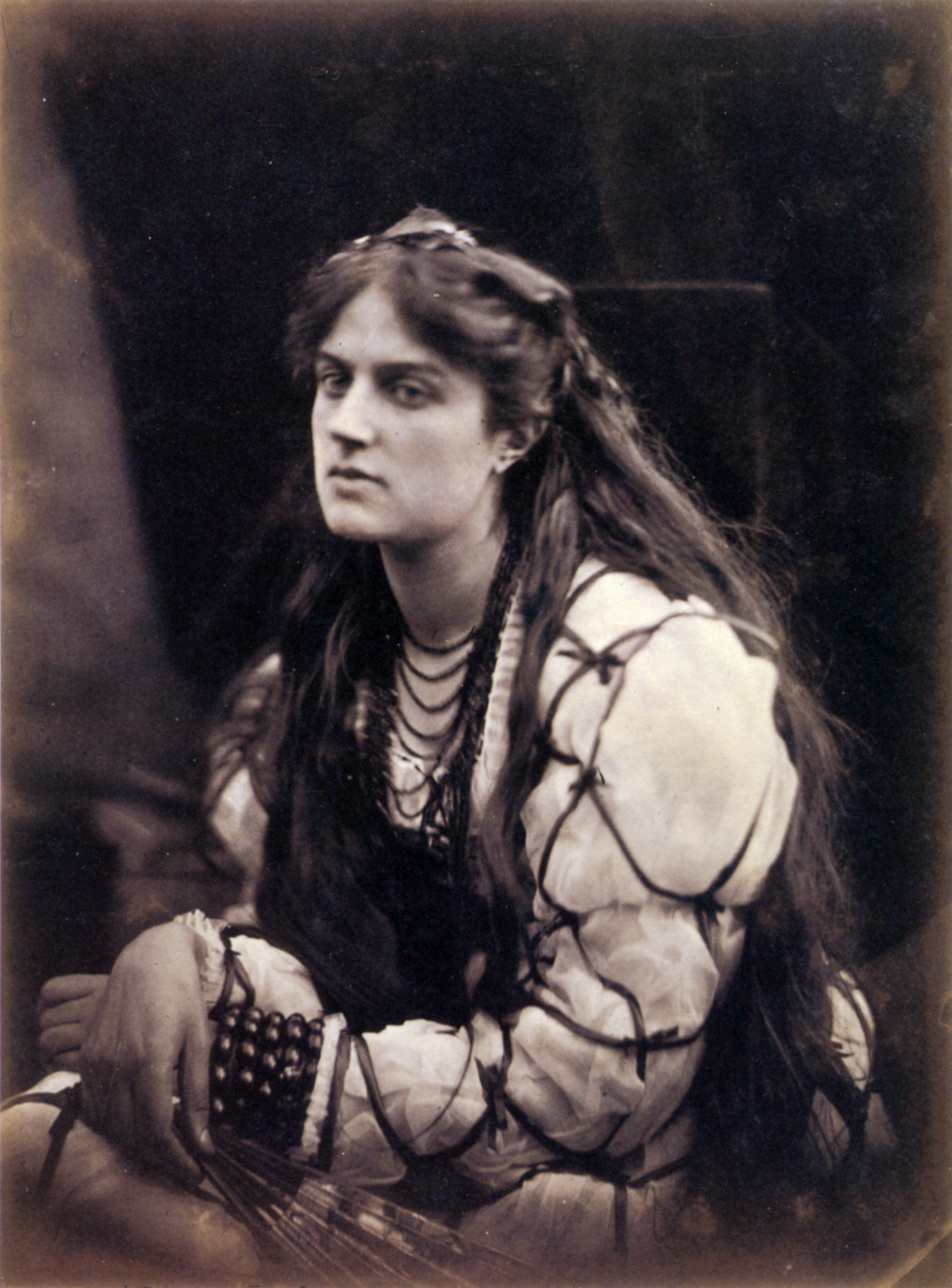
Hypatia, Spartali as model. Originally from the J. Paul Getty Museum, Los Angeles.

== Art and career ==
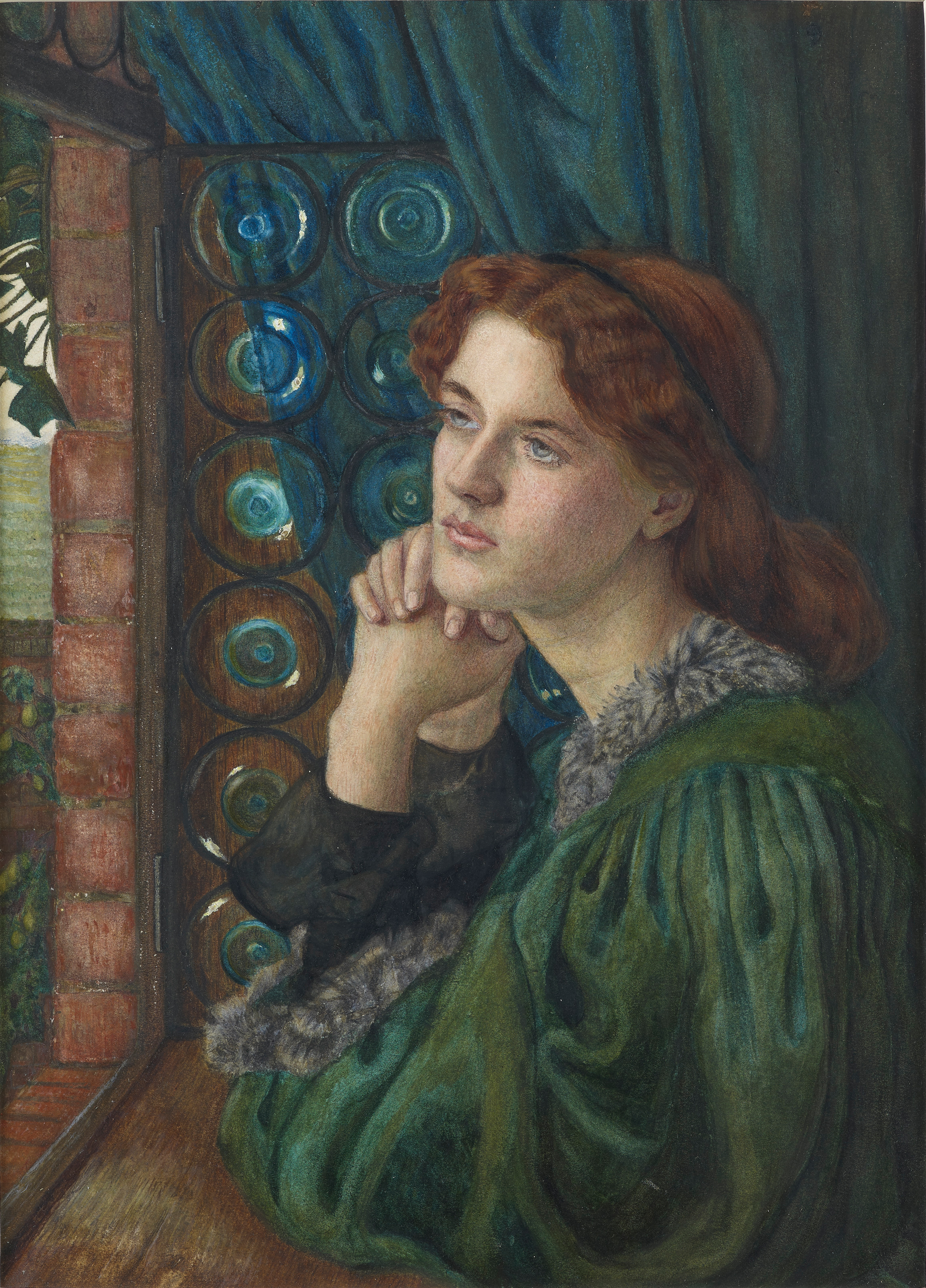
Mariana (1867–1869)

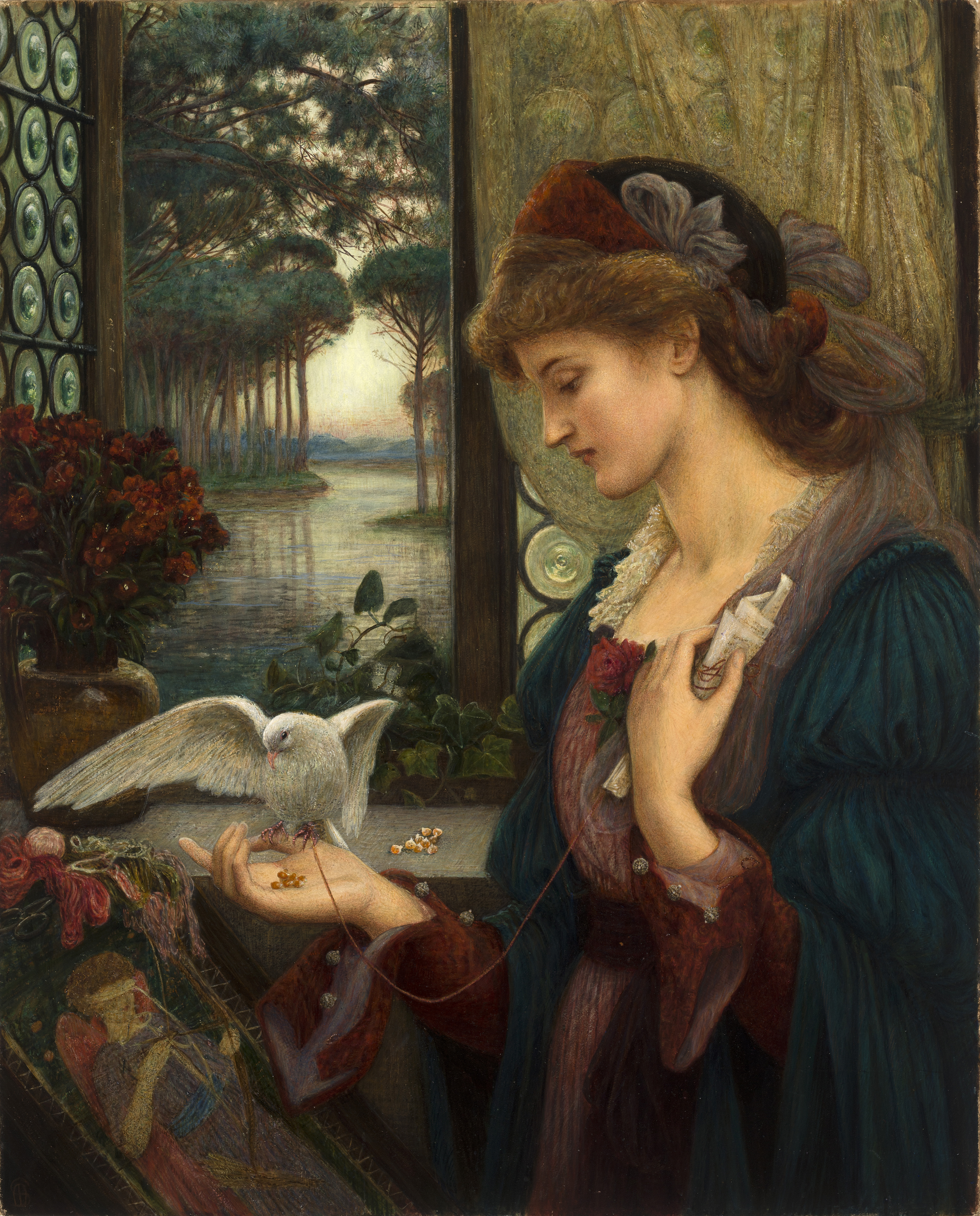
Love's Messenger, 1885, exhibited in the Delaware Art Museum

=== Introduction to the Art World ===
Known for their Greek heritage and beauty, Spartali along with her cousins, Maria Zambaco and Aglaia Coronio, were known collectively among friends as "the Three Graces," after the Charites of Greek mythology (Aglaia, Euphrosyne and Thalia). Marie was very tall, and cut an imposing figure—in her later years dressing entirely in black and purposefully attracting much attention throughout her life.

In the house of the Greek businessman A.C. Ionides at Tulse Hill, in south London, Marie first met the artist James McNeill Whistler and playwright Algernon Charles Swinburne. The meeting made quite the impression, for Swinburne was reported to have said that "She is so beautiful that I want to sit down and cry". Her equally striking sister Christina Spartali was the model for Whistler's painting The Princess from the Land of Porcelain (1863–1865).

=== The Pre-Raphaelites ===
In 1864, Whistler introduced Spartali to the Pre-Raphaelite artist Dante Gabriel Rossetti. She began sitting for him and when Spartali expressed interest in learning to paint he referred her to Ford Madox Brown. Over the next five years the pair developed a close, almost familial, relationship. Of his models, Brown said that Spartali was "the most intellectual", and maintained a deep respect for her work, chronicled in their correspondence. By 1870, Spartali had decided to pursue art professionally and with the help of her mentor made her first sale for 40 guineas.

Example of modeling works: Brown; Burne-Jones (The Mill); Julia Margaret Cameron; Rossetti (A Vision of Fiammetta, Dante's Dream at the Time of the Death of Beatrice, The Bower Meadow); and Spencer Stanhope.

=== Style ===
Because of her close links to the Brotherhood, Marie Stillman is often identified as part of the second generation of the movement. According to Henry James, "She inherited the traditions and the temper of the original PRs...but she has come into her heritage by virtue or natural relationship. She is a spontaneous, sincere, naive Pre-Raphaelite".

There is, however, some academic debate as to whether this is entirely accurate. For example, Robert de la Sizeranne of Le Correspondant noted that this new generation of Pre-Raphaelites, Marie Stillman among them, had enough in common with the Symbolists to be considered one. Marie Spartali Stillman, could be considered a candidate for Symbolism because her figures "... have an immobility, a silence, a pose almost suspended, a slow hesitation in their rare movements, which make them resemble something like sleepwalkers". Rossetti himself credited Spartali for her ability to infuse her figures with emotion, thereby elevating them to something more than mere images.

==== Other influences and career impacts ====
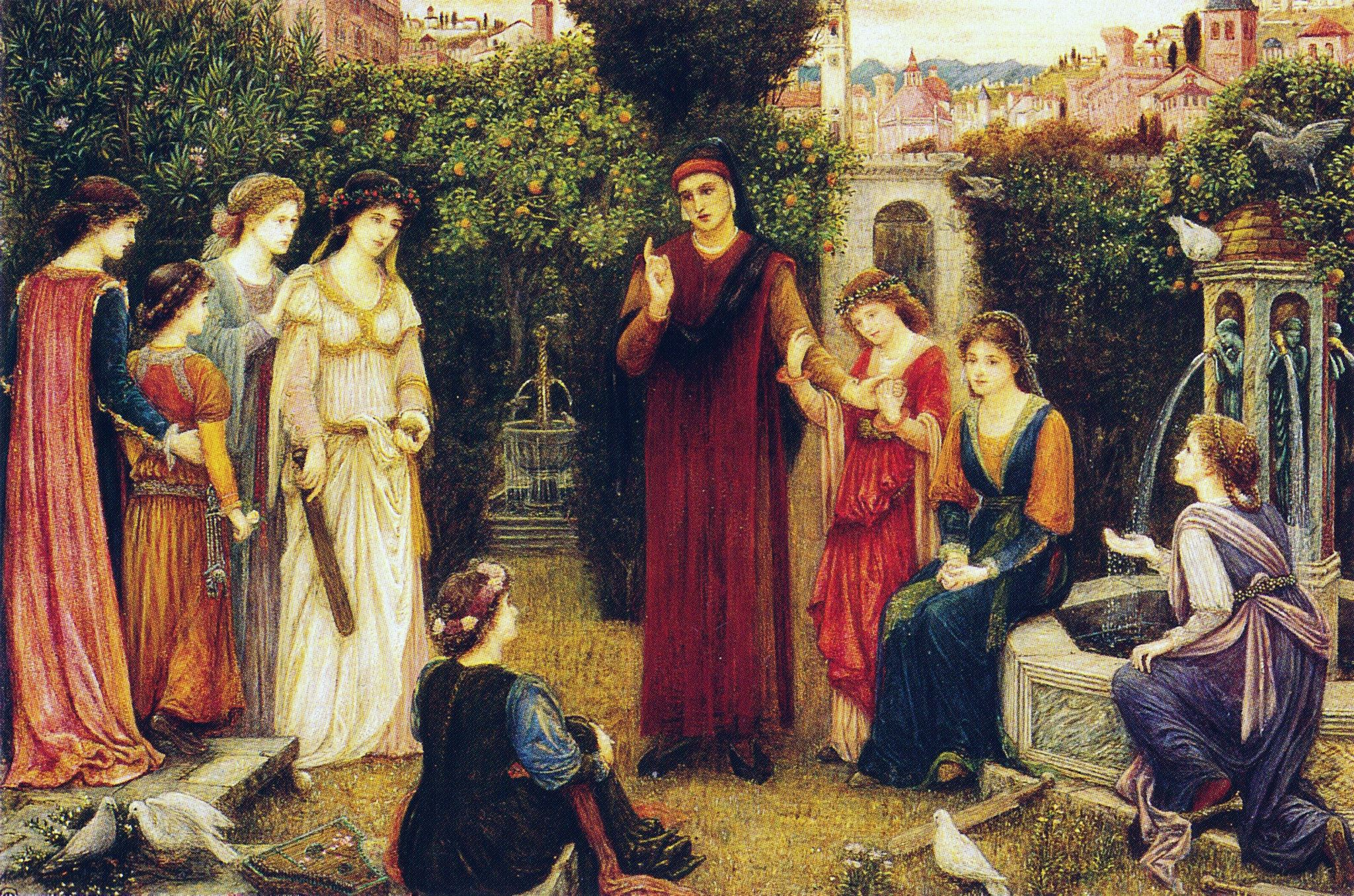
Dante at Verona (1888)

In 1873 both her young daughter, Euphrosyne, and her sister Christina fell ill. Stillman wrote to Ford Madox Brown that she was preoccupied with their health and felt "too weak to paint." She later clarified that whenever she did work she found herself depicting her sister in a grim state. Because of this, she took some time off painting, however Madox-Brown always speculated that she stopped because of her husband's jealousy over her successful career and continued relationship with himself.

Alongside her husband, Stillman lived in Florence, Italy for a number of years. She took great inspiration from the city around her which can be seen most prominently in her subject matter. Being in the city of Dante Alighieri, she depicted numerous scenes from the Divine Comedy, focusing in particular on the romance between Dante and Beatrice.

Though separated from her peers, Stillman maintained her correspondence with the PRB and Rossetti in particular who shared her love of Dante.

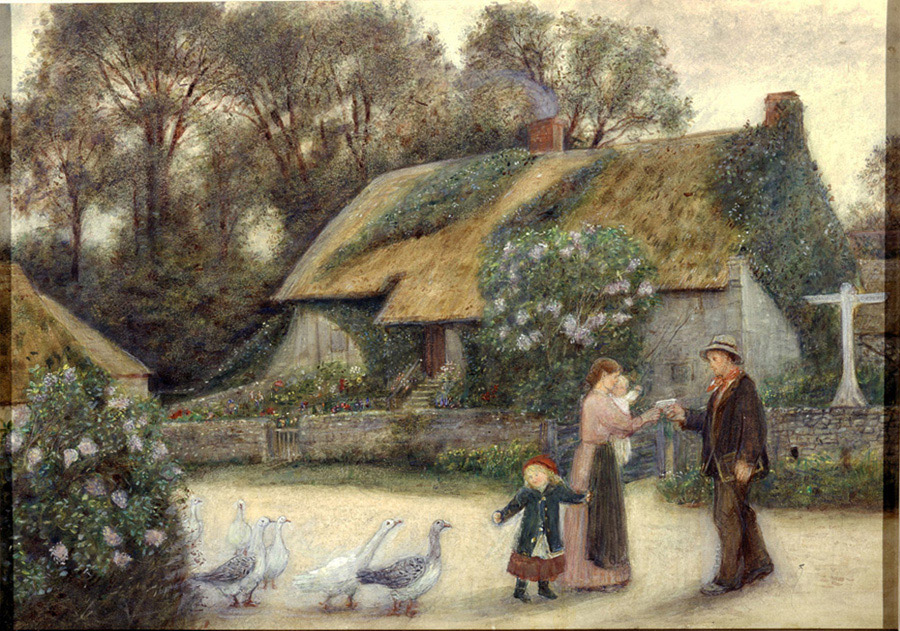
Farm Scene

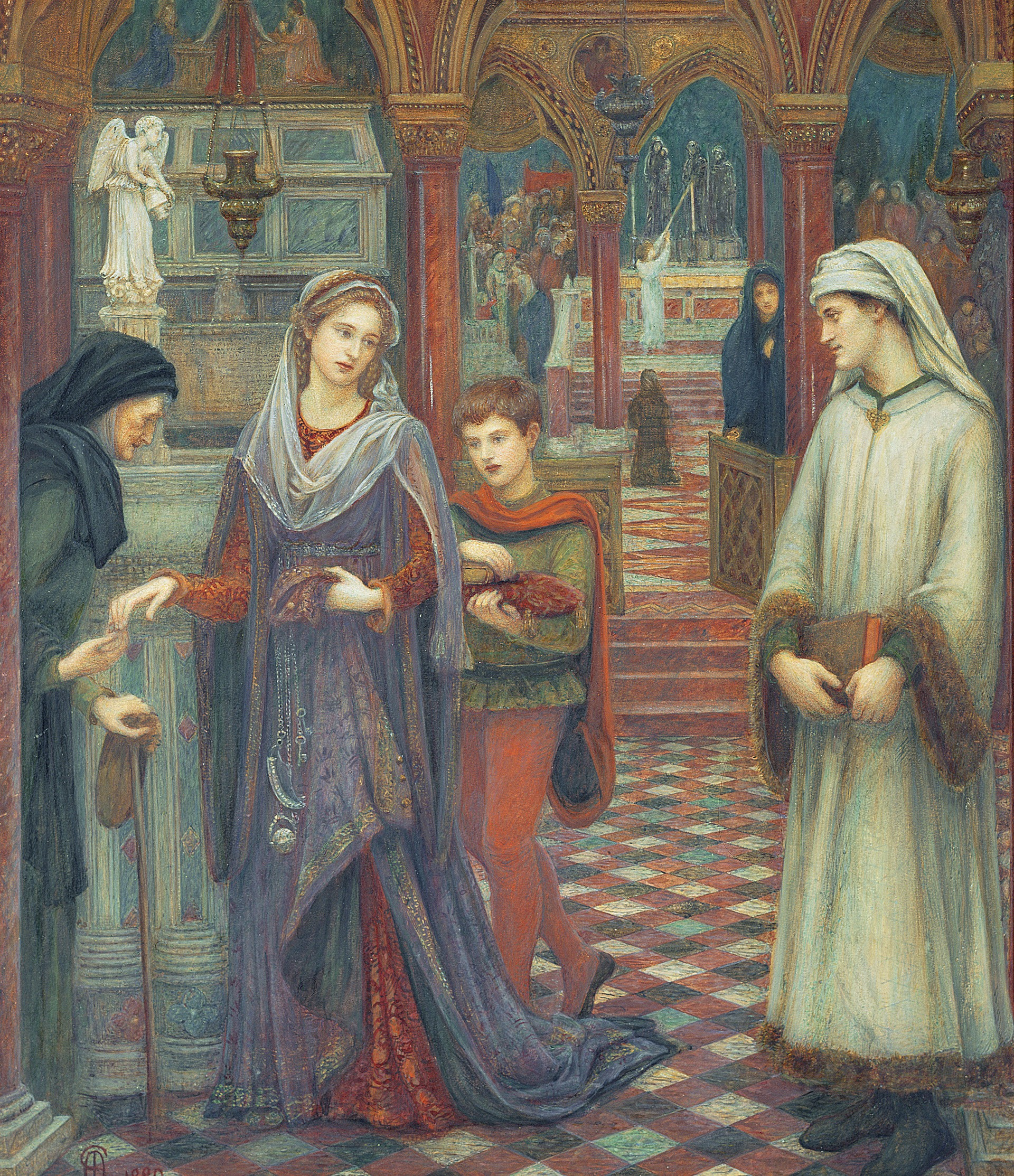
First Meeting of Petrarch and Laura (Church of Santa Chiara at Avignon), 1889

=== Exhibitions ===
The subjects of her paintings were typical of the Pre-Raphaelites: female figures; scenes from Shakespeare, Petrarch, Dante and Boccaccio; also Italian landscapes. She exhibited at the Dudley Gallery in 1875, then at the Grosvenor Gallery and its successor, the New Gallery; at the Royal Academy; and at various galleries in the eastern USA, including the Centennial Exhibition in Philadelphia in 1876. Stillman exhibited her work at the Palace of Fine Arts at the 1893 World's Columbian Exposition in Chicago, Illinois.

A retrospective show of her work took place in the United States in 1982, and another one at the Delaware Art Museum in 2015. The latter show transferred to the UK, opening at the Watts Gallery at Compton, Surrey from March until 5 June 2016.

== Art market ==
The record for her best-selling painting, and for a Pre-Raphaelite female painter, was established when The Enchanted Garden (1889) sold for £874,500 ($1,162,595) at Christie's London, on 10 December 2020.

== Commemoration ==
In January 2023, English Heritage announced that a blue plaque would be unveiled later that year on a house in Clapham, where she took her first steps in becoming an artist. The plaque was installed in April 2023 at The Shrubbery, 2 Lavender Gardens, Clapham, her family home when she was a young woman and where she later painted and prepared for exhibitions.

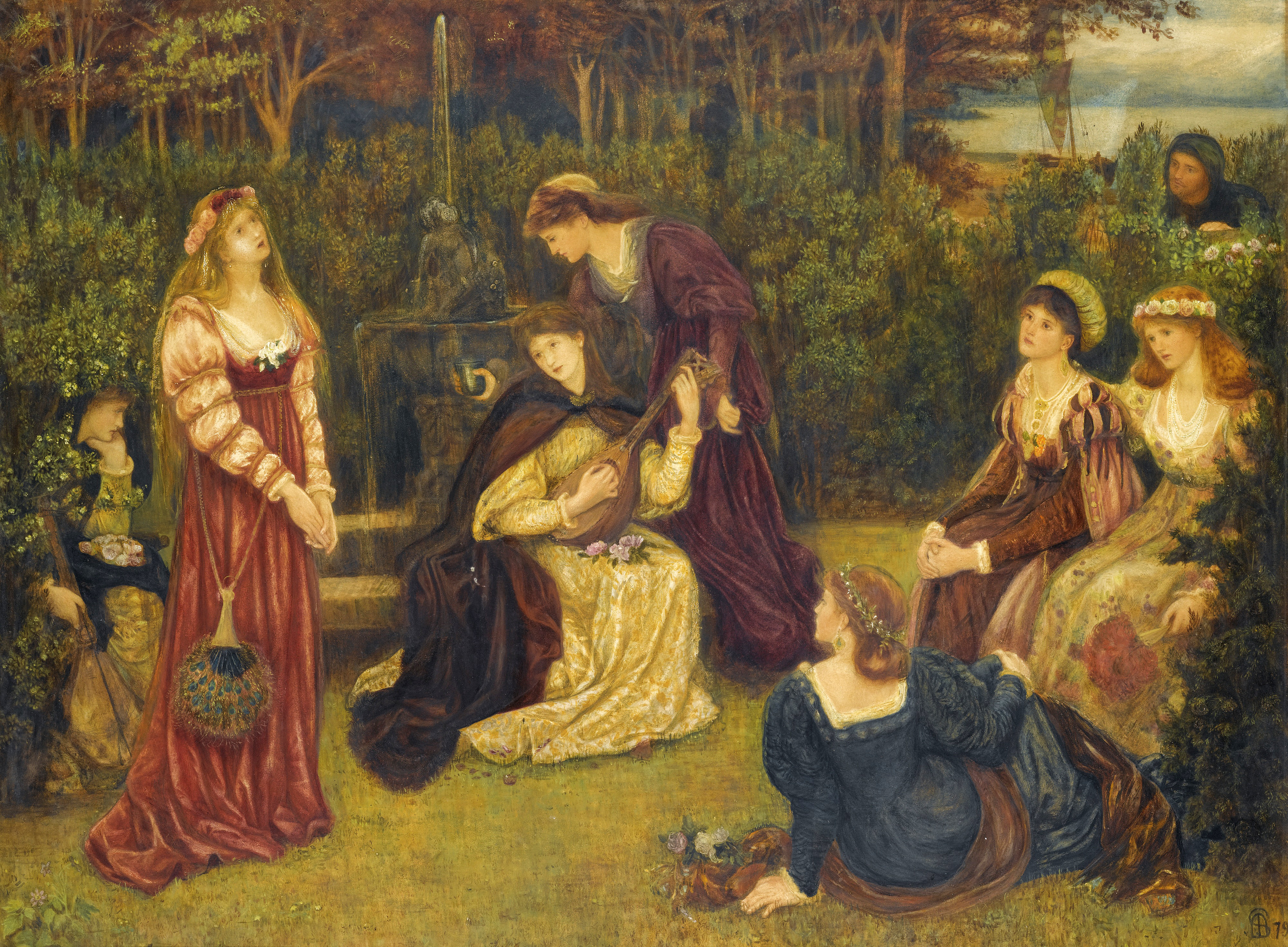
Fiammetta Singing, 1879

== Works (incomplete) ==
David Elliott lists more than 170 works in his book. The following are the better-known works, as determined by their mention in other books which discuss the artist.

- The Lady Prays – Desire (1867; Lord Lloyd-Webber Collection)
- Mariana (c.1867–1869; Private collection)
- Portrait of a young woman (1868)
- Forgetfulness (1869; Private collection)
- La Pensierosa (1870; Chazen Museum of Art, University of Wisconsin–Madison)
- Self-Portrait (1871; Delaware Art Museum)
- Self-Portrait in Medieval Dress (1874)
- Portrait of Effie Holding a Lily and a Rose Posy in an English Garden (1876)
- The Last Sight of Fiammetta (c. 1876)
- Gathering Orange Blossoms (1879; St. Lawrence University)
- The Meeting of Dante and Beatrice on All Saints' Day (1881)
- Madonna Pietra Degli Scrovigni (1884; Walker Art Gallery, Liverpool)
- Love's Messenger (1885; Delaware Art Museum)
- A Florentine Lily (c.1885–1890; Private collection)
- The May Feast at the House of Folco Portinari, 1274 (1887)
- Dante at Verona (1888; Private collection)
- Upon a Day Came Sorrow unto Me (1888)
- A Wreath of Roses (1888)
- A Florentine Lily (c.1885–1890)
- A Florentine Wedding Feast (1890)
- The Enchanted Garden, also known as Messer Ansaldo showing Madonna Dionara his Enchanted Garden (1889) – This illustrates a tale from The Decameron
- Convent Lily (1891)
- Cloister Lilies (1891; Ashmolean Museum, Oxford)
- Dante and Beatrice, Scene from the Vita Nuova (1891)
- Saint George (1892; Delaware Art Museum)

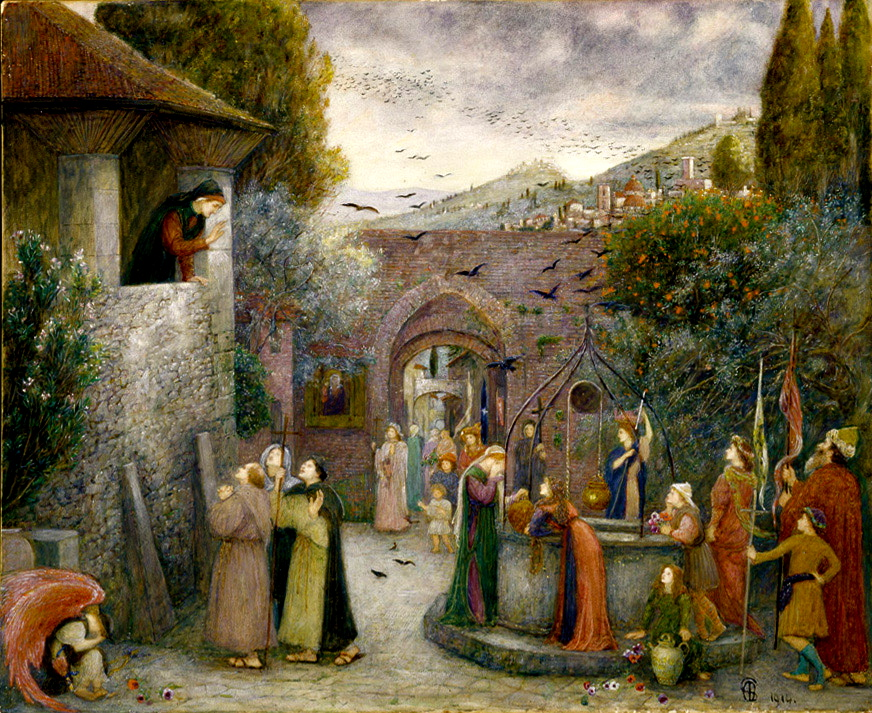
The Pilgrim Folk, 1914

- How the Virgin Mary Came to Brother Conrad of Offida and Laid Her Son in His Arms (1892; Wightwick Manor, National Trust, UK)
- A Rose from Armida's Garden (1894)
- Love Sonnets (1894; Delaware Art Museum)
- Beatrice (1896; Delaware Art Museum)
- Portrait of Mrs W. St Clair Baddeley (1896)
- Beatrice (1898; Private collection)
- The Pilgrim Folk (1914; Delaware Art Museum)

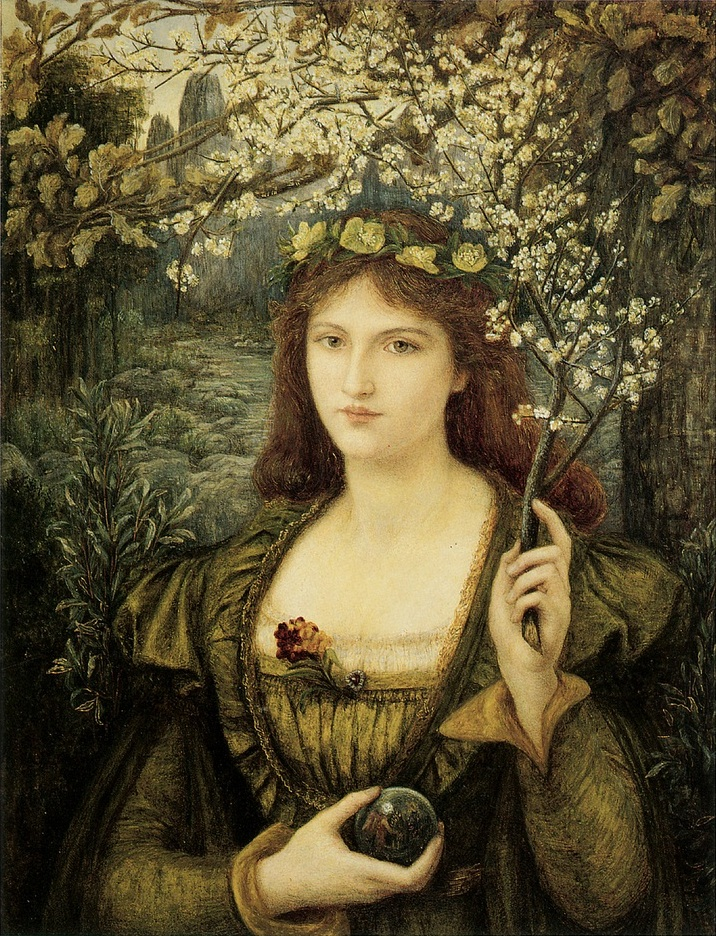
Madonna Pietra Degli Scrovigni, 1884

== Notes ==
- Dyson, Stephen L. (2014). The LAST AMATEUR The Life of William J. Stillman. New York: State University of New York.
- Marsh, Jan; Pamela Gerrish Nunn (1998). Pre-Raphaelite Women Artists. London: Thames and Hudson. pp. 131–135. ISBN 0-500-28104-1.
- Stillman, William James (1901). Autobiography of a Journalist. London: Grant Richards.
