= Maria d'Aquino =

Neapolitan noblewoman

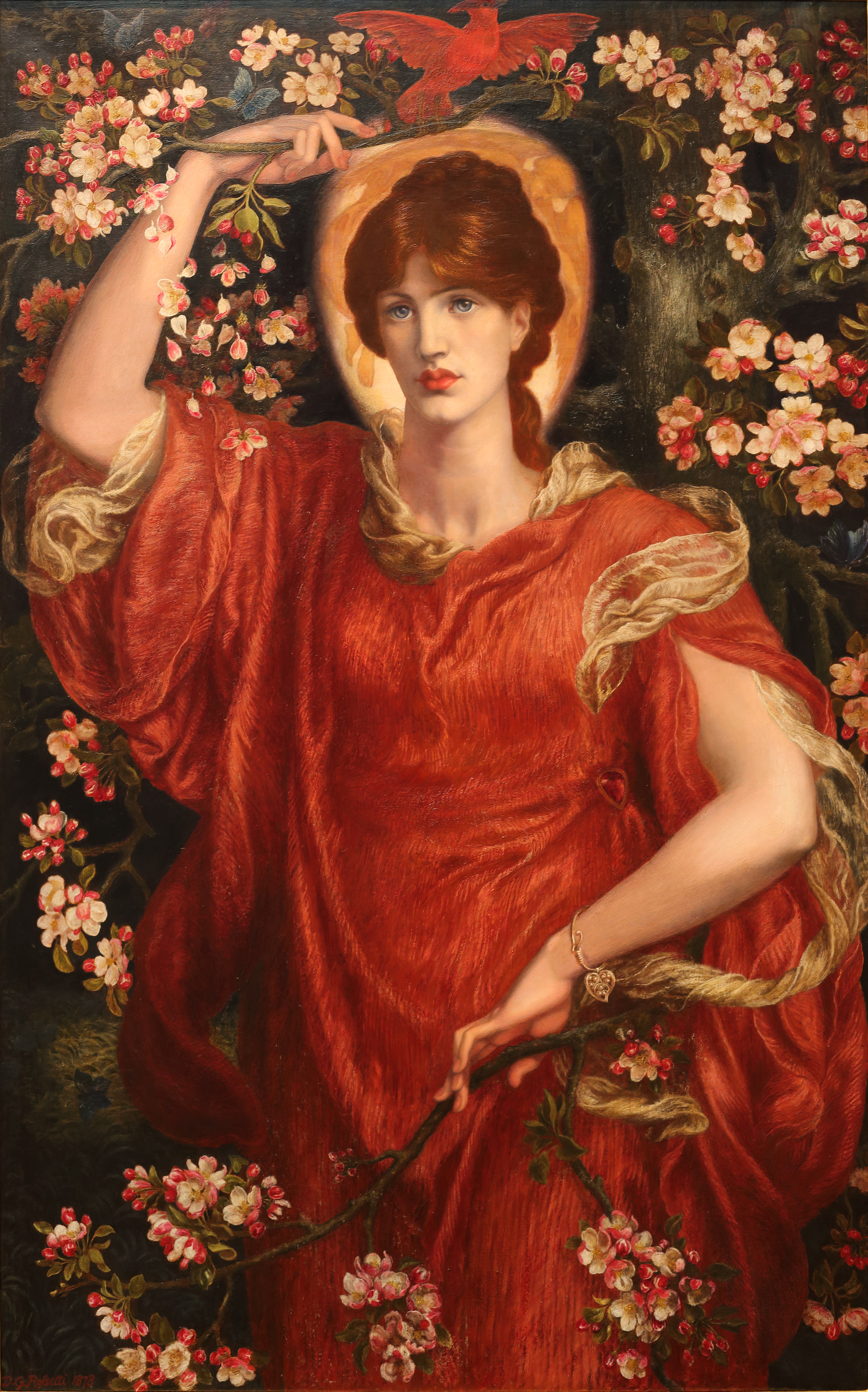
A Vision of Fiammetta by Dante Gabriel Rossetti, 1878

Maria d'Aquino (died in 1382) was a Neapolitan noblewoman who is traditionally identified with Giovanni Boccaccio's beloved and muse Fiammetta (Italian for "little flame").

Maria d'Aquino was a “royal bastard”, an illegitimate daughter of Robert the Wise, King of Naples and Count of Provence. She was an accomplice in the 1345 murder of King Andrew, the husband of her niece and Robert's successor, Queen Joanna I. For this Maria was sentenced to death and beheaded in 1382 on the orders of Queen Joanna I's successor, King Charles III.

Boccaccio wrote about Maria d'Aquino and their relationship in several of his literary works. She is traditionally identified as Fiammetta. According to him, Maria's mother was a Provençal noblewoman, Sibila Sabran, wife of Count Thomas IV of Aquino. She was born after Countess Sibila and King Robert committed adultery at his coronation festivities in 1310, but was given the family name of her mother's husband. Her putative father placed her in a convent.

== Historicity ==
Boccaccio scholar G. H. McWilliam contends that Maria d'Aquino did not even exist as little evidence outside of Giovanni Boccaccio's own work is given for her existence. According to McWilliam, the medieval art of courtly love which Boccaccio followed was put down by Andreas Capellanus and it heavily revolved around unreciprocated love of a noblewoman outside the lover's class. Boccaccio may have created this woman to follow medieval standards of love more closely. McWilliam briefly discusses this hypothesis in the footnotes of the Penguin Classics edition of The Decameron.

== Literature ==
Fiammetta appears in the following works by Boccaccio:

- The Filocolo
- Teseida
- Il Filostrato
- Ninfale d'Ameto
- Amorosa visione
- Fiammetta (novel)
- Ninfale fiesolano
- The Decameron (Novels № I, 5; II, 5; III, 6; IV, 1; V, 9; VI, 6; VII, 5; VIII, 6; IX, 5; X, 6)
- Sonnets (№ XLV, XCVII, CII, CXXVI)

== See also ==
- Fiametta

== Bibliography ==
- Van Kerrebrouck, Patrick (2000). Les Capétiens: 987-1328. Vol. 2. Franz Steiner Verlag. ISBN 9782950150943.
- Boccaccio, Giovanni (1998). Nathaniel Edward Griffin; Arthur Beckwith Myrick (eds.). The Filostrato of Giovanni Boccaccio. Vol. 2. Biblo & Tannen Publishers. ISBN 081960187X.
