= Anne Clough =

English suffragist (1820–1892)

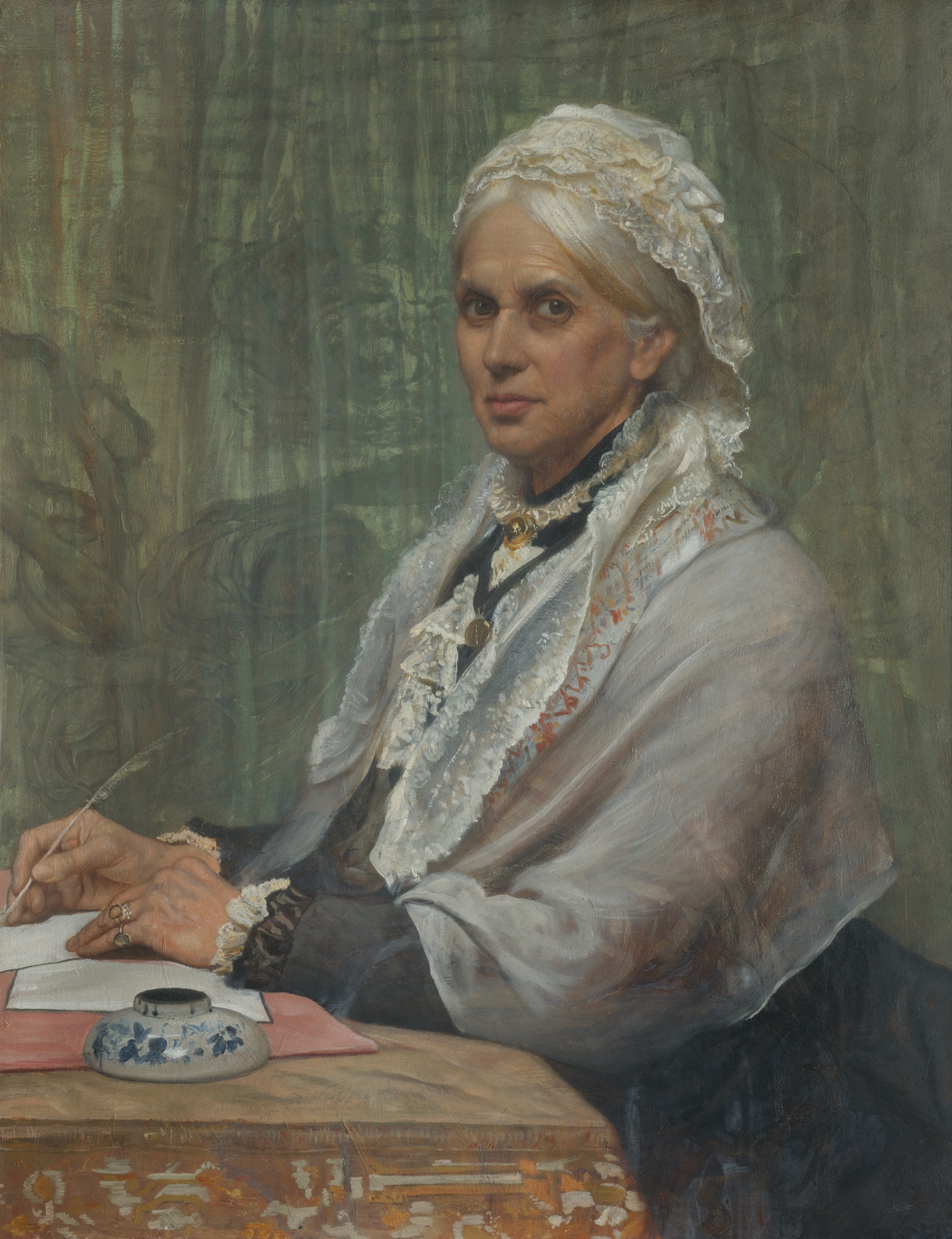
- Born: Anne Jemima Clough; 20 January 1820; Liverpool, Lancashire, England
- Died: 27 February 1892 (aged 72); Cambridge, Cambridgeshire, England

Academic background
- Influences: Emily Davies, Barbara Bodichon, Frances Buss

Academic work
- Institutions: First Principal Newnham College, Cambridge
- Main interests: Suffragist

Anne Jemima Clough (20 January 1820 – 27 February 1892) was an early English suffragist and a promoter of higher education for women. She was the first principal of Newnham College, Cambridge.

== Life ==
Clough was born at Liverpool, Lancashire, the daughter of cotton merchant James Butler Clough and Anne (née Perfect). James Butler Clough was a younger son of a landed gentry family that had been living at Plas Clough in Denbighshire since 1567.

Anne's brother was Arthur Hugh Clough, the poet and assistant to Florence Nightingale. When two years old she was taken with the rest of the family to Charleston, South Carolina. It was not till 1836 that she returned to Britain.

Anne's own education was entirely at home, as was common for middle and upper-class women of the time. She worked as a volunteer in a Liverpool charity school and became determined to run a school of her own.

When her father became bankrupt in 1841, she took the opportunity to set up a small day school. This enabled her to contribute financially, while fulfilling her interest in education. She subsequently worked at the Borough Road School and the Home and Colonial School Society. After her father's death, she moved to Ambleside, setting up a school for local children and boarders, Eller How.

On the death of her brother Arthur, she moved to Surrey, to support her sister-in-law Blanche Clough in bringing up their three small children. The youngest daughter, Blanche Athena Clough, would follow in her aunt's footsteps and herself become a notable educationalist.

Keenly interested in the education of women, she made friends with Emily Davies, Barbara Bodichon, Frances Buss and others. She gave evidence to a Royal Commission on secondary schooling, based on her own teaching experience. After helping to found the North of England Council for Promoting the Higher Education of Women, she acted as its secretary from 1867 to 1870 and as its president from 1873 to 1874. Her scheme for peripatetic lecturers was the germ of the University Extension Movement.

== The foundation of Newnham College ==
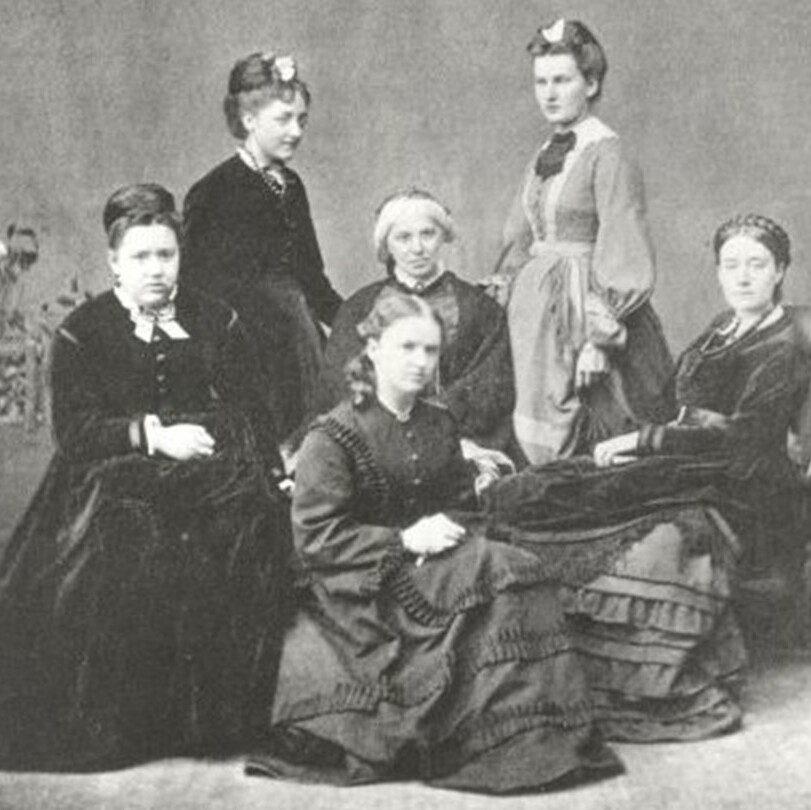
The first five students at Newnham Hall in 1871 with the Principal, Anne Clough (right)

When the 'Lectures for Ladies' were set up in Cambridge in the 1870s, it became clear that women who lived at a distance would need accommodation. Henry Sidgwick invited Clough to take charge of the first hostel and its first five students, setting up in Regent Street, Cambridge, in 1871.

The lectures and hostel swiftly became Newnham College, and Clough its first principal. The new college took a different approach to women's education from Girton College: where Girton focused on equality, Newnham focused on intellectual flourishing. Girton insisted women take all the same exams as men, where Newnham allowed women to skip the "Little-Go" exam of Latin, Greek and divinity and progress directly to studying their chosen subject. Similarly, while Girton's residence was a more surprising design, created by architect Alfred Waterhouse, Newnham Hall was designed to be more tranquil and domestic.

A later biographer described Clough as having "inexhaustible good humour, plenty of common sense and fun, and an enviable ability to admit when she was wrong. These qualities made her students cherish her and enabled her to work well and creatively with her colleagues." Though she had little experience of administration, she oversaw the building of the new college and negotiations over leasing the land.

Her personality, commitment and drive made her "a recognised leader in the education of women".

== Death and legacy ==
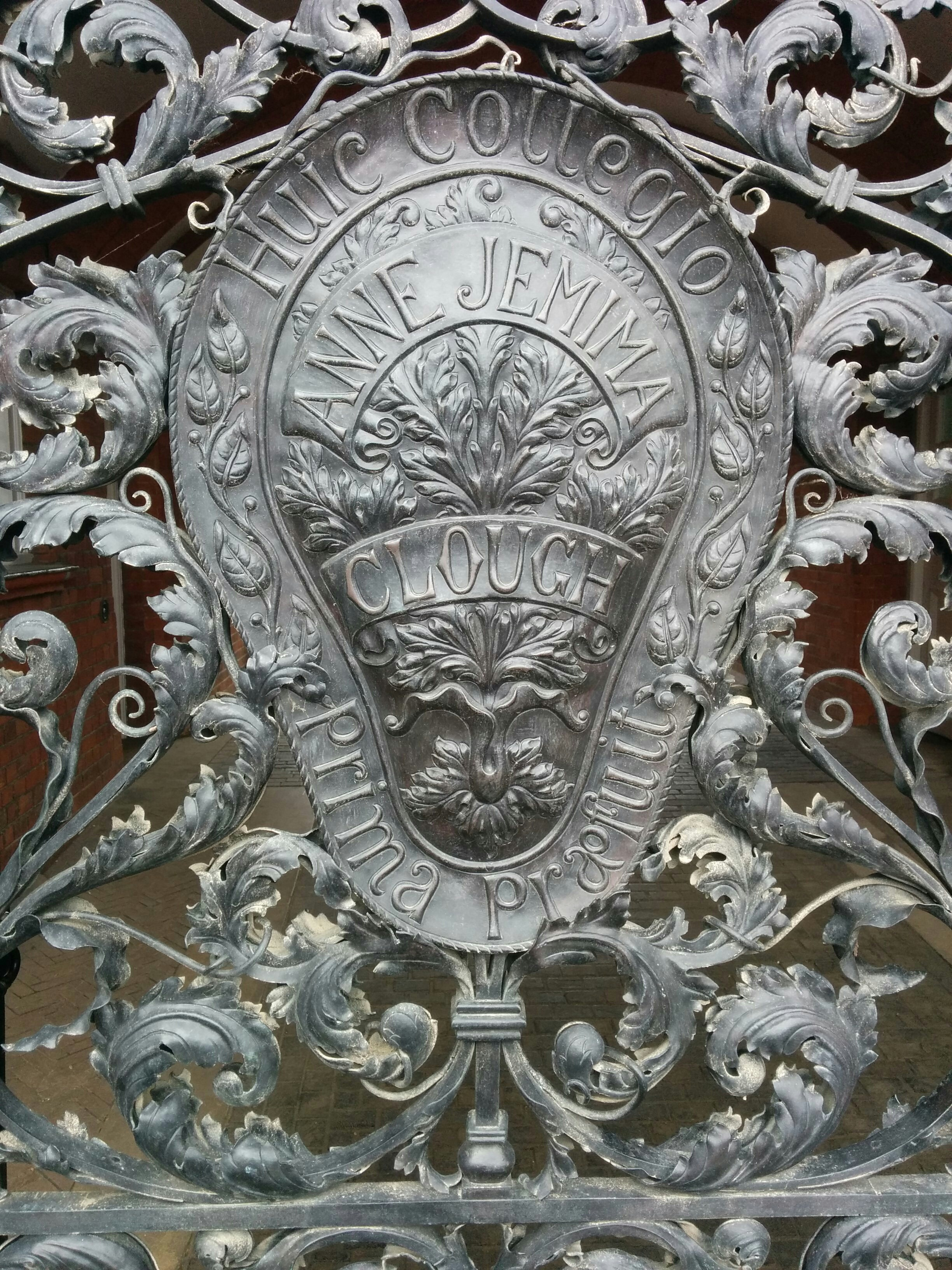
Detail on Memorial gates at the college

She was cared for at the end of her life by her niece Blanche Athena Clough and her friend Edith Sharpley who was the classics lecturer. They were both present when she died, at Cambridge on 27 February 1892. Two portraits of Clough are at Newnham College, one by Sir William Blake Richmond, the other by James Jebusa Shannon.

Her grave is in the churchyard of the Church of St Andrew and St Mary, Grantchester, near Cambridge.

Her legacy is marked in Clough Hall and the Clough memorial gates at Newnham College, a stained glass window at Liverpool Cathedral, the Hope Street sculpture "A Case History" in Liverpool. Her birthplace in Liverpool is marked with a plaque, commemorating both Anne Jemima and her brother Arthur Hugh.

Edge Hill University has a hall of residence called Clough in honour of her contribution to higher education and the history of education in Lancashire.

== Sources ==
- Gloyn, Liz (17 November 2016), "This is not a chapter about Jane Harrison: Teaching classics at Newnham College, 1882–1922", in Wyles, Rosie; Hall, Edith (eds.), Women Classical Scholars: Unsealing the Fountain from the Renaissance to Jacqueline de Romilly, OUP Oxford, pp. 174–175, ISBN 978-0-19-103829-7
- Sutherland, Gillian. "Clough, Anne Jemima (1820–1892)". Oxford Dictionary of National Biography (online ed.). Oxford University Press. doi:10.1093/ref:odnb/5710. (Subscription, Wikipedia Library access or UK public library membership required.)
- This article incorporates text from a publication now in the public domain: Lee, Elizabeth (1901). "Clough, Anne Jemima". In Lee, Sidney (ed.). Dictionary of National Biography (1st supplement). London: Smith, Elder & Co. pp. 35–36.
- This cites Memoir of Anne Jemima Clough, by Blanche Athena Clough (1897).

Academic offices
Preceded by First Principal	Principal of Newnham College, Cambridge; 1871–1892	Succeeded by Eleanor Mildred Sidgwick
