= Arthur Hugh Clough =

English poet (1819–1861)

Arthur H. Clough
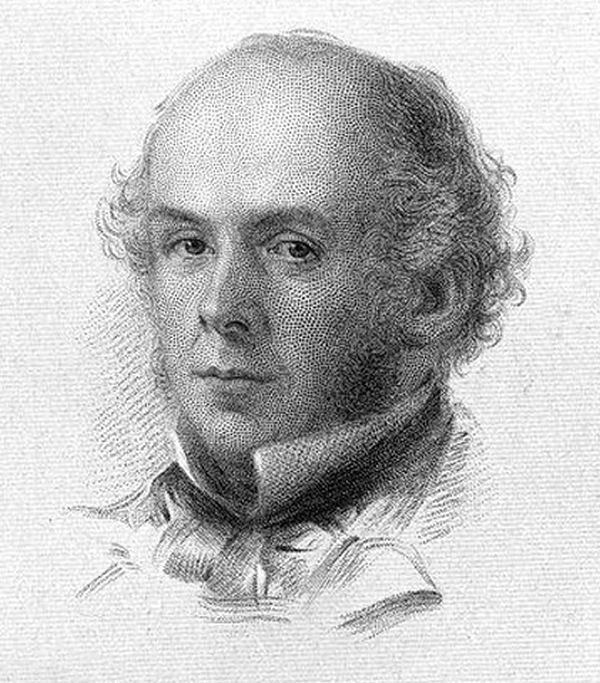
- Born: 1 January 1819; Liverpool, England, UK
- Died: 13 November 1861 (aged 42); Florence, Kingdom of Italy
- Education: Balliol College, Oxford
- Spouse: Blanche Mary Shore Smith
- Writing career
- Language: English
- Genre: Poetry

Arthur Hugh Clough (/klʌf/ KLUF; 1 January 1819 – 13 November 1861) was an English poet, an educationalist, and the devoted assistant to Florence Nightingale. He was the brother of suffragist Anne Clough and father of Blanche Athena Clough, who both became principals of Newnham College, Cambridge. Clough's notable poetic works include The Bothie of Toper-na-fuosich (1848), a long narrative poem, and "Say Not the Struggle Naught Availeth" (1855), a short poem of 16 lines.

== Life ==
Arthur Clough was born in Liverpool to James Butler Clough, a cotton merchant of Welsh descent, and Anne Perfect, from Pontefract in Yorkshire. James Butler Clough was a younger son of a landed gentry family that had been living at Plas Clough in Denbighshire since 1567. In 1822 the family moved to the United States, and Clough's early childhood was spent mainly in Charleston, South Carolina. In 1828 Clough and his elder brother Charles Butler Clough (later head of the Clough family of Llwyn Offa, Flintshire and Boughton House, Chester, a magistrate and Deputy Lieutenant) returned to England to attend school in Chester. Holidays were often spent at Beaumaris. In 1829 Clough began attending Rugby School, then under Thomas Arnold, whose belief in rigorous education and lifestyles he accepted, such as Muscular Christianity. Cut off to a large degree from his family, he passed a somewhat solitary boyhood, devoted to the school and to early literary efforts in the Rugby Magazine. In 1836 his parents returned to Liverpool, and in 1837 he won a scholarship to Balliol College, Oxford. Here his contemporaries included Benjamin Jowett, Arthur Penrhyn Stanley, John Campbell Shairp, William George Ward and Frederick Temple. Matthew Arnold, four years his junior, arrived the term after Clough had graduated. Clough and Arnold enjoyed an intense friendship in Oxford.

Oxford in 1837 was in the full swirl of the High Church movement led by John Henry Newman. Clough was for a time influenced by this movement, but eventually rejected it. He surprised everyone by graduating from Oxford with only Second Class Honours, but won a fellowship with a tutorship at Oriel College. He became unwilling to teach the doctrines of the Church of England, as his tutorship required of him, and in 1848 he resigned the position and travelled to Paris, where he witnessed the revolution of 1848. Ralph Waldo Emerson was also in Paris at that time, and Clough saw him daily in May and June, and months later after his return to England. As Edward Everett Hale tells the story:

Clough accompanied [Emerson] to Liverpool to see him off on his return to the United States, saying sadly, "What shall we do without you? Think where we are. Carlyle has led us all out into the desert and he has left us there" – a remark which was exactly true. Emerson said in reply that very many of the fine young men in England had said this to him as he went up and down in his journeyings there. "And I put my hand upon his head as we walked, and I said, 'Clough, I consecrate you Bishop of All England. It shall be your part to go up and down through the desert to find out these wanderers and to lead them into the promised land'."

In the summer of 1848, Clough wrote his long poem The Bothie of Toper-na-fuosich, a farewell to the academic life, following it up with poems from his time as student and tutor, in the shared publication Ambarvalia. In 1849, he witnessed another revolution, the siege of the Roman Republic, which inspired another long poem, Amours de Voyage (reprinted by Persephone Books in 2009). Easter Day, written in Naples, was a passionate denial of the Resurrection and the forerunner of the unfinished poem Dipsychus.

Since 1846, Clough had been financially responsible for his mother and sister (following the death of his father and younger brother and the marriage of his elder brother). In the autumn of 1849, to provide for them, he became principal of University Hall, a hostel for Unitarian students at University College, London, but found its ideology as oppressive as that which he had left behind in Oxford. He soon found that he disliked London, in spite of the friendship of Thomas Carlyle and his wife Jane Welsh Carlyle.

A prospect of a post in Sydney led him to engage himself to Blanche Mary Shore Smith, daughter of Samuel Smith, of Combe Hurst, Surrey and Mary Shore (sister to William Nightingale) but when that failed to materialize, he travelled in 1852 to Cambridge, Massachusetts, encouraged by Ralph Waldo Emerson. There he remained for several months, lecturing and editing Plutarch for the booksellers, until in 1853 the offer of an examinership in the Education Office brought him to London once more. He married Miss Shore Smith and pursued a steady official career, diversified only by an appointment in 1856 as secretary to a commission sent to study foreign military education. He devoted enormous energy to working as an unpaid secretarial assistant to his wife's cousin Florence Nightingale. He wrote virtually no poetry for six years.

In 1860, his health began to fail. He visited first Great Malvern and Freshwater, Isle of Wight. From April 1861, he travelled strenuously in Greece, Turkey and France, where he met up with the Tennyson family. Despite his fragile health, this Continental tour renewed a state of euphoria like that of 1848–49, and he quickly wrote the elements of his last long poem, Mari Magno. His wife joined him on a voyage from Switzerland to Italy, where he contracted malaria.

He died in Florence on 13 November 1861. He is buried in the English Cemetery there, in a tomb that his wife and sister had Susan Horner design from Jean-François Champollion's book on Egyptian hieroglyphs. Matthew Arnold wrote the elegy of Thyrsis to his memory.

Clough and his wife had three children: Arthur, Florence, and Blanche Athena. The youngest child, Blanche Athena Clough (1861–1960), devoted her life to Newnham College, Cambridge, where her aunt (his sister Anne) was principal.

== Writings ==
Shortly before he left Oxford, during the Great Famine of Ireland of 1845–1849, Clough wrote an ethical pamphlet addressed to the undergraduates, with the title, A Consideration of Objections against the Retrenchment Association at Oxford (1847). His Homeric pastoral The Bothie of Toper-na-fuosich, afterwards renamed Tober-na-Vuolich (1848), and written in hexameter is full of socialism, reading-party humours and Scottish scenery. Ambarvalia (1849), published jointly with his friend Thomas Burbidge, contains shorter poems of various dates from circa 1840 onwards.

Amours de Voyage, a novel in verse, was written at Rome in 1849; Dipsychus, a rather amorphous satire, at Venice in 1850; and the idylls which make up Mari Magno, or Tales on Board, in 1861. A few lyric and elegiac pieces, later in date than the Ambarvalia, complete Clough's poetic output. His only considerable enterprise in prose was a revision of a 17th-century translation of Plutarch (called the "Dryden Translation," but actually the product of translators other than Dryden) which occupied him from 1852, and was published as Plutarch's Lives (1859).

Clough's output is small and much of it appeared posthumously. Anthony Kenny notes that the editions prepared by Clough's widow, Blanche, have "been criticized ... for omitting, in the interests of propriety, significant passages in Dipsychus and other poems." But editing Clough's literary remains has proven a challenging task even for later editors. Kenny goes on to state that "it was no mean feat to have placed almost all of Clough's poetry in the public domain within a decade, and to have secured for it general critical and popular acclaim."

His long poems have a certain narrative and psychological penetration, and some of his lyrics have a strength of melody to match their depth of thought. He has been regarded as one of the most forward-looking English poets of the 19th century, in part due to a sexual frankness that shocked his contemporaries. He often went against the popular religious and social ideals of his day, and his verse is said to have the melancholy and the perplexity of an age of transition, although Through a Glass Darkly suggests that he did not lack certain Christian beliefs of his own, and in particular a belief in the afterlife where the struggle for virtue will be rewarded. His work is interesting to students of meter, owing to the experiments which he made, in the Bothie and elsewhere, with English hexameters and other types of verse formed upon classical models.

Clough wrote the short poem "Say Not the Struggle Naught Availeth", a rousing call invoking military metaphors to keep up the good fight; which fight is unspecified, but it was written in the wake of the defeat of Chartism in 1848. Other short poems include "Through a Glass Darkly", an exploration of Christian faith and doubt, and "The Latest Decalogue", a satirical take on the Ten Commandments.

"The Latest Decalogue's" couplet on murder, "Thou shalt not kill; but needst not strive officiously to keep alive:" is often quoted – usually out of context – in debates on medical ethics in the sense that it is not right to struggle to keep terminally ill people alive, especially if they are suffering. Further, this couplet influenced Isaac Asimov's Three Laws of Robotics (in particular, the First Law's "or through inaction" clause). Broadcaster Geoffrey Robertson QC used the phrase in an episode of his television series, Geoffrey Robertson's Hypotheticals ("Affairs of the Heart," ABC, 1989), illustrating this point of view; it is unclear whether Robertson was aware Clough's version of the Fifth Commandment had nothing to do with the alleviation of suffering but was instead referring to those who do not afford—in any circumstances—due respect to the sanctity of human life. Clough himself gives no indication that the couplet on murder might refer to the medical profession in general or to the treatment of the terminally ill in particular; indeed, the entire text of "The Latest Decalogue" satirizes the hypocrisy, materialism, the selective ethics and self-interest common to all of mankind.

This bitter judgement of humanity should be balanced against the more compassionate view he displays in other poems such as "Through A Glass Darkly": "Ah yet when all is thought and said, the heart still overrules the head; still what we hope we must believe, and what is given us receive".

In the novel The French Lieutenant's Woman by John Fowles, several chapters have epigraphs from poems by Clough: "Duty" (1841), The Bothie of Toper-na-fuosich (1848) and "Poems" (1841–1852).

== Collections ==
University College London Special Collections holds letters from Clough to E W Field which discuss religious issues and accomodation.

== Notes ==
Attribution:
