= Blanche Athena Clough =

- by A. J. Pertz (detail of painting at Newnham)
- Born: 1861
- Died: 1960 (aged 98–99)
- Education: Newnham College, Cambridge
- Known for: Principal of Newnham College, Cambridge
- Parent(s): Arthur Hugh Clough and Blanche Mary Shore Smith
- Relatives: Anne Clough (aunt)

Blanche Athena Clough (1861–1960) was a British classicist and educational administrator who was the Principal of Newnham College, Cambridge (1920–1923).

== Biography ==
Clough came up to Newnham College, Cambridge in 1884 to read Classics, some 13 years after its foundation. Her aunt, Anne Clough, was Principal of the College, at a time when women's higher education remained controversial: women could not be members of the University of Cambridge or receive Cambridge degrees. After completing her studies, Clough took on the role of secretary to the Principal, and administrator to the rapidly-growing college. In 1896 she became one of three vice-principals, who performed a tutorial as much as an administrative role.

Clough was among those responsible for shaping the College's response to a rapidly changing society, and new expectations for and of women, including the growing suffragette movement and the First World War. She was particularly involved in assisting then Principal Katharine Stephen in work towards the Royal Charter and Statutes granted in 1917 whereby Newnham College became the first women's College to be a self-governing academic community. At the same time, she contributed to the organization of women's war work. In 1917, under the reorganization of college government following the granting of the Royal Charter, she became sole vice-principal.

In 1918, Clough was the sole female member of the Cambridge section of the Royal Commission considering the finances of Oxford and Cambridge.

Clough was elected Principal in 1920, a time of major change for the country and the College. She had previously refused the role, in 1911. During her time as Principal (1920–1923), Clough fought to have women admitted to full membership of Cambridge University. The principle that women's admittance to the University be linked to government funding was refused in 1921. It was she who was Principal during the 1921 attacks on Newnham during undergraduate riots against women students. During these difficult times, Clough led the Fellowship, maintained unity with Girton College, and built relationships with male supporters of women's education.

After Clough's retirement in 1923, she devoted her time to gardening, bird-watching, and volunteering for the London and National Society for Women's Service which became the Fawcett Society in 1953. A. J. Pertz painted Clough while Principal of Newnham College and the portrait hangs in the college today. Ray Strachey painted two portraits of Clough between 1925–1931 which are now in the National Portrait Gallery.

== Family ==
Clough was the youngest child of Arthur Hugh Clough and Blanche Mary Shore Smith. Her aunt was Anne Clough.

== Publications ==
Memoir of Anne Jemima Clough (Arnold, London, 1903)

Academic offices
| Preceded by Katharine Stephen | Principal of Newnham College, Cambridge; 1920–1923 | Succeeded by Pernel Strachey |
