= A Vision of Fiammetta =

1878 painting by Dante Gabriel Rossetti

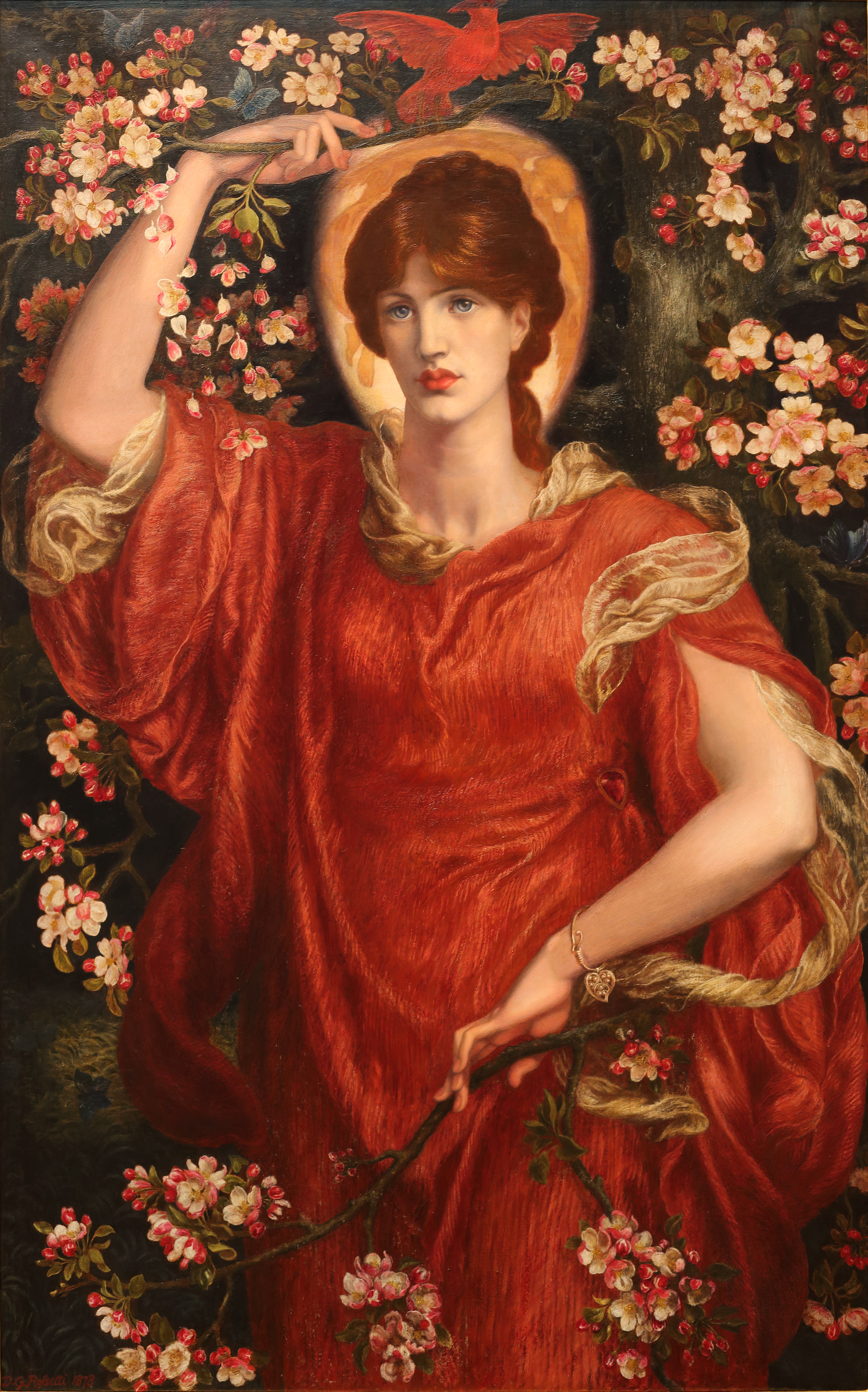
- Artist: Dante Gabriel Rossetti
- Year: 1878
- Medium: Oil on canvas
- Dimensions: 140 cm × 91 cm (55 in × 36 in)
- Location: Private collection of Andrew Lloyd Webber

A Vision of Fiammetta is an oil painting created by Dante Gabriel Rossetti, in the Pre-Raphaelite style, created in 1878. The painting was one half of one of Rossetti's "double works", accompanying his Ballads and Sonnets (1881). Maria Spartali Stillman modelled for the painting. The subject of painting is Boccaccio's muse named Fiammetta.

== Subject ==
The frame of the painting is inscribed with three texts: the sonnet by Boccaccio entitled "On his Last Sight of Fiammetta," which inspired the painting; Rossetti's translation of it, and his own poem mirroring the painting:

Behold Fiammetta, shown in Vision here.

Gloom-girt 'mid Spring-flushed apple-growth she stands;
And as she sways the branches with her hands,
Along her arm the sundered bloom falls sheer,
In separate petals shed, each like a tear;
While from the quivering bough the bird expands
His wings. And lo! thy spirit understands
Life shaken and shower'd and flown, and Death drawn near.

All stirs with change. Her garments beat the air:
The angel circling round her aureole
Shimmers in flight against the tree's grey bole:
While she, with reassuring eyes most fair,
A presage and a promise stands; as 'twere

On Death's dark storm the rainbow of the Soul.

== Provenance ==
The painting was originally in the possession of William Alfred Turner (1839–1886), a businessman, director for a time of the Edison Electric Lighting Company, who owned Joli cœur (1867 Manchester City Art Gallery), Water Willow, a chalk study for La Bella Mano, another one for Mnemosyne (1876, and the oil version of Proserpine (1877 collection privée). Through a sequence of other owners A Vision of Fiammetta has now found its way into the collection of Lord Andrew Lloyd Webber.

== See also ==
- List of paintings by Dante Gabriel Rossetti
