= William James Stillman =

American painter (1828-1901)

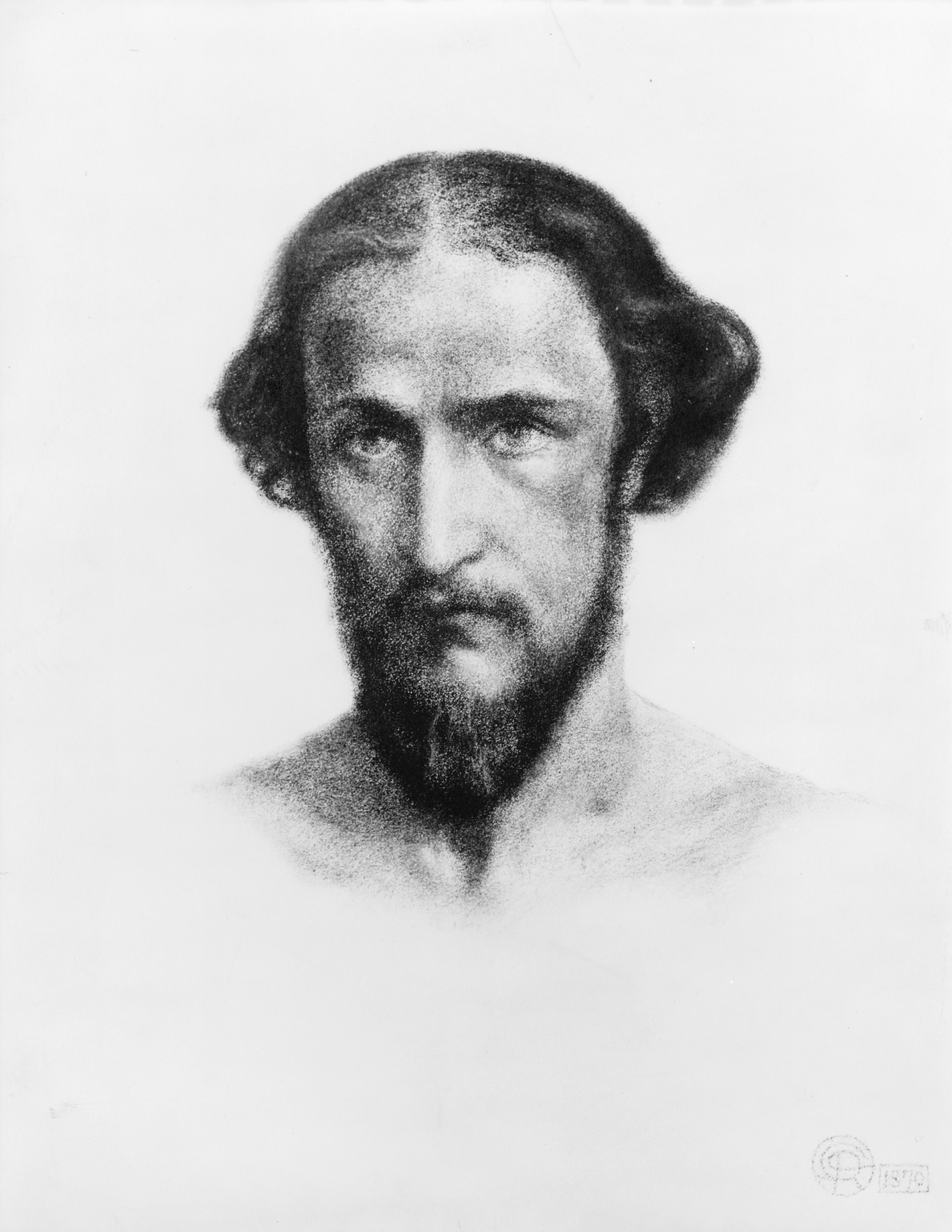
- Born: June 1, 1828; Schenectady, New York
- Died: July 6, 1901 (aged 73); Surrey, England
- Citizenship: United States
- Spouse(s): Laura Mack; Marie Spartali Stillman

William James Stillman (June 1, 1828 – July 6, 1901) was an American journalist, diplomat, author, historian, and photographer. Educated as an artist, Stillman subsequently converted to the profession of journalism, working primarily as a war correspondent in Crete and the Balkans, where he served as his own photographer. For a time, he also served as United States consul in Rome, and afterward in Crete during the Cretan insurrections. He helped to train the young Arthur Evans as a war correspondent in the Balkans, and remained a lifelong friend and confidant of Evans. Later in life, he seriously considered taking over the excavation at Knossos from Minos Kalokairinos, who had been stopped from further excavation by the Cretan Assembly; he was, however, prevented from pursuing that goal further by a failure to obtain a firman, or permission, to excavate. Stillman wrote several books, one of which, his Autobiography of a Journalist, suggests that he viewed himself primarily as a writer.

== Biography ==
Stillman was born in Schenectady, New York, in 1828. His parents were Seventh Day Baptists, and his early religious training influenced him throughout his life. He was sent to school in New York by his mother, who made great sacrifices so that he might get an education, and he graduated from Union College of Schenectady in 1848. Deciding at that time to pursue a career in art, he was one of the first students of the eminent Hudson River School painter Frederic Edwin Church, then fresh from his own studies with Thomas Cole and setting out on a career that would see him become the most famous (and financially successful) artist in America. Stillman had a contentious relationship with Church but picked up skills in the art of oil on canvas that would serve him well in the small but accomplished group of paintings by his hand that have survived, including, most famously, The Philosophers' Camp (Concord, MA Public Library). In 1850, Stillman traveled to England, where he made the acquaintance of John Ruskin, whose Modern Painters he had devoured; was introduced to J. M. W. Turner, for whose works he had unbounded admiration; and fell so profoundly under the influence of Dante Gabriel Rossetti and John Everett Millais that on his return home in the same year he became known as the "American Pre-Raphaelite." While Stillman had modest success as a painter and photographer, with far more productivity and innovation in the latter medium, his most lasting contribution to the arts in America was the founding of the periodical The Crayon directly under the influence of Ruskin. This publication had wide influence in his lifetime and since.

In 1852 Lajos Kossuth sent him on a fool's errand to Hungary to dig up crown jewels, which had been buried secretly during the insurrection of 1848–1849. While he was awaiting a projected rising in Milan, Stillman studied art under Yvon in Paris, and then, as the rising did not take place, he returned to the United States and devoted himself to landscape painting on Upper Saranac Lake in the Adirondacks and in New York City, where he started the Crayon. It numbered Lowell, Aldrich and Charles Eliot Norton among its contributors, and when it failed for want of funds, Stillman removed to Cambridge, Massachusetts.

There he passed several years, but a fit of restlessness started him off once more to England. He renewed his friendship with Ruskin, and went with him to Switzerland to paint and draw in the Alps, where he worked so assiduously that his eyesight was affected. He then lived in Paris and was in Normandy in 1861 when the American Civil War broke out. He made more than one attempt to serve in the Northern ranks, but his health was too weak; in the same year he was appointed United States consul in Rome.

In 1865 a dispute with his government led to his resignation, but immediately afterwards he was appointed to Crete, where, as an avowed champion of the Christians in the island and of Cretan independence, he was regarded with hostility both by the Muslim population and by the Turkish authorities during the subsequent Cretan uprising. In September 1868 he resigned and went to Athens, where his first wife (a daughter of David Mack of Cambridge), worn out by the excitement of life in Crete, committed suicide.

He was an editor of Scribner's Magazine for a short time and then went to London, where he lived with Dante Gabriel Rossetti. In 1871 he married artist Marie Spartali, a second generation Pre-Raphaelite painter, and a daughter of the Greek consul-general Michael Spartali, although without his permission. When the insurrection of 1875 broke out in Herzegovina he went there as a correspondent of The Times, and his letters from the Balkans aroused so much interest that the British government was induced to lend its countenance to Montenegrin aspirations.

In 1877–1883 he served as the correspondent of The Times at Athens; in 1886–1898 at Rome. During this time he was assisted in his photographic work by the nascent archaeologist and photographer, John Henry Haynes. He was a severe critic of Italian statesmen, and embroiled himself at various times with various politicians, from Crispi downwards.

After his retirement he lived in Surrey, England, where he died on July 6, 1901, at Frimley Green.

== Publications ==
He wrote The Cretan Insurrection of 1866–1868 (1874), "The Amateur's Photographic Guide Book" (1874) On the Track of Ulysses (1888), Billy and Hans (1897), "The Old Rome and the New" (1898), The Union of Italy, 1815–1895 (1898), and Francesco Crispi (1899).

== Criticism and legacy ==
Recent critics such as Andrew Szegedy-Maszak (in Antiquity and Photography, Getty Museum, 2005) have argued that Stillman's photography, especially an album of views of the Athenian Acropolis, displayed an artistic sensibility and a genius of a higher order than the rest of his work. The first series was photographed in 1869 and privately published in 1870; Stillman rephotographed the Acropolis in 1882 and subsequently reordered the combined series in a second album. Stillman's photographs, in their daring perspectives, in their creative synthesis (inspired by Ruskinian ideas) of aesthetic feeling and a scientific/scholarly perspective on architectural form, and in their incorporation of the Greek landscape and the modern Greek context of ancient ruins, show a startlingly modern sensibility for their time, a way of seeing utterly different from the commercial photography of contemporary Greeks and foreigners, whose representations tended to cater to the set expectations of the foreign philhellenic and touristic market.
