= Ionides (surname) =

Ionides is a Greek surname. Notable people with the surname include:

- Alexander Constantine Ionides (born 1810), British art patron
- Basil Ionides (born 1884), British architect
- Constantine Alexander Ionides (born 1833), British art patron
- Constantine John Philip Ionides (born 1901), British naturalist

== See also ==
- The Ionides Family, an 1840 painting by George Frederic Watts
