= The Mill (Burne-Jones) =

Painting by Edward Burne-Jones

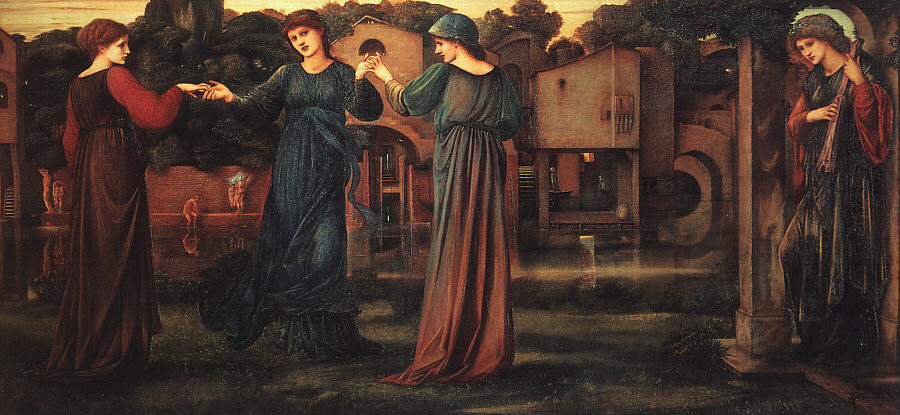
- Artist: Sir Edward Burne-Jones
- Completion date: 1882
- Medium: Oil on canvas
- Dimensions: 91 cm × 197 cm (36 in × 78 in)
- Location: Victoria and Albert Museum; London

The Mill is an Aesthetic Movement, Renaissance-inspired oil on canvas painting completed by the English painter Edward Burne-Jones in 1882. It depicts three dancing women and a musician in front of a mill pond on a summer evening, with several nude men and a wooded landscape in the background. The painting is 91 centimetres (36 in) in height, and 197 centimetres (78 in) in width.

Edward Burne-Jones took twelve years to complete The Mill, starting work in 1870 and completing it in 1882. Shortly after its completion, the painting was displayed at an exhibition at the Grosvenor Gallery. The Mill was inspired by The Allegory of Good and Bad Government, a mural painted by Italian Renaissance artist Ambrogio Lorenzetti between 1338 and 1340. The dancing women in the painting were modelled upon women known to Burne-Jones personally: from left to right, Aglaia Coronio, Marie Stillman, and Maria Zambaco. Aglaia was the daughter of Constantine Ionides, who, like Burne-Jones, was interested in art. Marie was a painter, and Maria was Ionides' granddaughter. At the time, Maria was Burne-Jones' mistress.

The Mill is a vague and mysterious painting with no particular meaning. It incorporates styles from the Aesthetic Movement and the Renaissance. In the painting, three women wearing simple, Renaissance-style aesthetic dresses are dancing in a garden on a summer evening. On the right of the dancing women, a musician of an indiscernible gender is standing under a loggia. A mill pond can be seen behind the women. On the other side of the pond, there are several nude men, who are presumably swimming. In the background is an unspecific landscape consisting of various designs and types of architecture.

== Ownership ==
Constantine Ionides bought the painting on 21 April 1882 for £905. It is now in the Victoria and Albert Museum, in London.

== See also ==
- List of paintings by Edward Burne-Jones
