= The Departure of the Shunammite Woman =

Painting by Ferdinand Bol

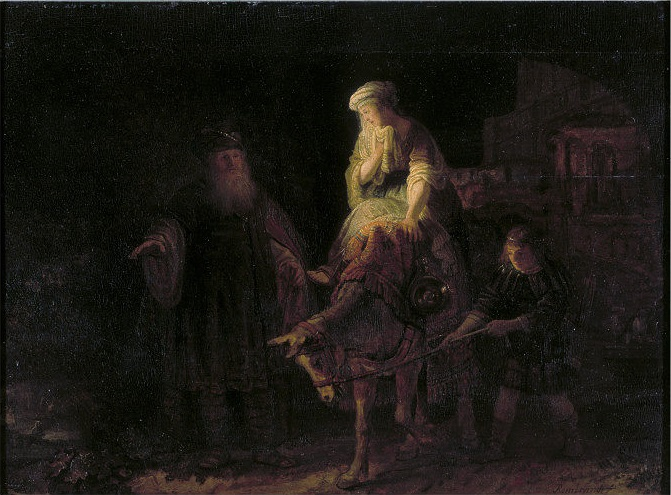
- Year: 1640
- Medium: paint, oak panel
- Dimensions: 39 cm (15 in) × 53.2 cm (20.9 in)
- Owner: Constantine Alexander Ionides
- Identifiers: RKDimages ID: 50806

The Departure of the Shunammite Woman or Abraham Dismissing Hagar and Ishmael is a 1640 painting by the studio of Rembrandt, probably by Ferdinand Bol. It is now in the Victoria and Albert Museum in London. It shows either Hagar and Ishmael or the Shunammite woman from 2 Kings 4.
