= Windycroft =

Listed house in East Sussex

Coordinates: 50°51′38″N 00°35′56″E

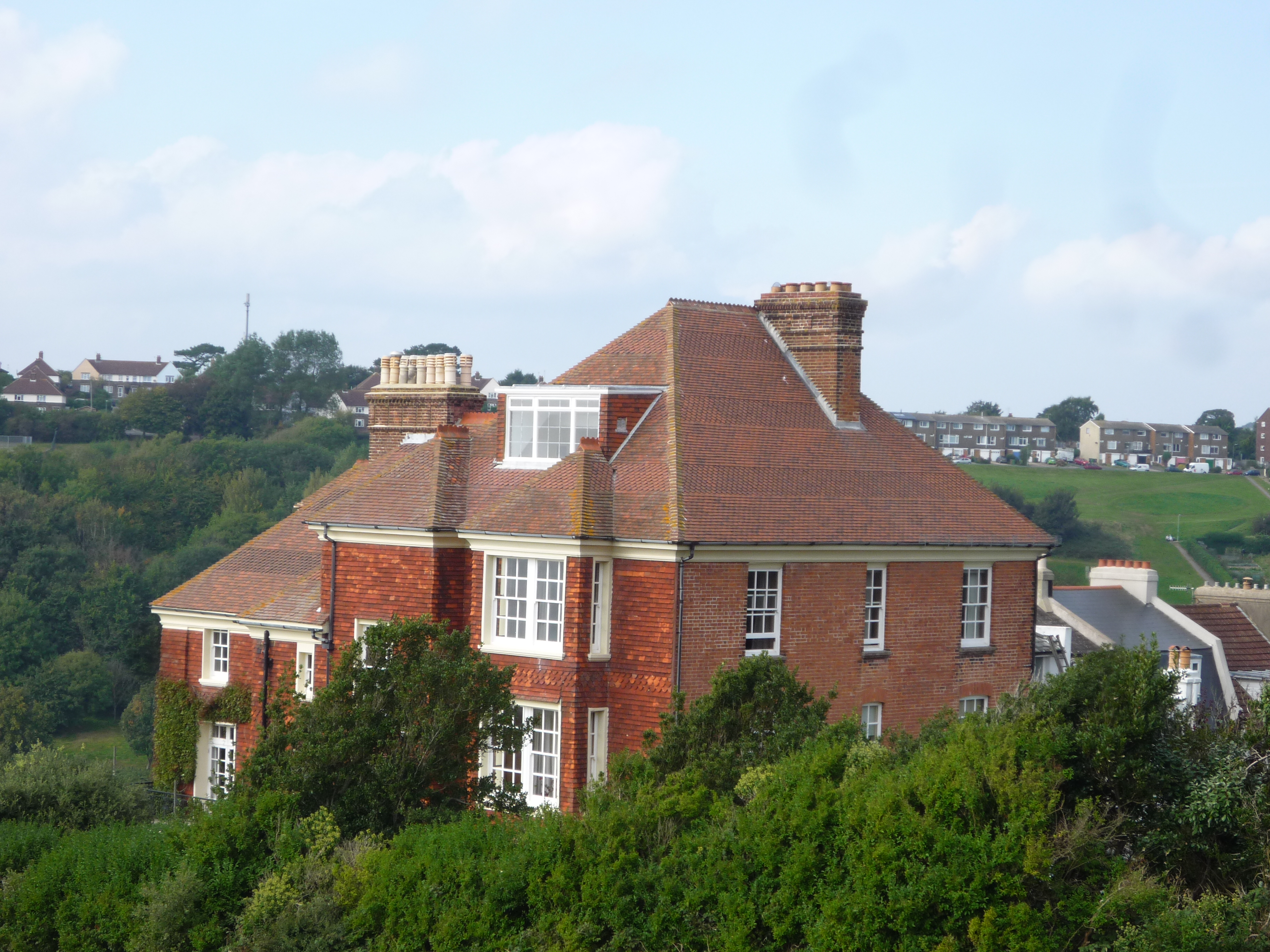
Windycroft house in 2014.

Windycroft is a Grade II* listed house in Hastings, East Sussex, England. It was built between 1883 and 1891 for Alex and Constantine Alexander Ionides, using the land from two previous properties.

== History ==
In 1880, art collectors Alex and Constantine Alexander Ionides bought 15 High Wickham in Hastings, East Sussex, England. In 1882, they bought 14 High Wickham. Using the land from these neighbouring properties, they built Windycroft, a house for their relative Edward Dannreuther. The work started in 1883, and was completed in 1891. The house was constructed using red brick, and had a tiled roof. The balconies contained iron balustrades. The house was decorated with William Morris wallpaper designs, and William Arthur Smith Benson provided the lighting for the house.

In 1892, Alexander Constantine Ionides' widow Euterpe Sgouta died at Windycroft. Edward Dannreuther lived in the house until his death in 1905. In 1911, the house was badly damaged by a fire. The house was sold by the Dannreuther family in 1978. In 1976, the house became a Grade II* listed building.
