= William Julius Eggeling =

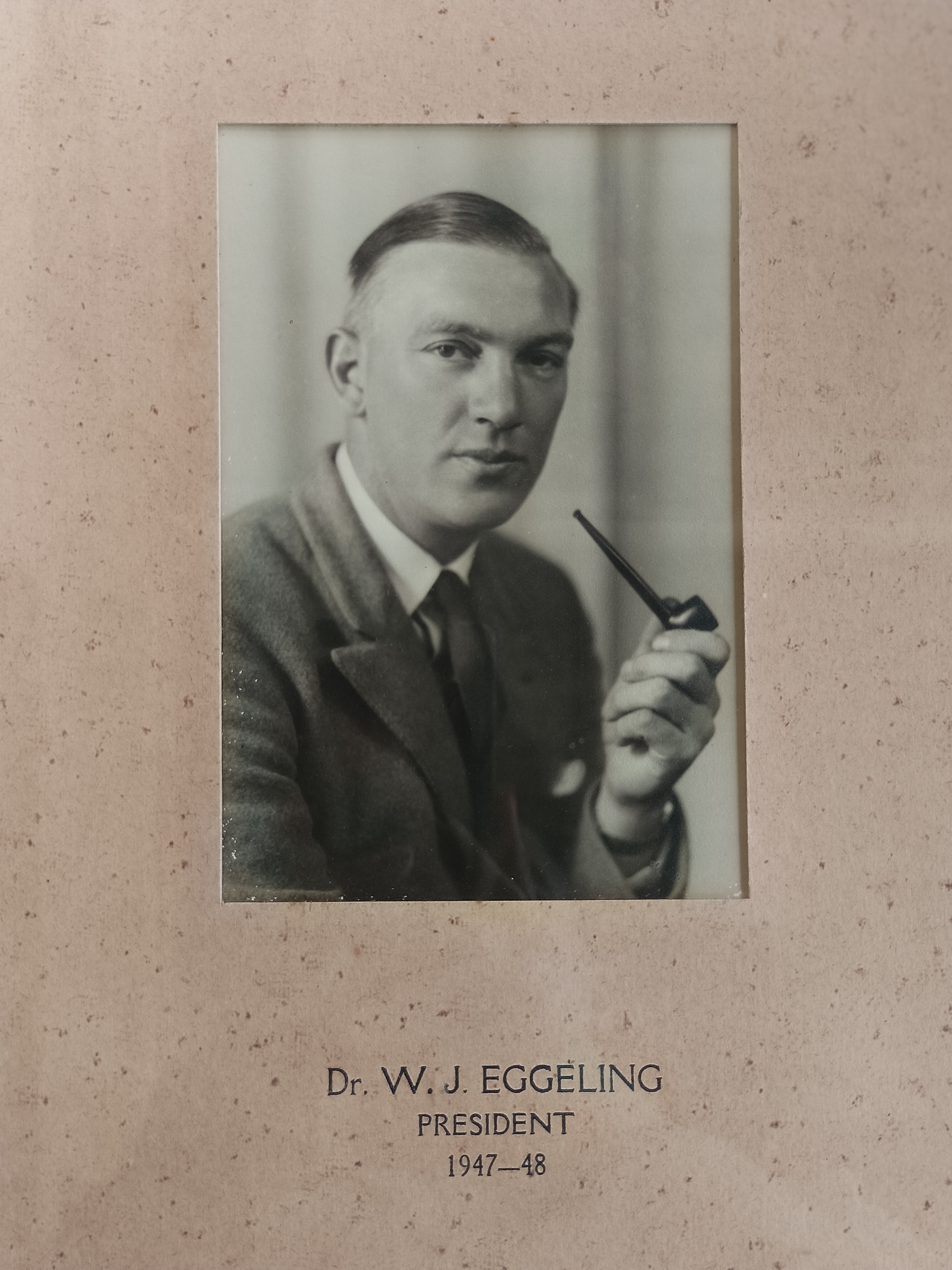
- Born: 18 July 1909; Upper Largo, Fife, Scotland
- Died: 10 February 1994 (aged 84); Perth, Scotland
- Education: University of Edinburgh; University of Oxford
- Occupations: naturalist, botanist, forester

Dr William Julius (Joe) Eggeling FRSE (18 July 1909 in Upper Largo, Fife – 10 February 1994 in Perth) was a Scottish-born forester, botanist, and naturalist. Eggeling was a dominant figure in the Uganda Forest Department in the 1930s and 1940s, and played an important role in nature conservation in Scotland during the 1950s and 1960s.

He also served as the 16th president of The Uganda Society.

== Life ==
'Joe' Eggeling was born the son of a doctor in Upper Largo in Fife. When seven years old and enrolled at Kirkton of Largo Parish School, he was bed-ridden for 18 months with tuberculosis of the hip. Despite this initial set back he rose to a distinguished career. Following St Mary's Preparatory School in Melrose, where he was Vice-Captain, Dux and Victor Ludorum, his schooling was completed at Giggleswick in Yorkshire. At the University of Edinburgh he graduated with a BSc in Forestry, and was awarded the Younger Medal in Practical Forestry, and three class medals for Indian and Colonial forestry, and forest mycology. In 1930-31 he attended the Colonial Service Postgraduate Course in Forestry at the University of Oxford.

Despite his educational focus on India, he joined the Uganda Forest Department in 1931, becoming Assistant Conservator. In the days preceding environmental sensitivity he arranged for the draining of a large papyrus swamp near Kampala in order to establish plantations of Eucalyptus for use as fuel. He regarded this as an opportunity to study the swamp vegetation and published the first of many works, "The Vegetation of Namanve Swamp, Uganda" in the Journal of Ecology in 1935.

At that time the government of Uganda had been stable for 40 years, with an economy based largely on coffee and cotton. The forests were regarded as just another resource to exploit. Eggeling was a leading figure in the survey of the natural forests of Uganda, and his management plan for the Budongo Forest in Bunyoro was seen as a milestone in tropical forestry. He gathered his accumulated experience in a revised edition of "Forestry in Uganda", the manual for trainees at the Uganda Forest School - this was one of the pioneer textbooks in African forestry.

By 1939 Eggeling had collected some 3800 specimens for the Royal Botanic Gardens, Kew and the British Museum (Natural History). The publication of his book The Indigenous Trees of Uganda in 1940 led to his being awarded a PhD from the University of Edinburgh. He supplied a large number of snake specimens to Charles Pitman, author of The Snakes of Uganda.

During World War II, in addition to his normal forestry duties, Eggeling managed the collecting of wild rubber by teams of workers spread throughout Uganda. In 1945 he succeeded Norman Brasnett as Head of the Ugandan Forest Department. Having placed forestry in Uganda on a sound footing by 1950, he was transferred to Tanganyika to do the same. The Forest Department had suffered from years of neglect and underfunding, and the Governor, Sir Edward Twining co-opted Eggeling to reorganise the Forest Department. He spent from 1950 to 1954 doing so and gave the Forest Department an efficient staff structure and created a serviceable organisation. Between 1945 and 1946, William Julius Eggeling was the president of The Uganda Society replacing Goroonwy. ap Griffith and he was replaced by Margaret Trowell.

In 1954 Eggeling retired from the Colonial Forest Service and returned to the United Kingdom, where he wrote and lectured on East Africa, and became a member of the advisory council of the Ngorongoro Conservation Area in Tanzania. Returning to Scotland in 1955, he became the Conservation Officer for Scotland, helping to establish and assisting in the management of many of the National Nature Reserves, which later formed part of the Scottish Natural Heritage. In 1965, he produced the first checklist of plants for the island of Rùm. Drawing on his forestry training he developed a management plan for National Nature Reserves which was subsequently adopted throughout the UK. His management plan for Rùm became a prototype of its kind, and was published in the first volume of the Journal of Applied Ecology in 1964. His love and experience of ornithology and botany earned him respect among naturalists, and he became a popular figure in the voluntary conservation movement.

Eggeling helped to found the Scottish Wildlife Trust in 1964 and became vice-president. He was also a Member of Council of the Royal Society for the Protection of Birds and Chairman of its Scottish Advisory Committee, and President of the Scottish Ornithologist Club between 1966 and 1969. He had an enduring interest in birds, was an enthusiastic bird-ringer, studying their migration. In 1967 he became Vice-Chairman of the Nature Reserves Committee of Northern Ireland, and in 1968 succeeded Dr Berry as Director (Scotland) of the Nature Conservancy. On retiring in 1970 he was elected a member of the Countryside Commission for Scotland, and was created a CBE in 1972.

After 19 years in Anstruther, where his wife's parents had retired, he and his wife moved to Dunkeld in 1973. He died in Perth.

== Botanical referencing ==
The orchid genus Eggelingia commemorates his name.

== Family ==
In 1939 he married Jessie Elizabeth Tothill (d.1988), daughter of Dr John Douglas Tothill (1888-1969), CMG, Director of Agriculture in the Sudan, who had filled a similar post in Uganda. Jessie accompanied her husband on most of his trips in Africa, and thereafter in the UK, raising a family of three daughters and two sons.

== Publications ==
- The Vegetation of Namanve Swamp, Uganda (1935)
- Fifteen Uganda timbers (1939)
- The Indigenous Trees of Uganda (1940)
- An annotated list of the grasses of the Uganda Protectorate (1942)
- Elementary forestry: A first textbook for forest rangers (1949)
- The Indigenous Trees of the Uganda Protectorate (1951)
- Forestry in Tanganyika, 1946-50 (1951)
- The Isle of May (1960)
- Checklist of plants on Rùm
- When I was Younger: A Forest Officer's Memories of Uganda in the Thirties (1987)
