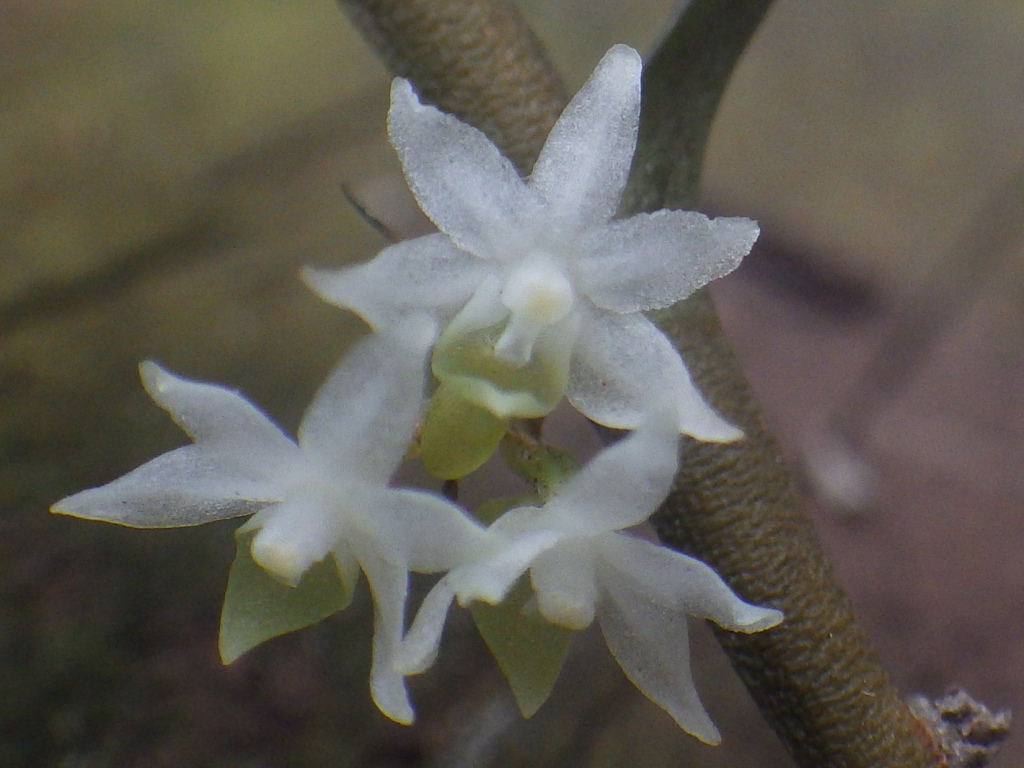
- Eggelingia gabonensis

Scientific classification
- Kingdom: Plantae
- Clade: Tracheophytes
- Clade: Angiosperms
- Clade: Monocots
- Order: Asparagales
- Family: Orchidaceae
- Subfamily: Epidendroideae
- Tribe: Vandeae
- Subtribe: Angraecinae
- Genus: Eggelingia; Summerh.

= Eggelingia =

Genus of plants

Eggelingia is a genus of flowering plants from the orchid family, Orchidaceae, and named after the Scots forester, William Julius Eggeling. It contains 3 known species, all native to tropical Africa:

- Eggelingia clavata Summerh.
- Eggelingia gabonensis P.J.Cribb & Laan
- Eggelingia ligulifolia Summerh.

== See also ==
- List of Orchidaceae genera
