= Largo Bay =

Bay on the coast of Fife, Scotland

Coordinates: 56°12′N 2°58′W

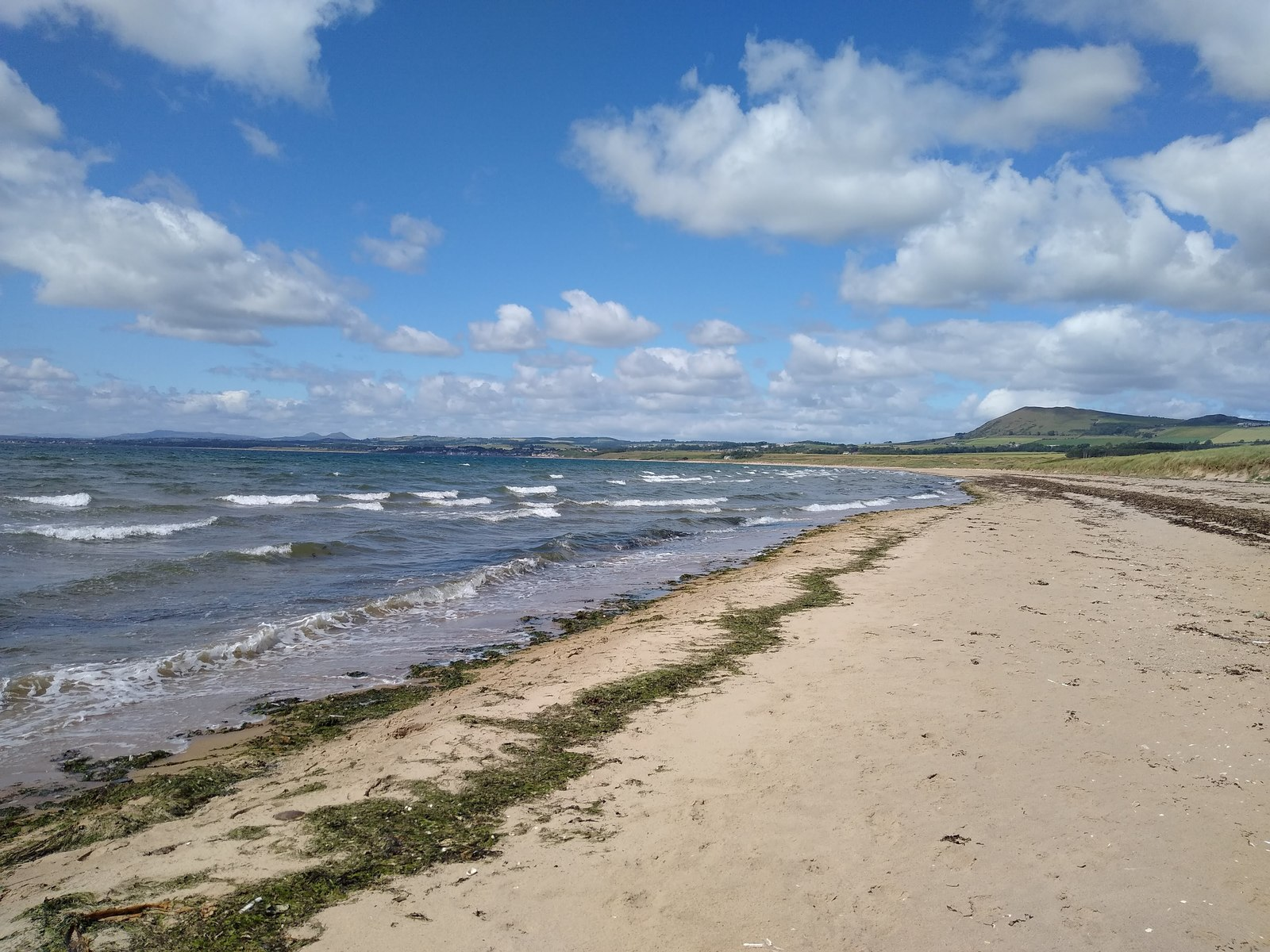
The beach at Largo Bay at high tide. View from the eastern end towards Largo Law. Lomond Hills far in the background.

Largo Bay is a bay on the northern shore of the Firth of Forth, on the coast of Fife, Scotland.

Lower Largo is a village right on the bay, with small harbour. Upper Largo is adjacent, just inland and above the bay and at the foot of Largo Law (an extinct volcano). The Fife Coastal Path, which is a long distance footpath from Kincardine to Newburgh, runs along the side of the bay. There is also a racehorse named Largo Bay after the location, currently trained by Michael Madgwick and owned by Joe Lane.
