= Upper Largo =

Coordinates: 56°13′13″N 2°55′41″W

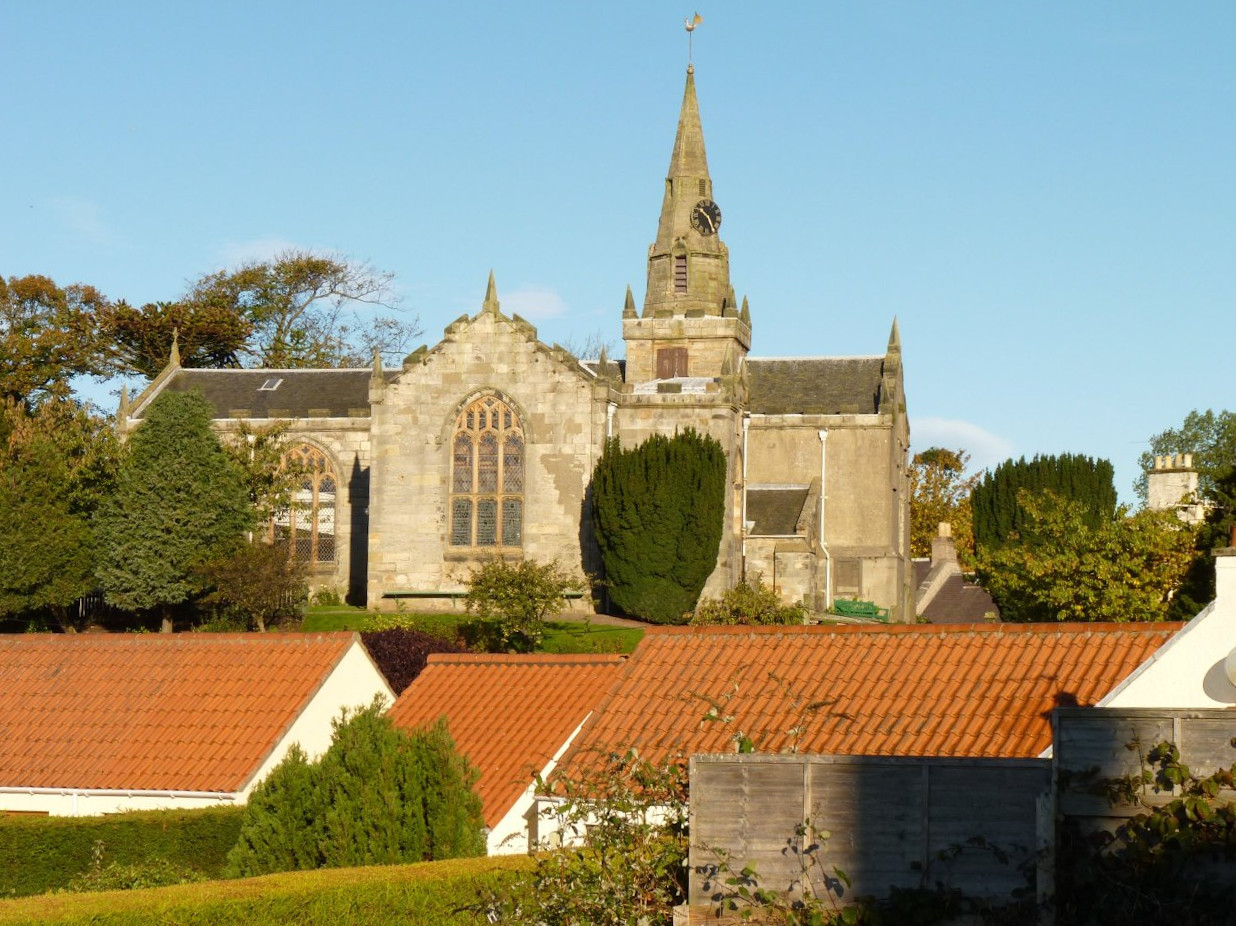
- Largo Kirk

- Location within Fife
- Civil parish: Largo
- Council area: Fife
- Country: Scotland
- Sovereign state: United Kingdom
- Police: Scotland
- Fire: Scottish
- Ambulance: Scottish

Upper Largo or Kirkton of Largo is a village in the parish of Largo, near the East Neuk of Fife, Scotland. It rests on the southern slopes of Largo Law, half a mile north of Largo Bay and the rather larger village of Lower Largo. It is the home of Largo Cricket Club.

== Location ==
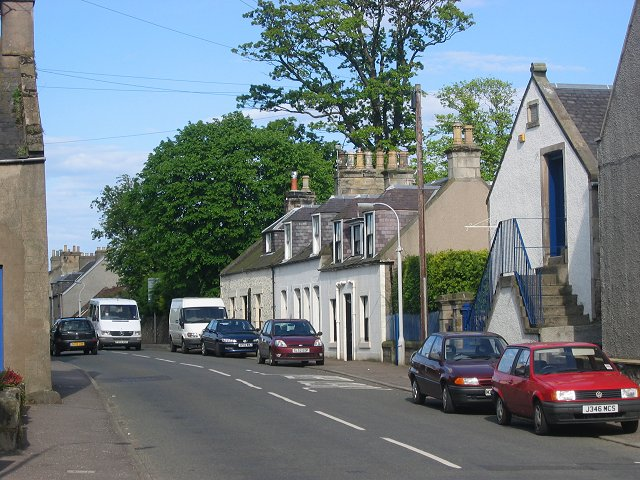
Main Street looking east

To traffic passing through Upper Largo it can be mistaken for a single street (this is Main Street) of mostly stone built shops and houses. A junction in the centre of this street leads either north-east towards St Andrews along the A915 road or east along the coast on the A917.

At the western end of Main Street is the Upper Largo Hotel and a ship's chandlery, in what was formerly the village garage and filling station. A minor road north of here leads to a small village green and the adjacent kirkyard of the Largo and Newburn Parish Church. The kirkyard is on a rise and affords good views over the rooftops of the village, and of the houses and cottages on the north side of the green.

Further east along Main Street there is a minor road heading south off Main Street. This residential street turns sharply to the right and rejoins Main Street at the very western edge of the village. The houses on the street offer views over Largo Bay and across The Firth of Forth to Edinburgh and East Lothian.

On the very eastern edge of the village is Buckthorns farm and Buckthorns Farmhouse.

== John Wood's Hospital ==
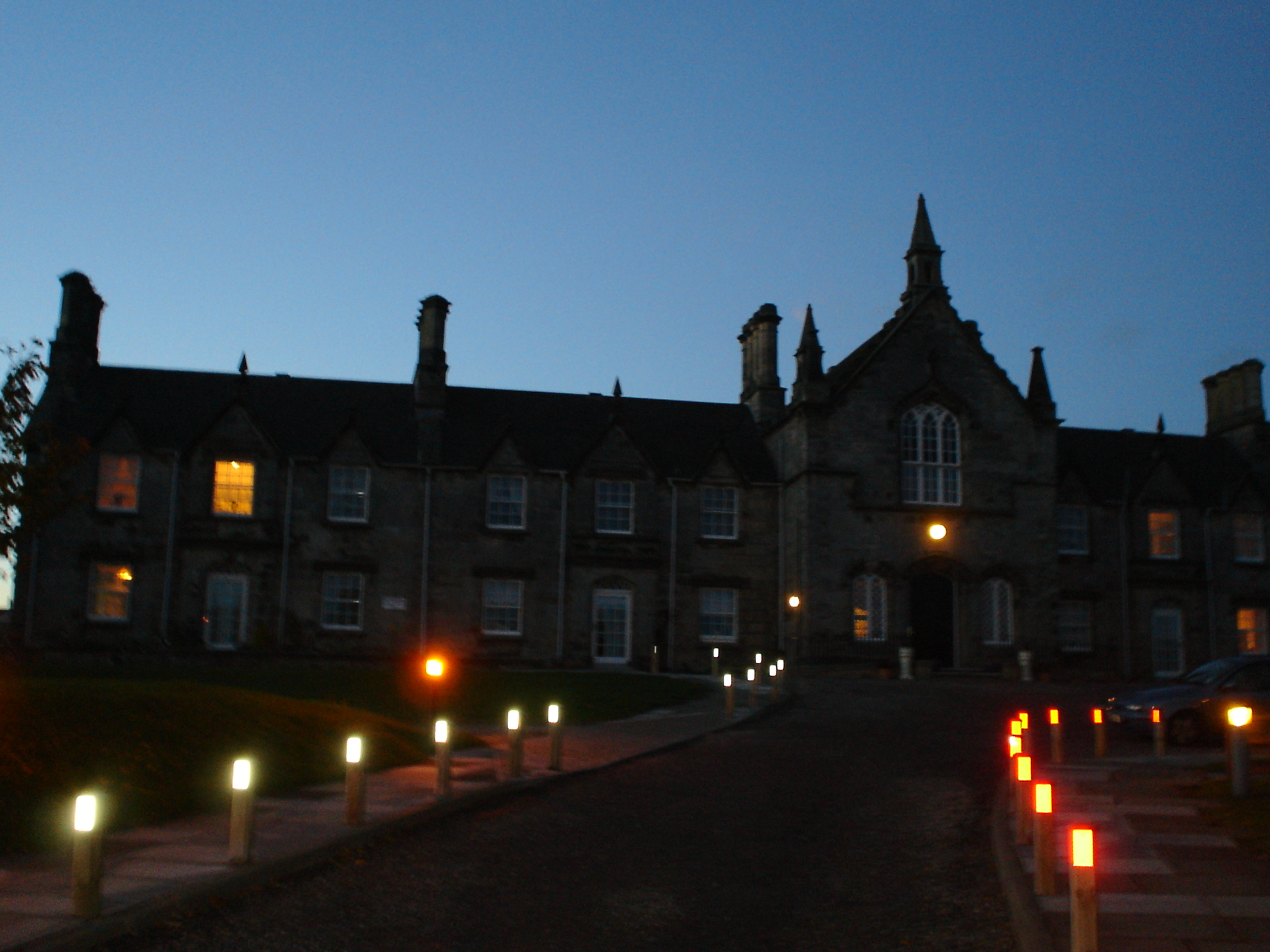
John Wood's Hospital

Along the St Andrews road is one of Upper Largo's most impressive buildings, John Wood's Hospital, which was founded in 1659 or 1665 as an almshouse or hospital for old men sharing the surname of its founder, John Wood. It was renovated in 1975 as part of a wider development of the site that saw more than ten residences built nearby, which now form sheltered housing.

== Sir Andrew Wood ==
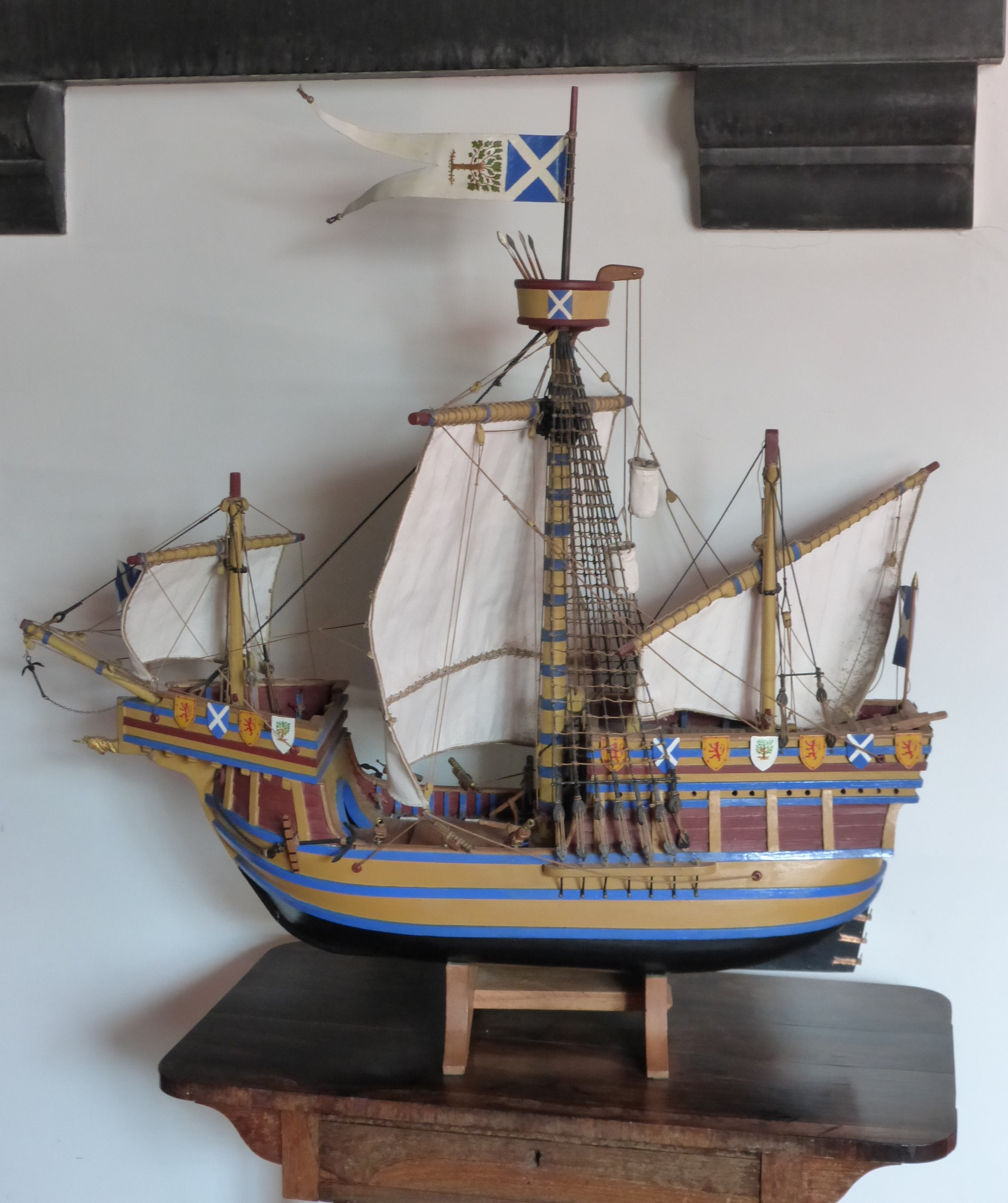
Model of Wood's flagship, the Yellow Carvel, in Largo Kirk

Sir Andrew Wood, often referred to as the Scottish Nelson, made his name in battles against the English fleet in the years around 1500, and in recognition of his feats he was given estates in this part of Fife by James III and James IV.

He lived in the medieval Largo House, of which only a tower now remains, three hundred yards west of the parish church. The oldest part of today's church dates back to 1623, but it was clearly built on the site of an earlier one. Sir Andrew linked his house and the church with what is believed to be Scotland's earliest canal, built so he could be rowed to church in his personal barge each Sunday in a manner befitting a naval hero.

== Largo House ==
The fortalice of the medieval Largo House was replaced as the laird's residence by the nearby Palladian Largo House built c. 1750 by James Durham. This now stands as a shell after being partially demolished by Charles Brand of Dundee Ltd in 1951, on the instructions of the owners, the Maitland-Makgill-Crichton family of Monzie Castle, Crieff, to avoid having to pay rates. The main block of the house is attributed to James Adam but recent research indicates that it may actually have been designed by John Douglas, an equally important architect and contemporary of the Adams. Further wings were added in 1814 and 1831 by General James Durham, who had his coat of arms placed on the tympanum.

== Largo Law ==
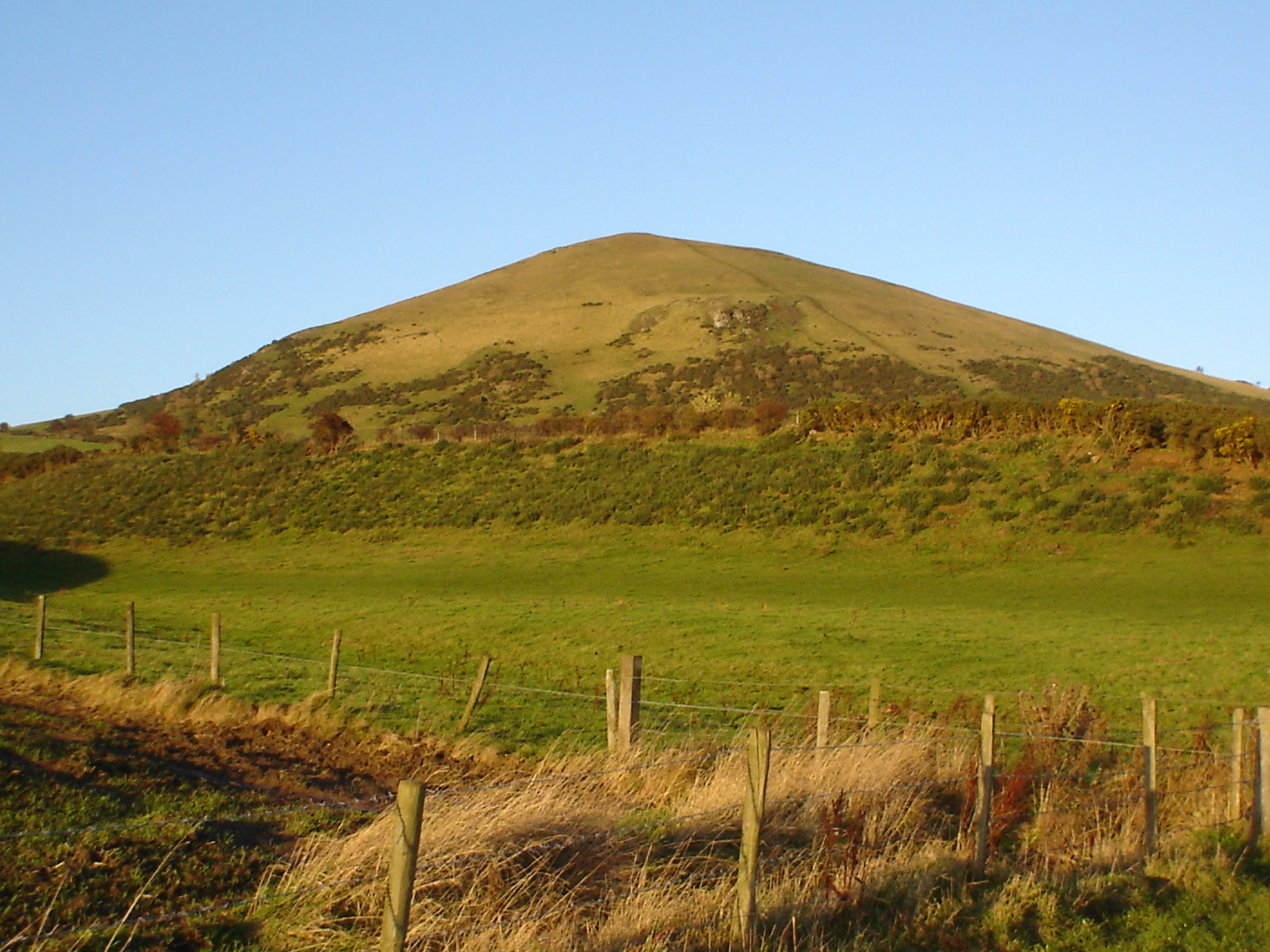
Largo Law

Largo Law rises to 290 metres (950 ft), is conical in shape and is the remains of a volcanic plug. It is easily ascended from Upper Largo, to the south, starting at NO 423037, where there is a cemetery, an information board and parking space. The route passes between the steadings of Chesterstone Farm before directly ascending the hill's steep south face.

The outlier of Flagstaff or Crescent Hill is on a ridge to the east of the main summit, 2 km distant. A prehistoric barrow sits on the summit.

== Notable people ==
- Dr William Julius Eggeling, naturalist
- Doon Mackichan, comedian and actress.
- Admiral Sir Philip Charles Henderson Calderwood Durham

== Pictish Cross-slab ==
Now located just within the entrance to the churchyard of the Parish Church, this Class 2 Pictish Stone is incised with a cross and Pictish symbols on one face and a hunting scene and Pictish symbols, including a double disc and Z-rod and a Pictish beast, on the other.
