= Aglaia Coronio =

British art collector (1834–1906)

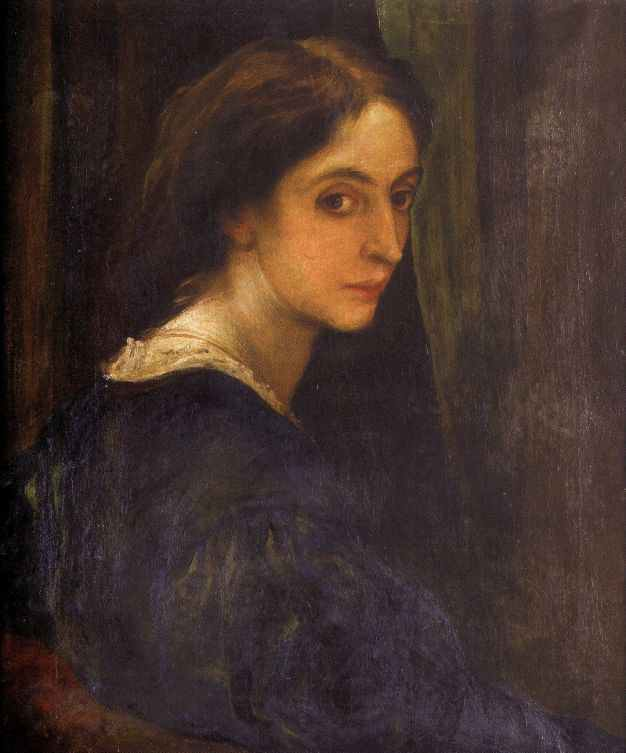
Aglaia Coronio portrait by George Frederic Watts circa 1874.

Aglaia Coronio (née Ionides; 1834 – 20 August 1906, Greek: Αγλαΐα Κορωνιού) was a British embroiderer, bookbinder, art collector and patron of the arts.

== Family life ==
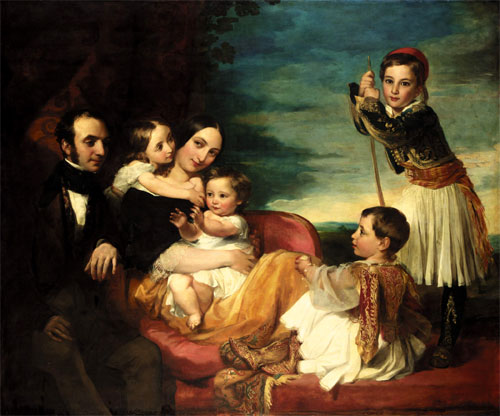
The Ionides Family, by George Frederic Watts, 1840 (Watts Gallery) – Aglaia is the fourth figure from the left

Of Greek descent, she was the elder daughter of businessman and art collector Alexander Constantine Ionides, who had immigrated to London from Constantinople (present day Istanbul) in 1827. Her older brother was Constantine Alexander Ionides (b. 1833); her younger siblings were Luca or Luke (b. 1837), Alexander or Alecco (b. 1840) and Chariclea Anthea Euterpe (b. 1844).

From 1854 to 1866, her father served as Consul General in London, and she handled the receptions for him. She was known at the time as one of the most graceful and intelligent women of her era.

The Ionides family opened their home, 1 Holland Park, to London's artistic and intellectual circles. Aglaia had a friendly personality and kept correspondence with many of these family friends, including Alma Tadema, John Stuart Mill, Ford Maddox Brown, Samuel Butler, Thomas Hood, Ellen Terry, Frederic Leighton, George Sand, William Wordsworth, Sir Edwin Landseer, John Ruskin, Beerbohm Tree, George du Maurier, and Fantin Latour, among others.

== Influence within artistic movements ==
=== Pre-Raphaelite Brotherhood ===
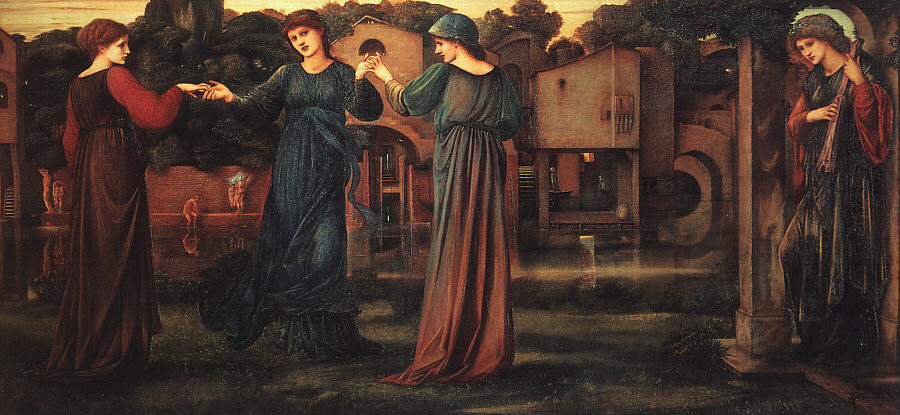
"The three graces" (left to right: Maria Zambaco, Marie Spartali Stillman, and Aglaia Coronio) featured in Edward Burne-Jones' The Mill, 1882.

Within artistic circles, Aglaia Coronio and her two cousins (Maria Zambaco and Marie Spartali Stillman) were known as "the Three Graces", after the Charites of Greek mythology (the youngest of whom was also "Aglaia"). Along with her cousins, Coronio modeled for many of the Pre-Raphaelite artists including Dante Gabriel Rossetti, Edward Burne-Jones, Holman Hunt, and John Millais. All three cousins are featured in Edward Burne-Jones' The Mill. Being friends with Burne-Jones, Coronio would consult him regarding fashion designs, and he would send her sketches.

=== Friendship with William Morris ===
Aglaia Coronio had a close, platonic friendship with William Morris, an artist closely connected with the Arts and Craft movement. They wrote many correspondences to each other throughout their lives. Coronio became a confidante to Morris on personal and artistic matters. Morris sought her comfort and sympathy during the most turbulent times in his marriage when his wife, Jane Morris, and Dante Gabriel Rossetti had an affair.

== Artistic creator ==
=== Bookbinder ===
Through her acquaintance with Morris, Coronio learned how to bind books. While none of her books have been recovered, Morris recorded her progress within his letters. Coronio is reportedly one of the first women to become a bookbinder in the late nineteenth century. Morris taught her about Chaucer. Due to accounts of women like Jane Morris and Georgiana Burne-Jones occasionally working at the Kelmscott Press, it could be assumed that Aglaia Coronio, with her background in bookbinding, might have assisted as well.

=== Embroiderer ===
Aglaia Coronio was recognized for her skill as an embroiderer. Coming from a family of textile traders, she was intrigued with Morris' textiles. In partnership with Morris, Coronio worked not only as an artistic consultant but also as an embroiderer of some of his patterns. She contributed to the embroidery of “mediaeval-like curtains which [Morris] designed for the intention of Alexander Ionides’s wife”. Although her embroidery has not been easily located, records report that her work was displayed during the Arts and Craft Exhibition on October 4, 1888 in the New Gallery. Coronio understood and most likely helped with the processes of dying thread, a method described by Morris in various letters. Through her family's textile trade, Coronio occasionally provided Morris with rarer wools or dyes.

== Art collector ==
In similar fashion to her older brother and father, Aglaia Coronio participated as a patron of the arts while she grew her collection of artwork. She possessed several paintings created by her acquaintance James McNeill Whistler. She was listed as a collector lender for the 1885 Arab and Persian exhibition. Some scholars attribute William Morris' interest of the Oriental motifs and colors to Coronio's influence.

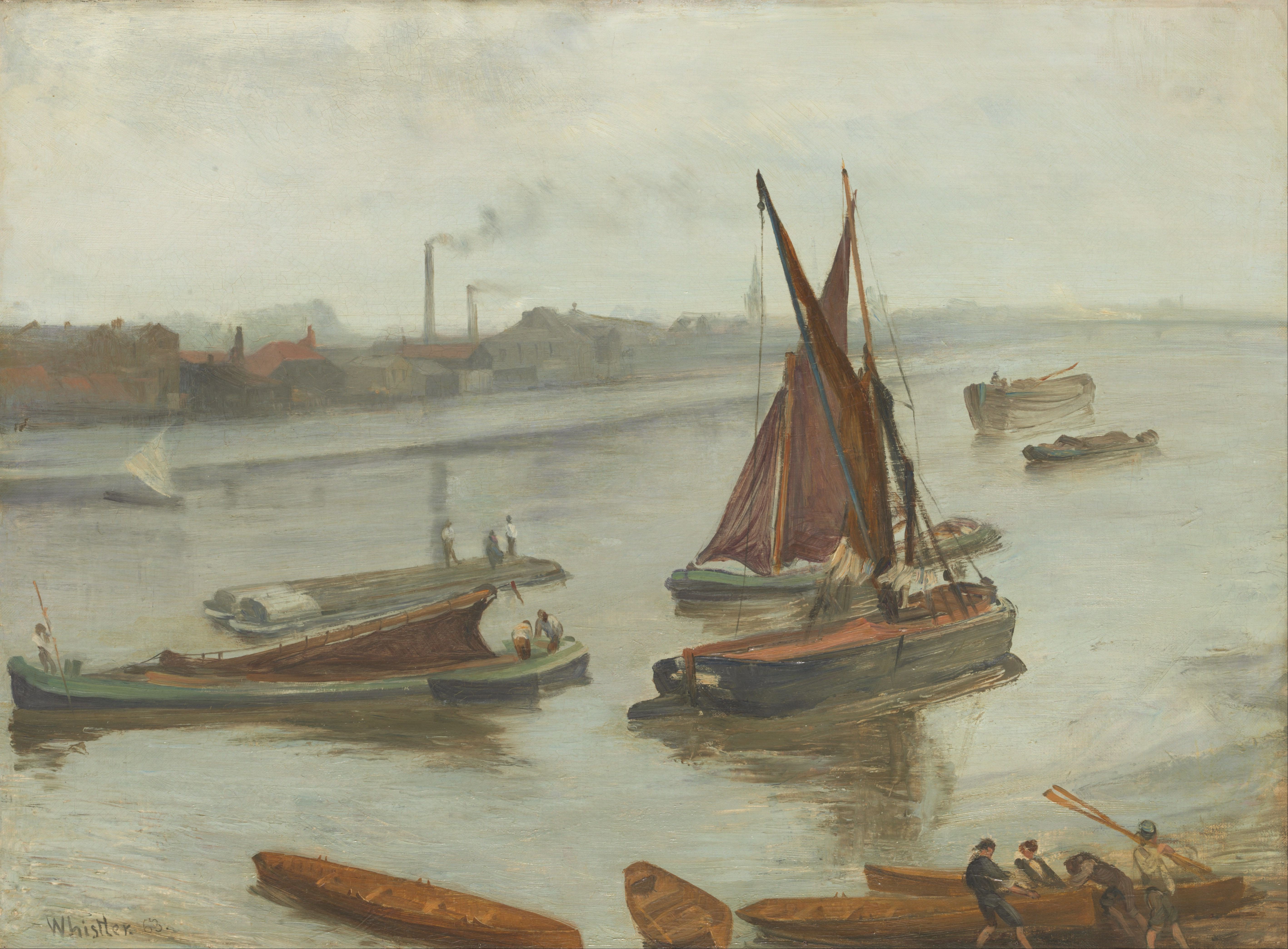
James McNeill Whistler, Grey and Silver - Old Battersea Reach, 1863. By 1892, this painting belonged to Aglaia Coronio.

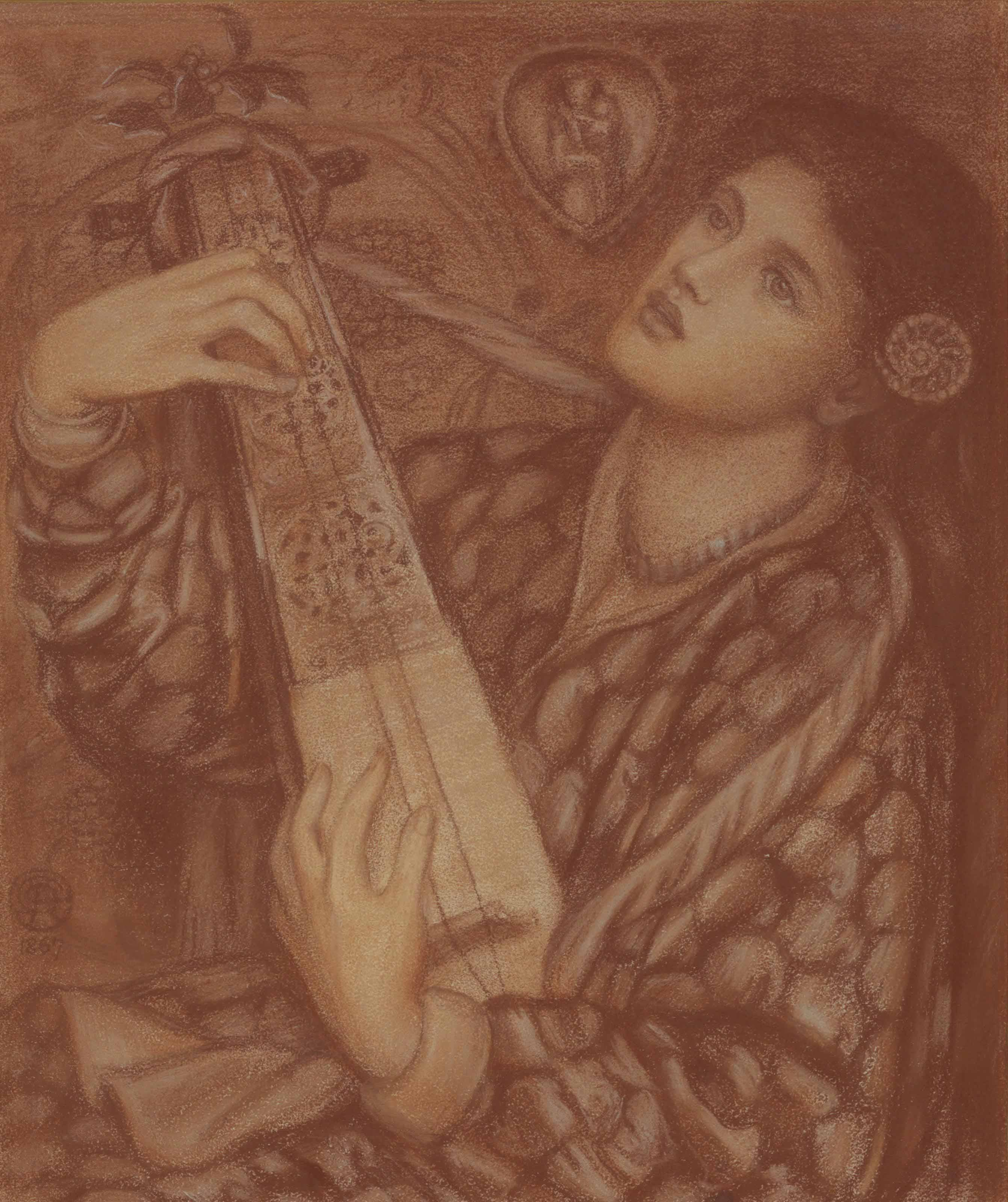
Dante Gabriel Rossetti, A Christmas Carol (chalk), 1867. Aglaia Coronio was the first to acquire this piece.

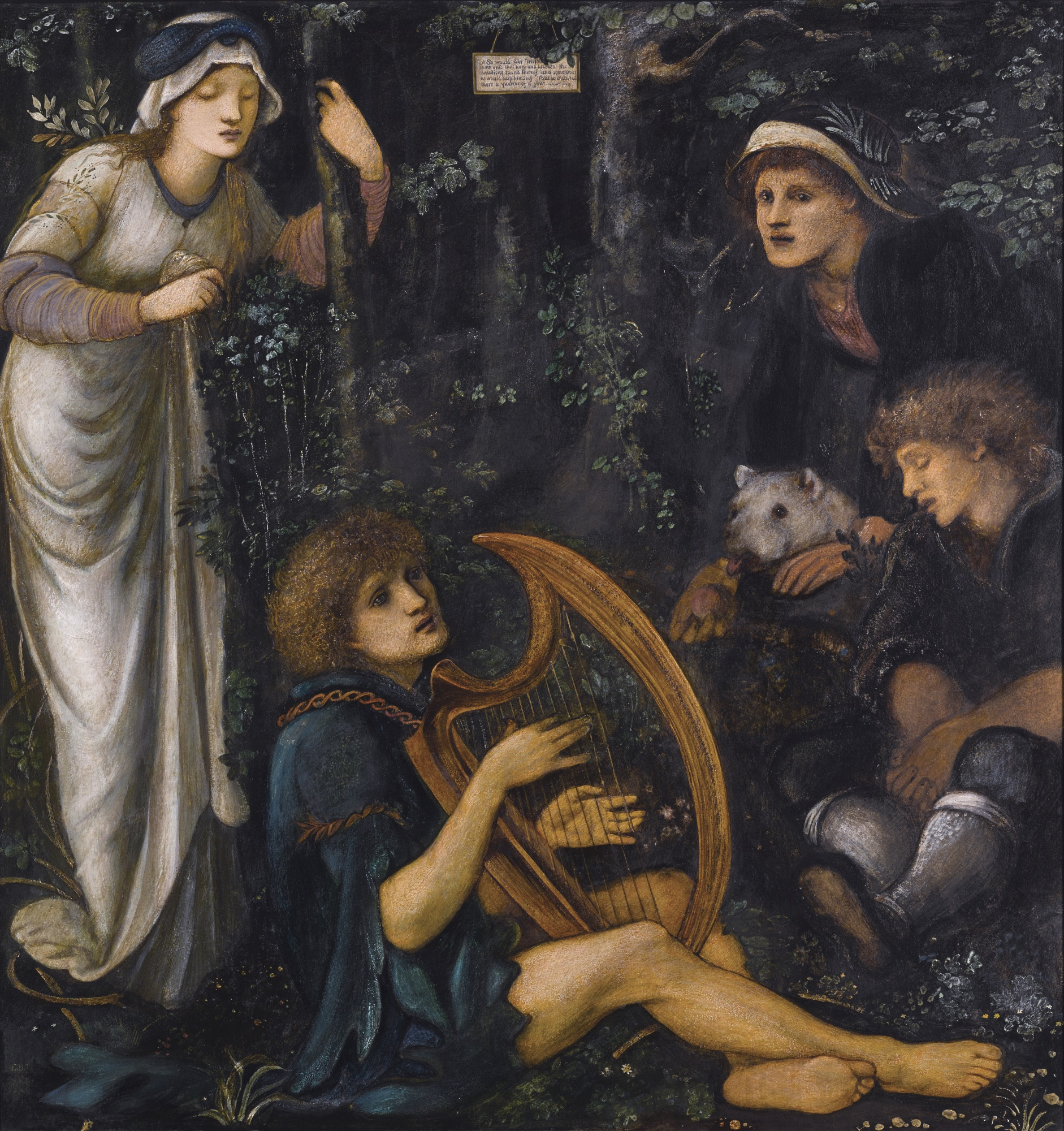
Edward Burne-Jones, The Madness of Sir Tristram, circa 1892. Aglaia Coronio acquired this painting in 1893.

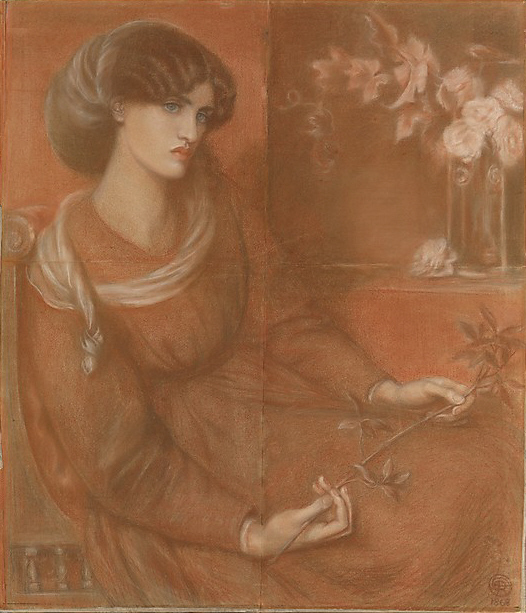
Dante Gabriel Rossetti, Mariana, 1868. This chalk study was part of Aglaia Coronio's collection.

== Later life ==
She married Theodore John Coronio on 1 September 1855. They had two children, Calliope "Opie" Despina (1856-1906) and John Coronio (1857-1910). Aglaia Coronio's daughter died 19 August 1906. So consumed with grief Coronio took her own life, the next day, by stabbing herself in the neck and chest with a pair of scissors.
