= Amblyodipsas katangensis =

Scientific classification
- Kingdom: Animalia
- Phylum: Chordata
- Class: Reptilia
- Order: Squamata
- Suborder: Serpentes
- Family: Atractaspididae
- Genus: Amblyodipsas
- Species: A. katangensis

Binomial name
- Amblyodipsas katangensis de Witte & Laurent, 1942

Species of snake

Amblyodipsas katangensis, or the Katanga purple-glossed snake, is a species of rear-fanged mildly venomous snake in the family Lamprophiidae. The species is endemic to Africa.

== Subspecies ==
Two subspecies are recognized as being valid, including the nominotypical subspecies.

- Amblyodipsas katangensis ionidesi Loveridge, 1951
- Amblyodipsas katangensis katangensis de Witte & Laurent, 1942

== Geographic range ==
A. katangensis katangensis is found in the Democratic Republic of the Congo and Zambia. A. katangensis ionidesi is found in Tanzania.

== Etymology ==
The subspecific name, ionidesi, is in honor of British game warden Constantine John Philip Ionides (1901–1968), who was known as the "Snake Man of British East Africa".

== Reproduction ==
A. katangensis is oviparous.
