= Charles Pitman (game warden) =

British game warden, conservationist and herpetologist (1890-1975)

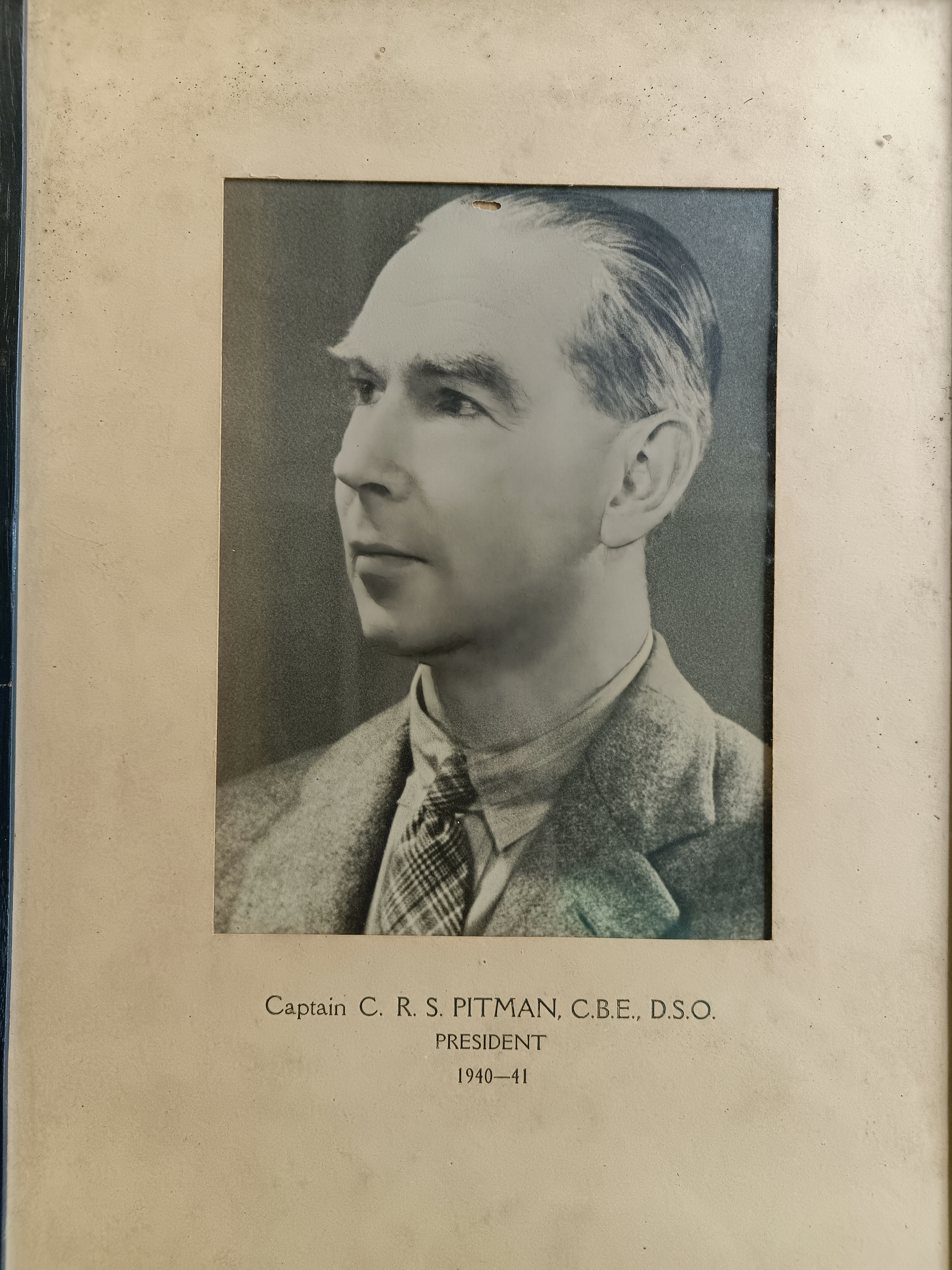
- Born: Charles Robert Senhouse Pitman; 19 March 1890; Bombay
- Died: 18 September 1975 (aged 85)
- Education: Royal Naval School
- Occupation: Herpetologist
- Title: President of the Uganda Society
- Term: 1940 - 1941
- Predecessor: Norman Vernon Brasnett
- Successor: Sserwano Ssenseko Wofunira Kulubya

Charles Robert Senhouse Pitman, DSO, MC (19 March 1890 – 18 September 1975) was a noted herpetologist, conservationist and friend of Joy Adamson.

== Early life ==
Charles Pitman was born in Bombay and educated at the Royal Naval School, Eltham, at Blundell's School in Tiverton, and at Royal Military Academy Sandhurst, which he left in 1909 having obtained a commission in the Indian Army.

== Military career ==
After a brief initial posting, Pitman joined the 27th Punjabis with which he stayed from 1910 to 1921 when he retired from the army to take up farming in Kenya. During his army career, which spanned the First World War, Pitman fought in Mesopotamia (where he was awarded the DSO and MC), and also in Egypt and France.

== Life in Africa ==
In 1924 Pitman was offered the position of Game Warden of the Uganda Protectorate. After his marriage to Marjorie Fielding Duncan, he assumed this post which he held from 1925 to 1951, interrupted only by three years (1931–1933) spent in Northern Rhodesia as Acting Game Warden and undertaking a faunal survey, and by five years (1941–1946) during which he was Director, Security Intelligence (Uganda).

In 1937 Pitman led Deneys Reitz, then the South African Minister of Agriculture and Forestry, on an elephant hunt at the invitation of the Administration of Uganda. Reitz was reluctant to kill an elephant and reported being pleased that the hunt failed after their quarry was off scared by a cyclist.

== Later life ==
After leaving Uganda in 1951, Pitman and his wife moved to London and during this time Pitman was very active with conservation and preservation groups such as the Elsa Foundation, the Fauna Preservation Society, and the Rare Breeds Survival Trust. He kept up an active correspondence with other naturalists such as Joy Adamson and C.J.P. Ionides.

== Writings and research ==
Correspondence was one of the primary ways in which Pitman conducted his zoological, herpetological, and ornithological research, as he relied almost solely on his own observations or the first-hand observations of others for data. This is particularly apparent in his files relating to the second edition of his Guide to the Snakes of Uganda (1974). This book, which was originally published in serial form in the Uganda Journal (1936–1937), is the foundation for Pitman's reputation as a methodical and exhaustive herpetologist. The Ugandan forester and naturalist, William Julius Eggeling, supplied a large number of snakes to Pitman. Pitman was not limited to one area of research, however, and planned to publish, and at the time of his death had completed the typescript of, a book on elephants. This was to have been illustrated with his own photographs, as were his other autobiographical books, A Game Warden Among His Charges (1931) and A Game Warden Takes Stock (1942). As well as books, Pitman published a plethora of articles, in scientific and popular journals, magazines and newspapers.

Pitman's work became known to the public through radio interviews and newspaper articles concerning East Africa and the need for game conservation.

Pitman's support of museum collections, especially the Hebrew University, Natural History Museum, Liverpool Museum, The Royal Albert Museum, Exeter, and the American Museum of Natural History, New York City, was generous and long-continued. For example, Pitman donated some three thousand meticulously documented clutches of eggs, to the Natural History Museum.

== The Pitman Collection ==
Charles Pitman's papers were given to the Natural History Museum in 1975 by his wife shortly following her husband's death and The Pitman Collection is catalogued on URICA under BRN 299618 (shelf mark Z MSS PIT).

Two folders of notes and correspondence on Uganda had been deposited by Pitman at the Rhodes House Library (part of the main Bodleian Library in Oxford. Rhodes House also holds a complete set of Annual Reports of the Game Department in Uganda which Pitman wrote from 1925 to 1951. A 12-inch LP disc, Birds of the Drakensberg by Henley and Pooley published in 1970, and a 6-inch Bird Sounds and Songs by Stannard published in 1971, as well as two unpublished acetate discs bearing recordings of Pitman talking about his conservation work, have been deposited with the British Library Sound Archive.

== Legacy ==
A species of lamprophiid snake, Prosymna pitmani, is named in honour of Charles Pitman.

== Publications ==
- A game warden among his charges. 1931. London: Nisbet & Co. Ltd. 336pp. LCCN: 32003884.
- A report on a faunal survey of Northern Rhodesia with especial reference to game, elephant control, and national parks. 1934. Government Printer (Livingstone). LCCN: 36014685.
- Pitman, C.R.S. 1938. A Guide to the Snakes of Uganda. Kampala: Uganda Society, Kampala, 102pp.
- A game warden takes stock. 1942. London: J. Nisbet. 287pp. LCCN: 43003441
- A Guide to the Snakes of Uganda. 1974. London: Codicote, Wheldon & Wesley, Ltd. 102 pp. ISBN 0-85486-020-7.

== Sources ==
- Obituary of Capt C. R. S. Pitman, The Times, Monday, 22 Sep 1975 (pg. 14; Issue 59507; col G)
- The National Archives, Records of The Pitman Collection; (1876–1975) held by the Natural History Museum
- History of the Herpetological Association of Africa, Donald G. Broadley, Published in African Herp News No. 25: October 1996
- The Letters of Joy Adamson, Extracted 11 August 2009
