= Constantine John Philip Ionides =

British-born hunter and amateur naturalist and herpatologist

- Born: 1901; Brighton and Hove, England, UK
- Died: 22 September 1968 (aged 66–67); Nairobi, Kenya
- Other names: Bobby, Iodine, C. J. P. Ionides, Snake Man of British East Africa
- Relatives: Constantine Alexander Ionides (grandfather); Constantine P. Cavafy (cousin)
- Military career
- Allegiance: United Kingdom
- Unit: South Wales Borderers

Constantine John Philip Ionides (1901–1968), nicknamed "Bobby" and then "Iodine", was a British-born naturalist and herpetologist known as the Snake Man of British East Africa. His decades as game warden (conservation officer) led to him being described as the father of the Selous Game Reserve in what is now Tanzania.

== Life ==
Constantine John Philip Ionides, known as "Bobby" from early childhood, was born in Hove, a suburb of Brighton, on the south coast of England. His father, Theodore (1866–1936), was a doctor from a well-established Anglo-Greek family, whose own father, Constantine Alexander Ionides, was a prominent art collector. His mother Aikaterini (1874–1960) was the daughter of a physician, John Cavafy (1838–1901), who worked with his own father, a Turkish merchant, in managing his art collection; the Cavafy family were important collectors of the paintings of Whistler. She spent some of her childhood living with this grandfather, who was the favourite uncle of Constantine P. Cavafy, held by some to be the greatest Greek poet since ancient times Aikaterini's mother, Bobby's grandmother, came from another prosperous Anglo-Greek family, one of three sisters memorialised in Ralli Hall. The young Bobby grew up in a town full of grandparents, uncles, aunts, and cousins.

He was sent to boarding school at the age of eight. His first biography describes the spartan drawbacks of this prep school, and the thoroughness of its corporal punishment regime. At about this time, he was impressed by the life of Frederick Selous, the hunter and conservationist whose real-life adventures inspired Sir Henry Rider Haggard to create the fictional Allan Quatermain character. Bobby decided that he too wished to become a professional hunter, and began to hunt the wild animals of the English countryside, and to teach himself taxidermy. He then attended Rugby under headmaster Albert David, but left early, by mutual agreement, after years of poaching and misdemeanours.

He attended crammers, finally getting in to Sandhurst military college in 1919, determined to follow an army career. In 1922 he was posted to the South Wales Borderers, whose arrival in India gave Ionides his first opportunity to study snakes. His soldiering took him to East Africa when he was in his mid-20s, and he rarely left the continent. He started by poaching during leaves of absence from soldiering, and learned to hunt big game of all sorts, including elephants (see Elephant hunting in Kenya). He left the army once his hunting became financially self-supporting, becoming a so-called white hunter, which for the most part involved guiding wealthy Americans. His specimens can be found in the collections of the British Museum, the National Museums of Kenya (in his day known as the Coryndon Memorial Museum), and Harvard's Museum of Comparative Zoology.

Ionides eventually found work as a game warden and worked his way up to managing the Selous Game Reserve. When ill health forced his retirement, he set up as a snake collector. He supplied not only zoological establishments, but also labs needing venomous snake in order to manufacture anti-venin.

He never married, holding his chosen occupation to be incompatible with family life. His ashes are buried in Selous, the reserve he shaped for much of his working life.

He was widely known as "a legend on account of his solitary life and his preoccupation and experience with African snakes". He is described as "colourful" and "iconoclastic" in The Eponym Dictionary of Reptiles

== Books ==
He was the subject of two full-length biographies. The first, Snake Man: The Story of CJP Ionides by Alan Wykes, was judged the author's most successful work. It was published by Hamish Hamilton, founded by his friend from Rugby Jamie Hamilton (publisher). The second, Life with Ionides by Margaret Lane, describes the months she spent at his spartan home in the bush, participating in his snake hunts. His own autobiography appeared in 1965, titled Mambas and Man Eaters: A Hunter's Story.

Peter Matthiessen's 1981 book Sand Rivers (ikkustrated by Hugo van Lawick) describes a foot safari into Selous, guided by Brian Nicholson, who had apprenticed under Ionides and succeeded him as warden in charge there. "Iodine" and the creation of the modern game reserve feature in many anecdotes. Ionides is referred to in several books by Peter Hathaway Capstick. and is one of four European men profiled in his 1992 The African Adventurers: A Return to the Silent Places.

== Legacy and influence ==
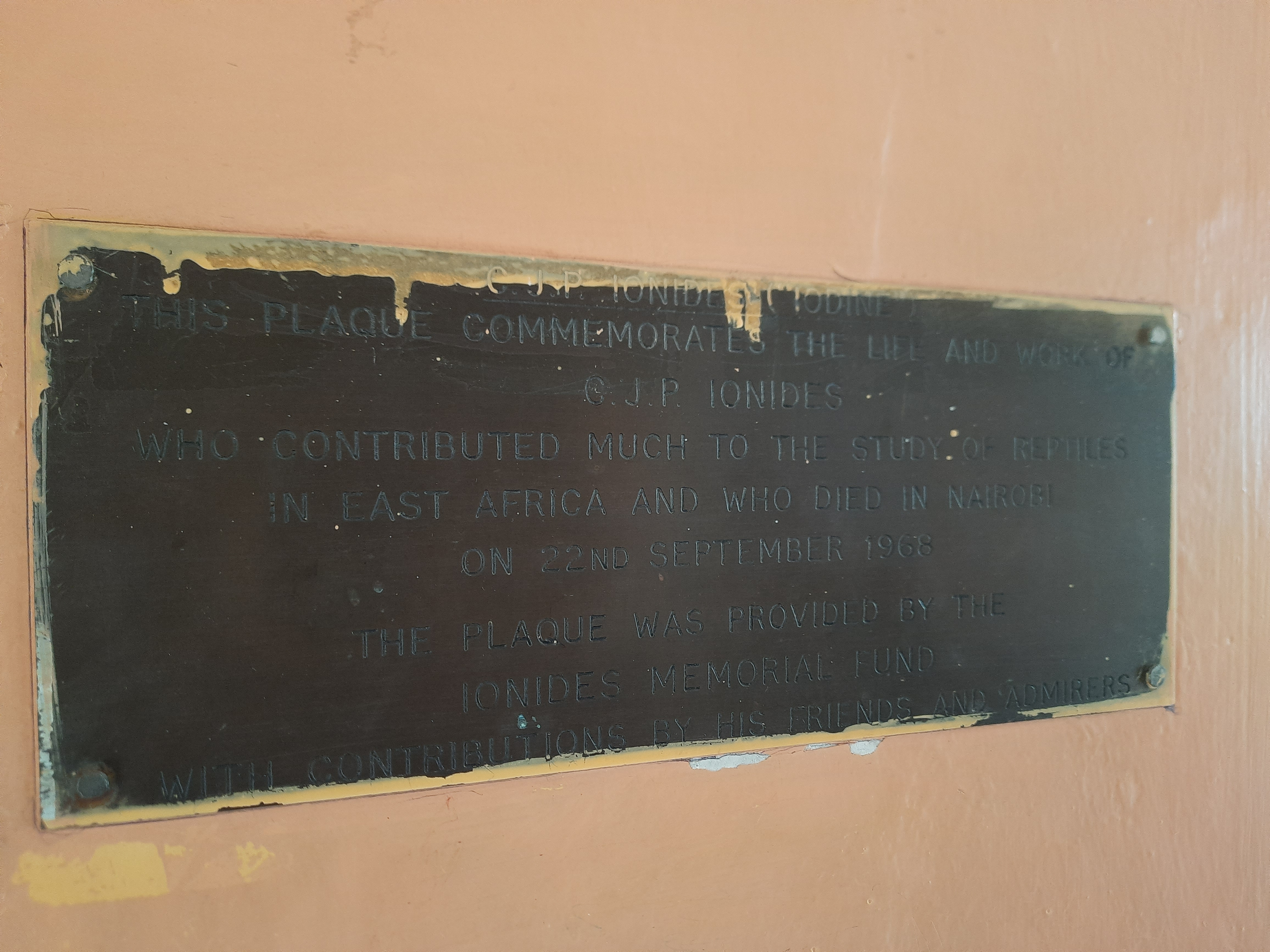
Plaque in the Snake Park and Aquarium of the Nairobi National Museum: "This plaque commemorates the life and work of C. J. P. Ionides who contributed much to the study of reptiles in East Africa and who died in Nairobi on 22nd September 1968. The plaque was provided by the Ionides Memorial Fund / with contributions by his friends and admirers."

The game warden Charles Pitman summed up the legacy of Ionides:

A field-worker of world-wide repute, indeed a legendary figure, unrivalled in his trade and unsurpassed in experience. [...] His personal bag of green mambas must have totalled at least ten thousand.

The Transactions of The Royal Society of Tropical Medicine and Hygiene published a summary of his dozen experiences with snakebite, only one of which Ionides treated with antivenom. Mark O'Shea credited Ionides with inspiring his own career as a herpetologist, and Jonathan Kingdon acknowledges his influence. Even in 2020, scholars such as evolutionary biologist Richard Shine and Stephen Spawls, author of The Dangerous Snakes of Africa, cite Ionides as a "pioneering East African naturalist" and use his field notebooks for analysis half a century after his death.

Several reptiles are named after him. The Liwale round-snouted worm lizard was given its official Linnean name, Loveridgea ionidesii, in honor of Arthur Loveridge and Ionides; the specific name ionidesii was given by James Clarence Battersby of the British Museum (Natural History). Loveridge created the binomial Brookesia ionidesi for the zomba pygmy chameleon (a synonym of Rieppeleon brachyurus). Loveridge also recognised his colleague in the name of a subspecies of the Katanga purple-glossed snake (Amblyodipsas katangensis ionidesi), and the Kilwa sharp-snouted worm lizard (Ancylocranium ionidesi). In 1964 the Belgian herpetologist Raymond Laurent named the black-throated monitor, a subspecies of the monitor lizard, Varanus exanthematicus ionidesi. Donald George Broadley and Van Wallach in 2007 named a newly described species of blind snake Leptotyphlops ionidesi, now Myriopholis ionidesi. On 31 July 1996, a plaque dedicated to Ionides was erected in the Nairobi Snake Park.

== Notes ==
Note 1: Ionides's notebooks show that he captured thousands of specimens of two species of green mamba: the eastern green mamba (Dendroaspis angusticeps) and Jameson's mamba (Dendroaspis jamesoni).
