= Greek dress =

Clothing of the Greek people

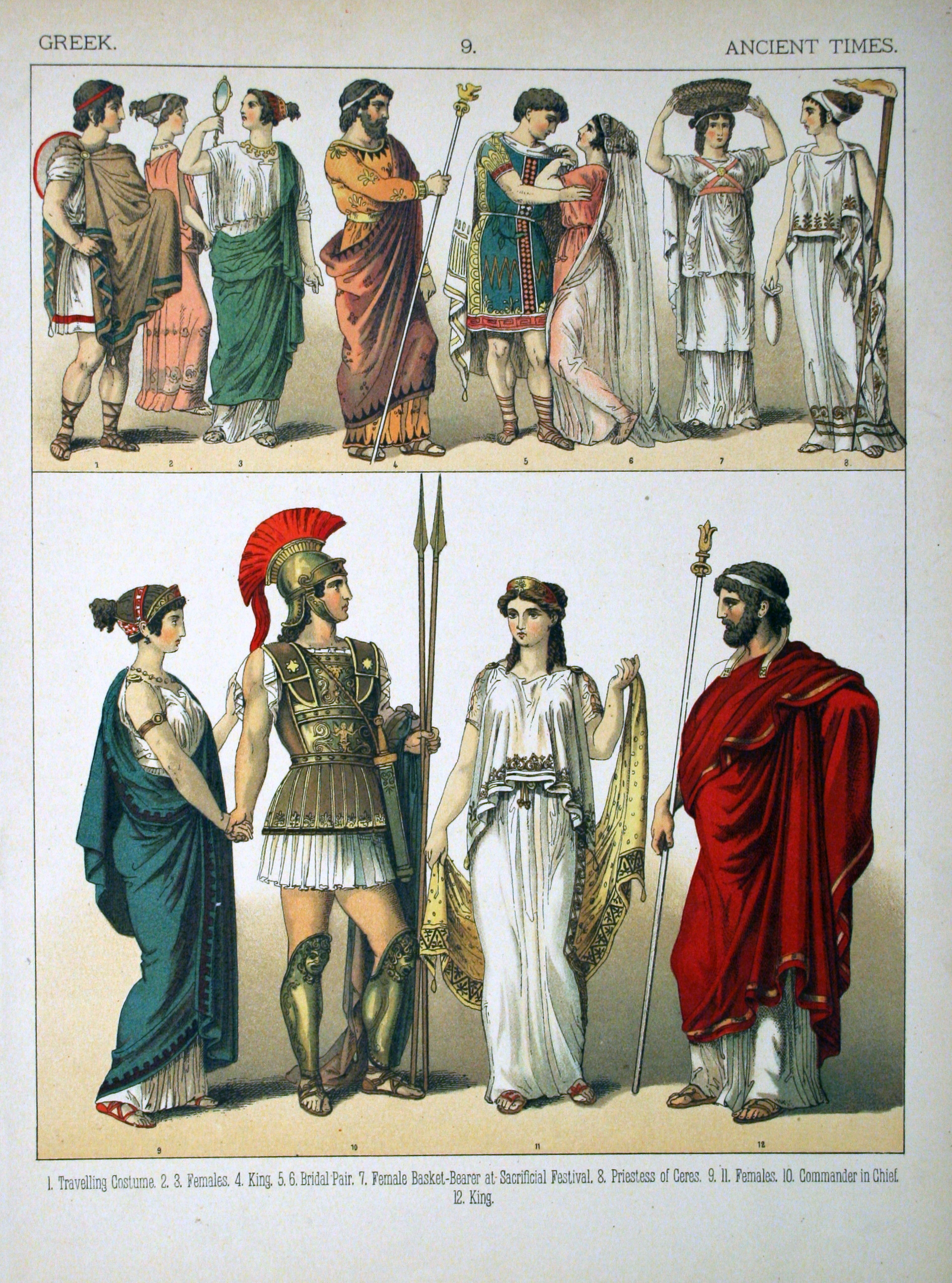
Ancient Greeks depicted in variety of different costumes.

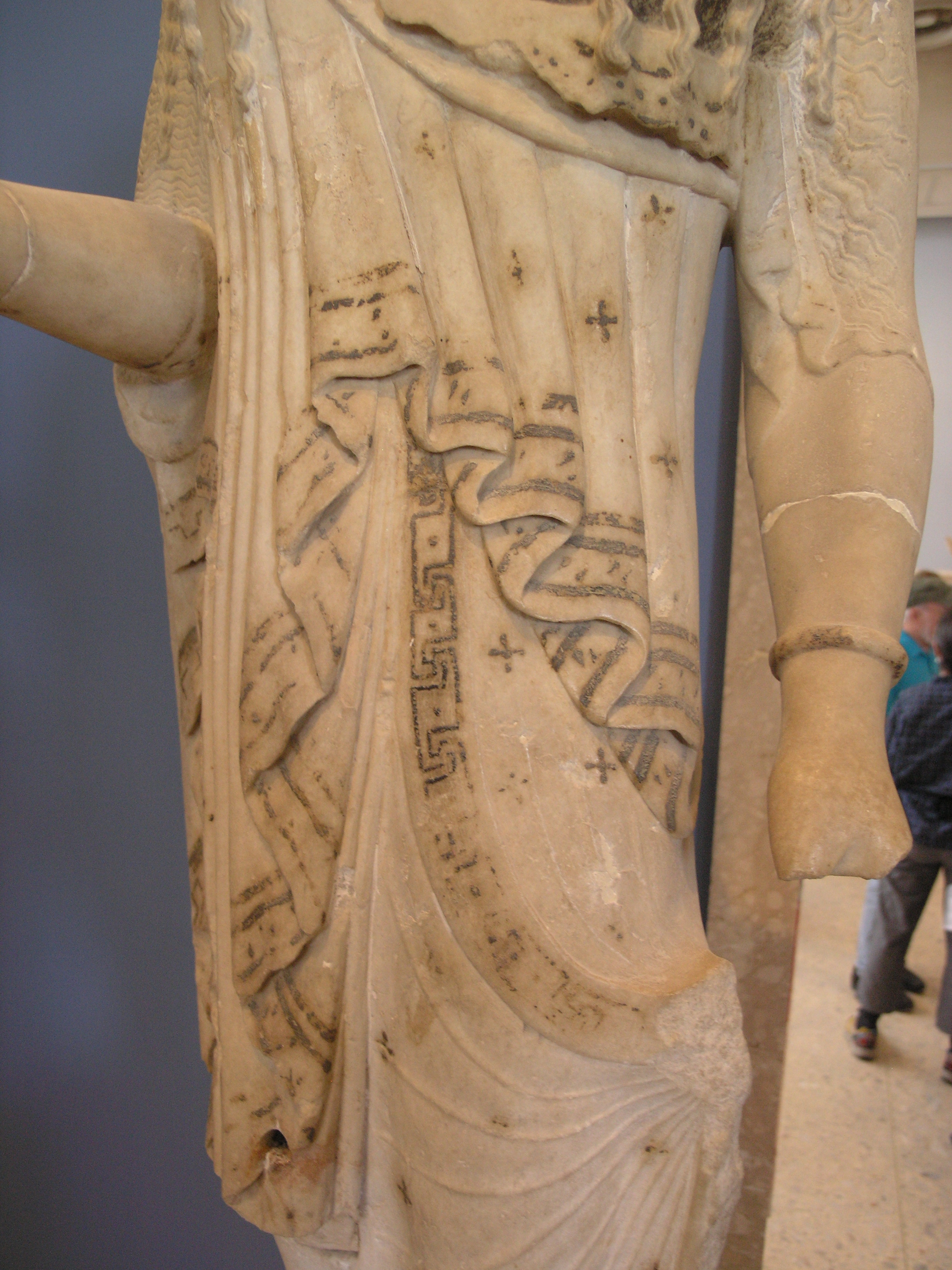
Detail of a Kore's dress

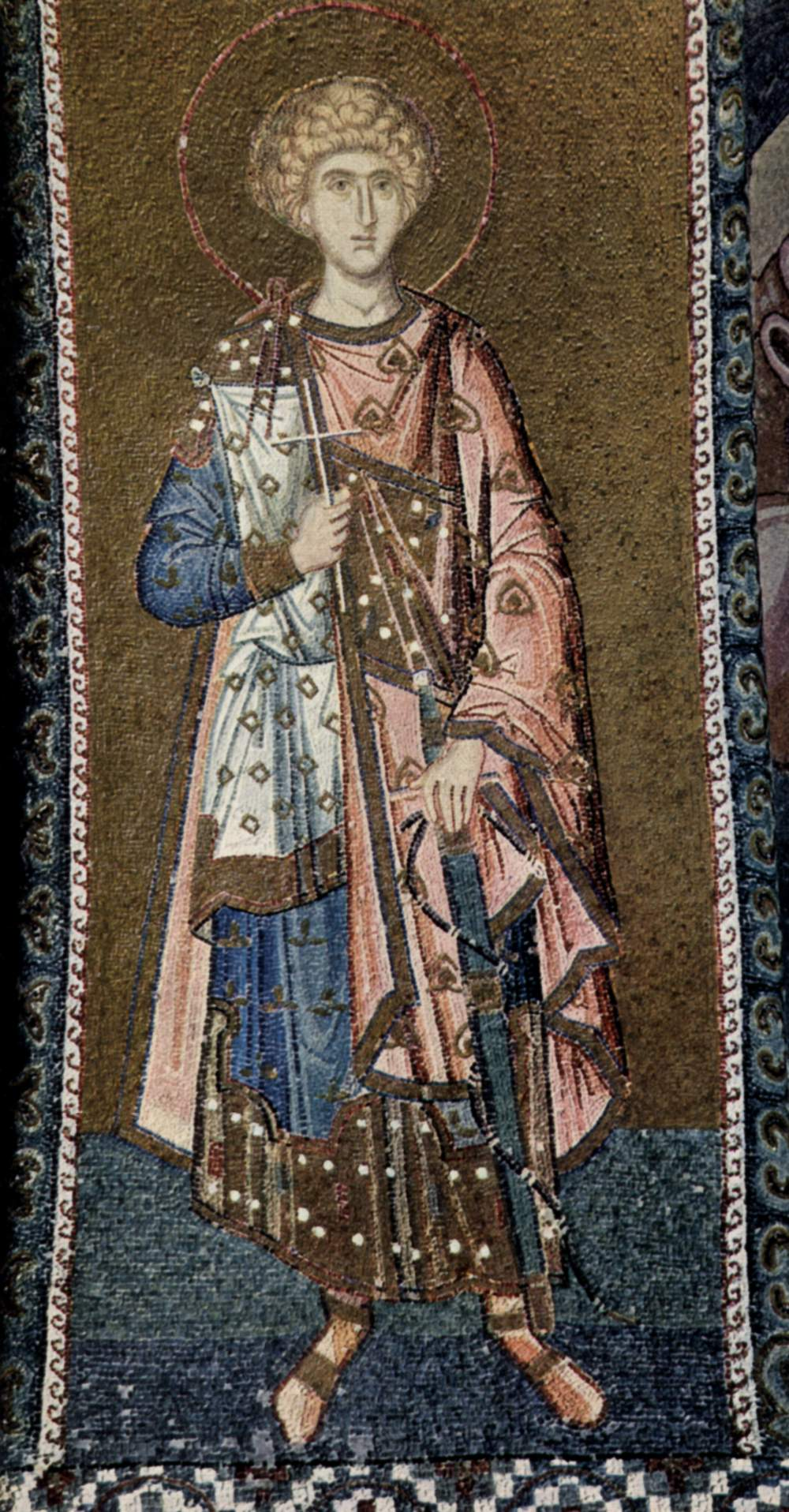
14th-century military martyr wears four layers, all patterned and richly trimmed: a tunic and a mantle decorated with a tablion

Greek dress is the clothing of the Greek people and citizens of Greece from antiquity to modern times.

== Ancient period ==
Clothing in ancient Greece primarily consisted of the chiton, peplos, himation, and chlamys. While no clothes have survived from this period, descriptions exist in contemporary accounts and artistic depictions. Clothes were mainly homemade, and often served many purposes (such as bedding). Despite popular imagination and media depictions of all-white clothing, elaborate design and bright colors were favored.

Ancient Greek clothing consisted of lengths of linen or wool fabric, which generally was rectangular. Clothes were secured with ornamental clasps or pins (περόνη, perónē; cf. fibula), and a belt, sash, or girdle (zone) might secure the waist.

Men's robes went down to their knees, whereas women's went down to their ankles.

== Byzantine period ==
The Byzantine dress changed considerably over the thousand years of the Empire, but was essentially conservative. The Byzantines liked colour and pattern, and made and exported very richly patterned cloth, especially Byzantine silk, woven and embroidered for the upper classes, and resist-dyed and printed for the lower. A different border or trimming round the edges was very common, and many single stripes down the body or around the upper arm are seen, often denoting class or rank. Taste for the middle and upper classes followed the latest fashions at the Imperial Court.

As for the colour, purple and tyrian purple (porphyra) was reserved for the imperial dynasties; other colours in various contexts conveyed information as to class and clerical or government rank. Lower-class people wore simple tunics but still had the preference for bright colours found in all Byzantine fashions. The Byzantine love for colour had its sinister side. The races in the Hippodrome used four teams: red, white, blue and green; and the supporters of these became Political factions, taking sides on the great theological issues.

== Ottoman period ==
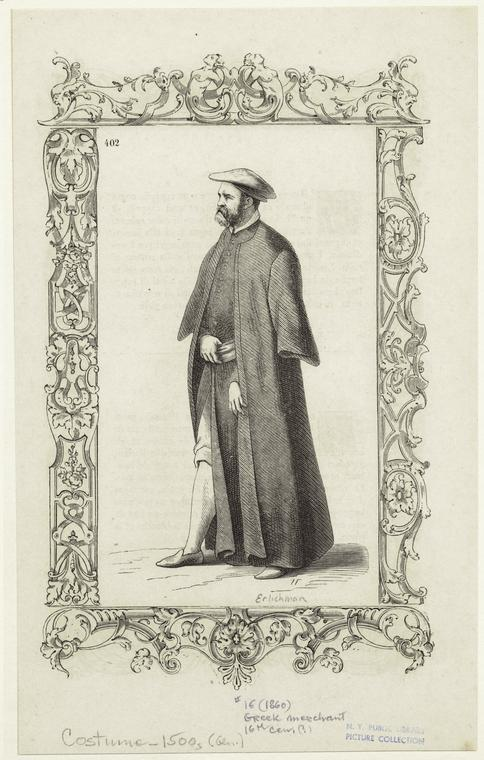
Greek merchant (16th century) by Cesare Vecellio

Inside the Ottoman Empire, Greeks were part of the Rum Millet. The administrators occasionally brought about legal regulations on clothes (see sumptuary laws). The clothing of Muslims, Christians, Jewish communities, clergy, tradesmen state and military officials were strictly regulated during the reign of Suleiman the Magnificent. Political crises of the 17th century were reflected as chaos in clothes.

During the period, each area had its own different clothing style. The islanders, from the westernmost Ionian Islands to the easternmost Cyprus, used to wear the Vraka, a type of traditional breeches.

At the rural areas, a popular clothing was the fustanella, a traditional skirt-like garment. Fustanella was worn also by the klephts and the armatoloi. and predominantly by the Arvanites of Greece as described by foreign travelers.

Apart from them, the wealthy Greeks of the urban centres adopted the Western European-style dress.

== Modern period ==
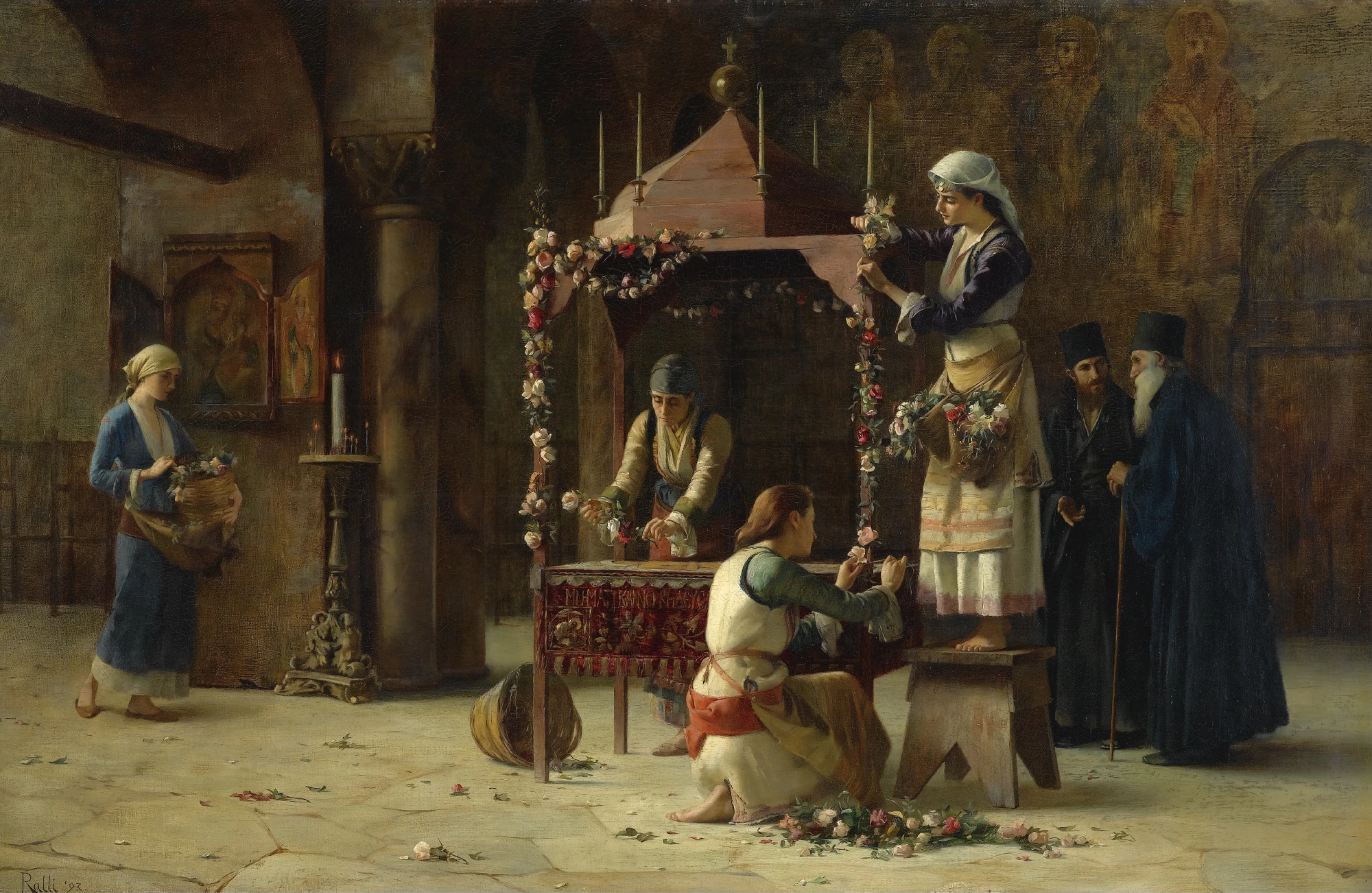
Holy Friday, Greece by Théodore Jacques Ralli c. 1893, Greek women wearing traditional Greek clothing.

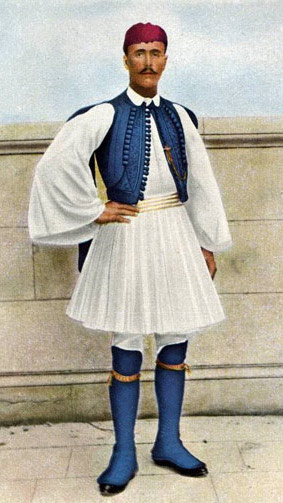
Spyros Louis wearing a fustanella

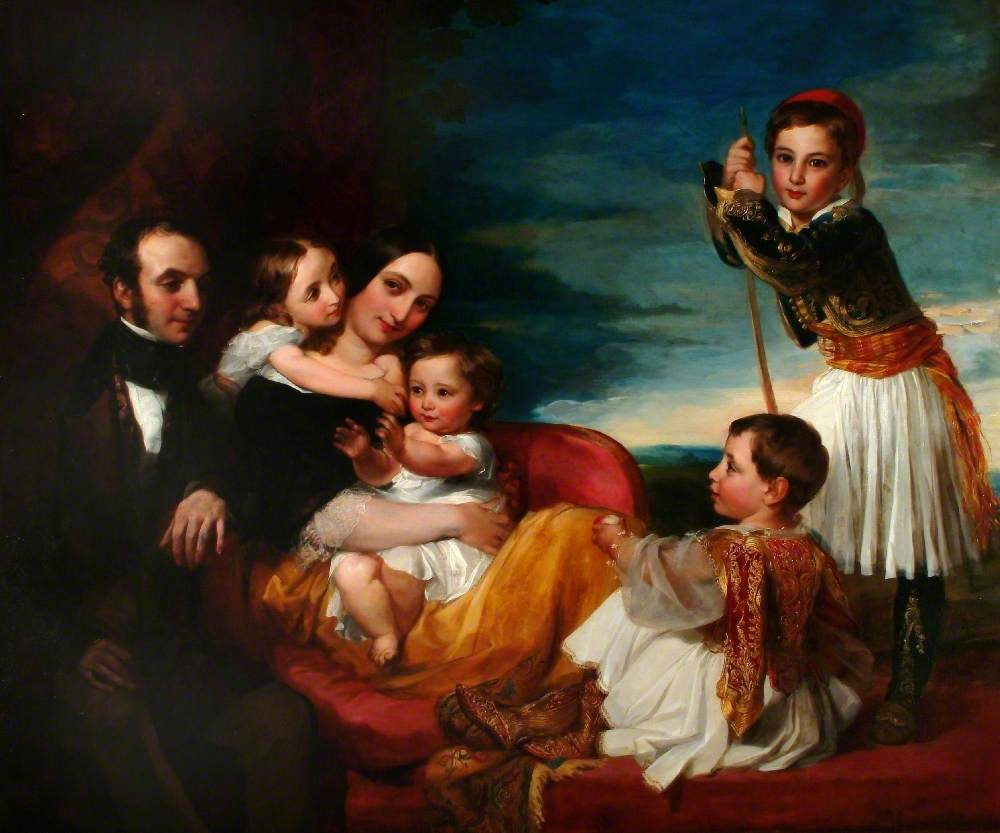
The Ionides Family by George Frederic Watts, 1840

In the independent Greece, Otto and Amalia were the first to be interested in fashion matters. Amalia created a romantic folksy court dress, which became a national Greek costume still known as the Amalía dress. It follows the Biedermeier style, with a loose-fitting, white cotton or silk shirt, often decorated with lace at the neck and handcuffs, over which a richly embroidered jacket or vest is worn, usually of dark blue or claret velvet. The skirt was ankle-length, unpressed-pleated silk, the color usually azure. It was completed with a soft cap or fez with a single, long, golden silk tassel, traditionally worn by married women, or with the kalpaki (a toque) of the unmarried woman, and sometimes with a black veil for church. This dress became the usual attire of all Christian townswomen in both Ottoman Empire-occupied and liberated Balkan lands as far north as Belgrade. Nineteenth-century Greek painter Théodore Jacques Ralli created countless paintings featuring subjects wearing traditional Greek attire between 1873 and 1909. The woman typically wore the Greek mandili headscarf.

Otto adopted the fustanella for his personal guard, still in use by the Evzones, members of the Presidential Guard.

Since then, the Greek fashion follows the European standards. However completely black clothing is worn for one year in mourning.

A cliché depicts also the mountainous Cretans wearing black trousers, shirts, black stivania (Cretan type of boot), black sariki (Cretan type of woven headscarf), and gold neck chain.
