= The Ionides Family =

Painting by George Frederic Watts

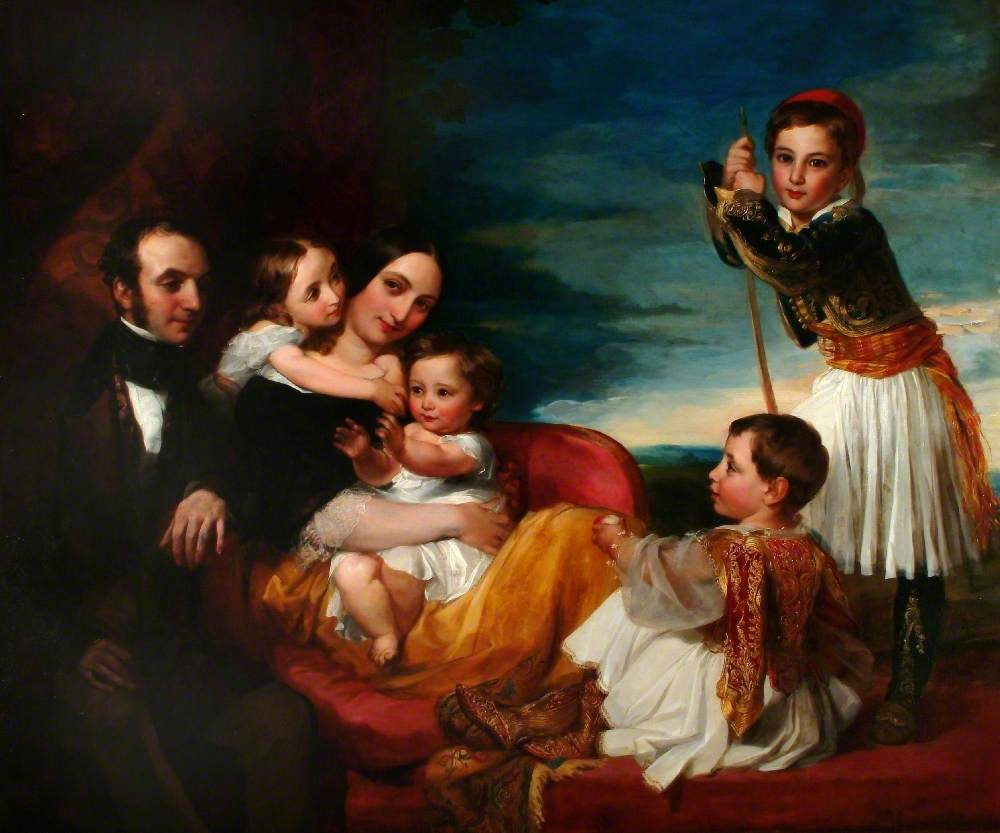
- Artist: George Frederic Watts
- Year: 1840
- Type: Oil on canvas, portrait painting
- Dimensions: 150 cm × 183 cm (59 in × 72 in)
- Location: Watts Gallery; Surrey

The Ionides Family is an 1840 oil painting by the British artist George Frederic Watts. A group portrait, it depicts the Greek businessman Alexander Constantine Ionides with his wife Euterpe and their eldest four children including Aglaia Coronio. The two eldest boys are shown in Greek national costume. It has been described as the most ambitious portrait of Watts' early career. It was commissioned to commemorate Alexander becoming a British subject and was produced at the family's house in Tulse Hill in South London, where it hung. Watts was a frequent visitor to their home and also produced many individual portraits of members of the family.

Today the original painting is in the Watts Gallery in Surrey, which acquired it from Sotheby's in 2005.A second, smaller version is in the collection of the Victoria and Albert Museum which presented by Constantine - the youngest child in the picture - who became a major benefactor.

== Bibliography ==
- Bills, Mark & Bryant, Barbara. G.F. Watts: Victorian Visionary : Highlights from the Watts Gallery Collection. Yale University Press, 2008.
- Dakers, Caroline. The Holland Park Circle: Artists and Victorian Society. Yale University Press, 1999.
