= Alexander Constantine Ionides =

19th century, Constantinople-born, British art patron

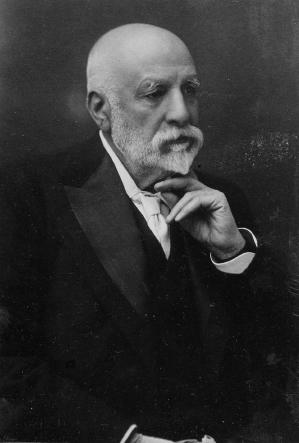
- A photograph of Alexander Constantine Ionides
- Born: 20 August 1810; Constantinople, Ottoman Empire
- Died: 10 November 1890 (aged 80); Hastings, Sussex, England
- Spouse: Euterpe (Lucas) Sgouta

Alexander Constantine Ionides (Greek: Κωνσταντίνος Ιωνίδης), also known as Konstantinos Ioannou or Iplixis (Κωνσταντίνος Ιωάννου/Ιπλιξής; 1 September 1810 – 10 November 1890) was a Greek-British art patron and collector.

== Life ==
Alexander Constantine Iplixes was born in Constantinople on 1 September 1810. His parents were Constantine Ioannes "Iplik(t)zis" Ioannou/Ionides (1775–1852) and his wife Mariora Ioannou-Sentoukakis (1784–1857). His father set up a London branch for his trading firm in c. 1815. In 1827 Alexander came to London, finishing his education at Brixton.

He married Euterpe Sgouta (1816–1892) in Constantinople, before settling in Cheetham Hill, Manchester. They would have five children.

He then founded his own textile and wheat trading-firm, Ionides and Company (he changed his surname from Ipliktzis to Ionides at this time), operating between London and the Near East and the Balkans.

He soon began to patronise the arts around 1829, both in Britain (where his protégés included Edward Calvert and George Frederic Watts, who became his friends) and in Greece (where he followed his father as a patron of the University of Athens).

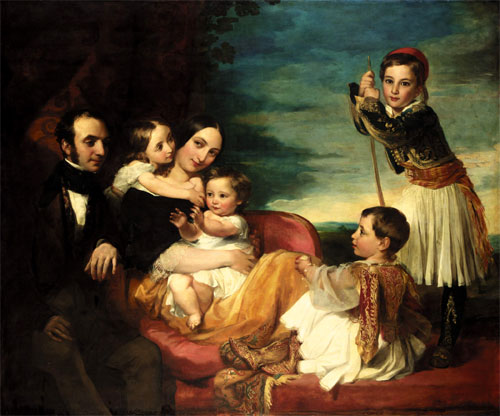
The Ionides Family by George Frederic Watts, 1840 (Watts Gallery)

In 1834 Ionides and his family moved to London, where they lived at 9 Finsbury Circus from 1834 to 1839). In 1837 he became a naturalised British citizen. Afterwards they moved to Tulse Hill (1838–1864) and finally to 1 Holland Park (1864 onwards), during which time began to gather an artistic salon at his home. Acting as Greek consul-general in 1854–1866, he held directorships of the Crystal Palace (1855) and of many banks. His son Alexander introduced him in 1860 to artists whom he had met in Paris, such as James Abbott McNeill Whistler, Edward Poynter, Thomas Armstrong, and George du Maurier; later Dante Gabriel Rossetti and Edward Burne-Jones also joined Ionides's circle. He commissioned the designers Philip Webb and Thomas Jeckyll to redecorate 1 Holland Park. In 1875, he finally moved to a house called "Windycroft" in Hastings, leaving Alexander to complete the Aesthetic redecoration at 1 Holland Park by commissioning William Morris and Walter Crane).

== Children ==
- Constantine Alexander Ionides (1833–1900), patron and collector
- Aglaia Coronio (1834–1906), patron, collector, confidante of Morris and a friend of Rossetti
- Luke Ionides (1837–1924), friend of Whistler, patron and collector, whose fourth son Basil became an architect
- Alexander (Aleco; 1840–1898), who joined with his father in collecting Tanagra figurines and Greek vases
- Chariclea Anthea Euterpe Dannreuther (1844–1923), married the musician Edward Dannreuther

== In popular culture ==
- Ionides is one of the inspirations for the character Sir Lewis Cornelys in the 1894 George du Maurier novel Trilby.
