= Constantine Alexander Ionides =

British art patron and collector

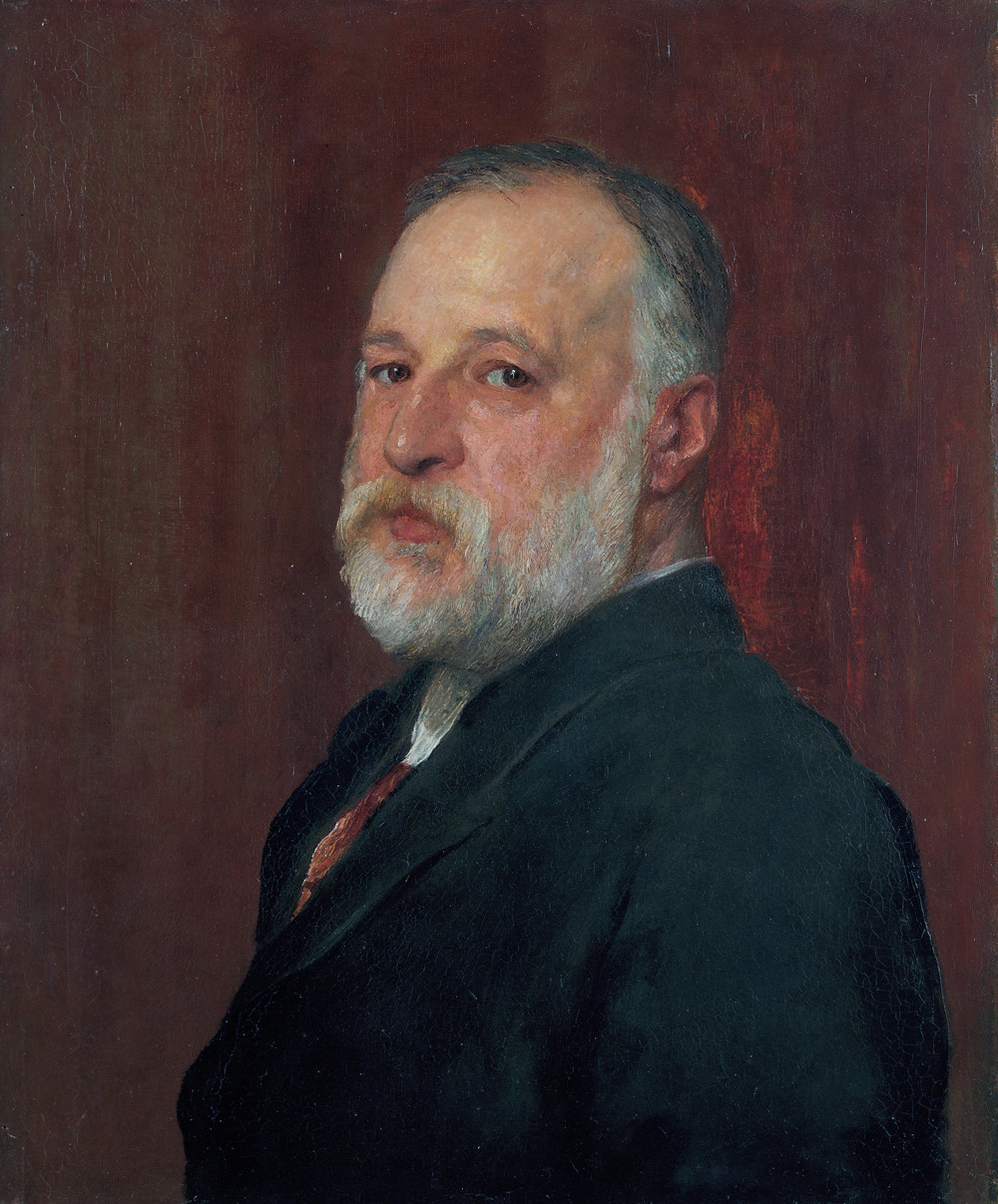
- Constantine Alexandre Ionides by George Frederic Watts, 1880
- Born: 14 May 1833
- Died: 20 June 1900 (aged 67)
- Occupation: Art collector, collector

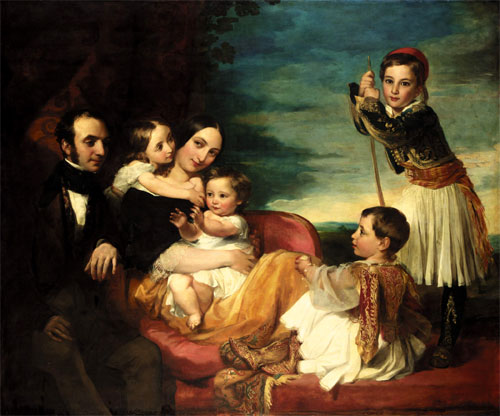
The Ionides Family, by George Frederic Watts, 1840 (Watts Gallery) - Constantine Alexander is the first child on the left, with his arms round his mother's neck.

Constantine Alexander Ionides (14 May 1833 in Manchester – 29 June 1900 in Brighton, Greek: Κωνσταντίνος Αλέξανδρος Ιωνίδης) was a British art patron and collector, of Greek ancestry.

He was born in Britain on 14 May 1833 in Manchester, the son of the collector and businessman Alexander Constantine Ionides, who had come to Britain from Constantinople in 1827. His younger siblings were Aglaia Coronio (b. 1834), Luca (b. 1837), Alexandro (b. 1840) and Chariclea (b. 1844). He is best known for his bequest of 82 oil paintings to the Victoria and Albert Museum. He is buried in Hove.
