= The Beloved (Rossetti) =

1865 painting by Dante Gabriel Rossetti

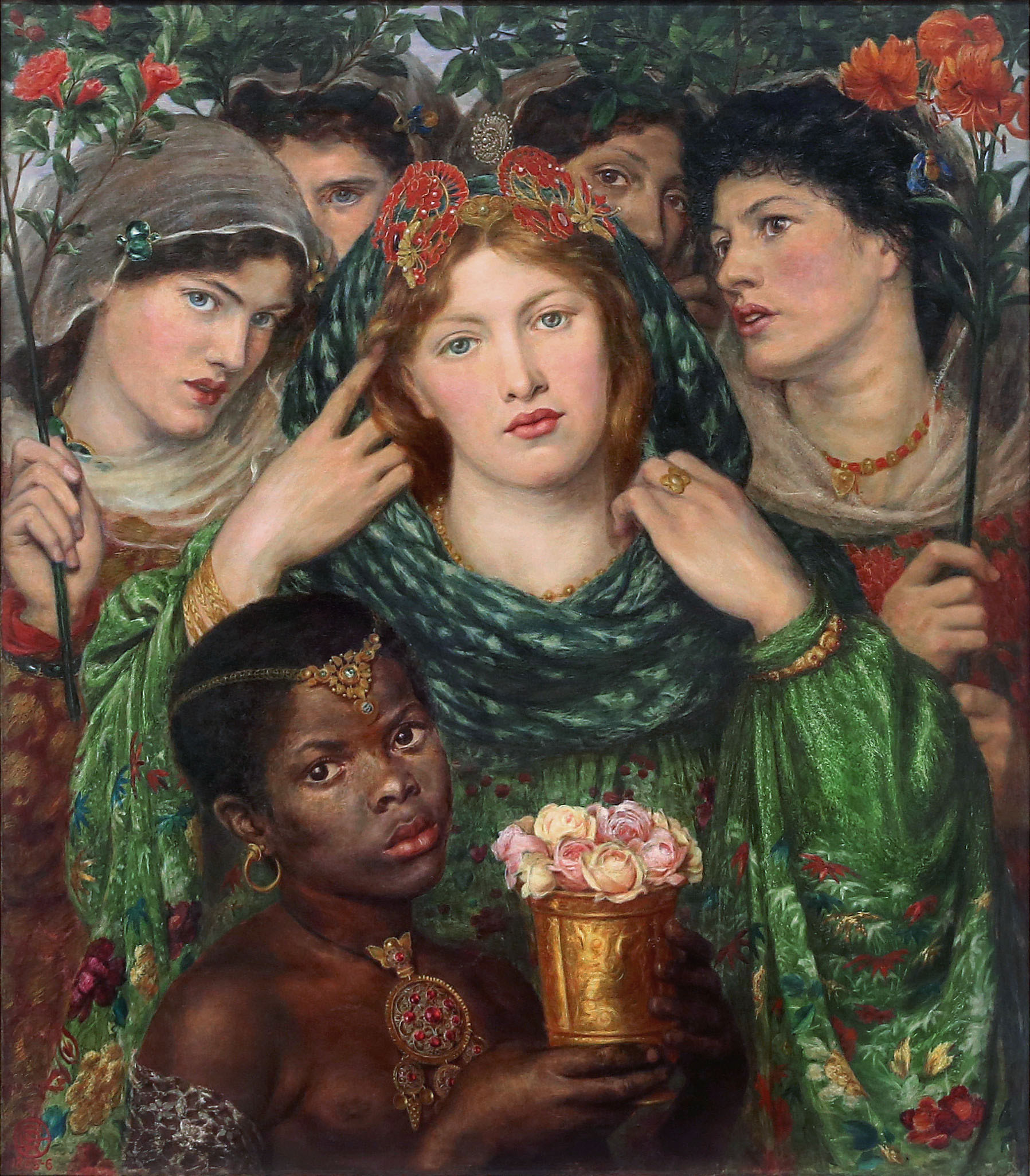
- Artist: Dante Gabriel Rossetti
- Year: 1865–1866
- Medium: Oil on canvas
- Dimensions: 80 cm × 76 cm (31 in × 30 in)
- Location: Tate Britain, London

The Beloved (also The Bride) is an oil painting on canvas by the English artist Dante Gabriel Rossetti (1828–1882), now in Tate Britain, London. Rossetti signed his initials (as a monogram) and the date as "1865-6" on the bottom left of the canvas. It depicts the bride, or "beloved", from the Song of Solomon in the Hebrew Bible as she approaches her bridegroom, with her attendants.

The bride, caught in the action of moving back her veil, is attended by four virginal bridesmaids and an African page, who contrasts strikingly with the red hair and pale skin of the bride, and the varying shades of brunette hair and skin tones of the four bridesmaids. It has been suggested that this colour contrast, carefully painted as a frame to the bride's features, was influenced by Édouard Manet's controversial painting Olympia, in progress when Rossetti visited Manet's studio in late 1864 while working on The Beloved, and the painting also owes much to the works of Titian.

In many respects, the painting fits into the series of "bust-length oil paintings of beautiful women" which were Rossetti's main painted output from 1859 to about 1867. These were a conscious change of style, to explore painterly effects of (in his words) "flesh painting" and colour, abandoning the densely packed narrative scenes, in media other than oil painting, he had produced over most of the 1850s, when he followed more closely the ideals of the Pre-Raphaelite Brotherhood. These grew "larger and more luxurious" in the next decade, and included Bocca Baciata, Venus Verticordia, Beata Beatrix, The Blue Bower, Monna Vanna, Regina Cordium, and Lady Lilith. But these were all rather tightly framed pictures of a single figure, "in confined layers of space", with varying props and background, reflecting a variety of historical periods.

It is generally agreed that Rossetti set out to show a range of skin colours within the figures, but the identification and interpretation of these varies greatly.

== History ==
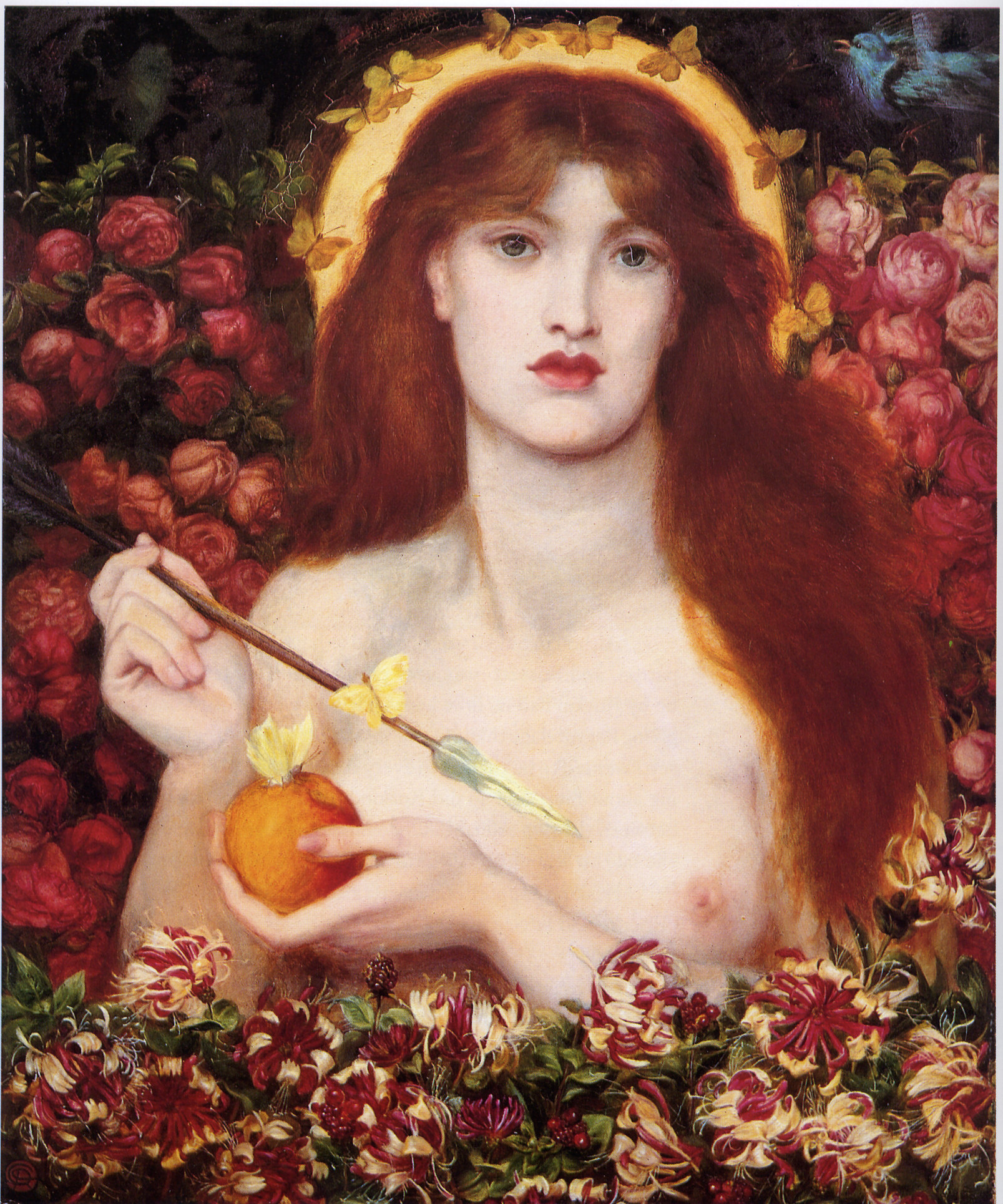
Venus Verticordia, on which Rossetti was working at the same time; Alexa Wilding was the model

The painting was commissioned in 1863 by Rossetti's regular patron, the Birkenhead banker George Rae, for £300. At that stage, the broad composition seems to have been the same as in the final work, but the subject was intended to be Dante's Beatrice, as imagined in the poet's Il Purgatorio. After a month or two's work in the summer of 1863, the subject was changed to illustrate the Song of Solomon from the Bible, apparently because Rossetti found the complexion of his chosen model for the main figure at that point, Marie Ford, "too bright for his conception of Dante's Beatrice".

Work progressed rather slowly, perhaps as Rossetti was working on other paintings at the same time, including Venus Verticordia, begun in 1864, but not finished until 1868. On a visit to Paris in November 1864, he paid a call to the studio of Édouard Manet, where he may well have seen Manet's Olympia, then a work in progress, where a white female nude contrasts with a clothed black maid. Manet did not paint the maid until the following month, but she may have been sketched in, or discussed with Rossetti.

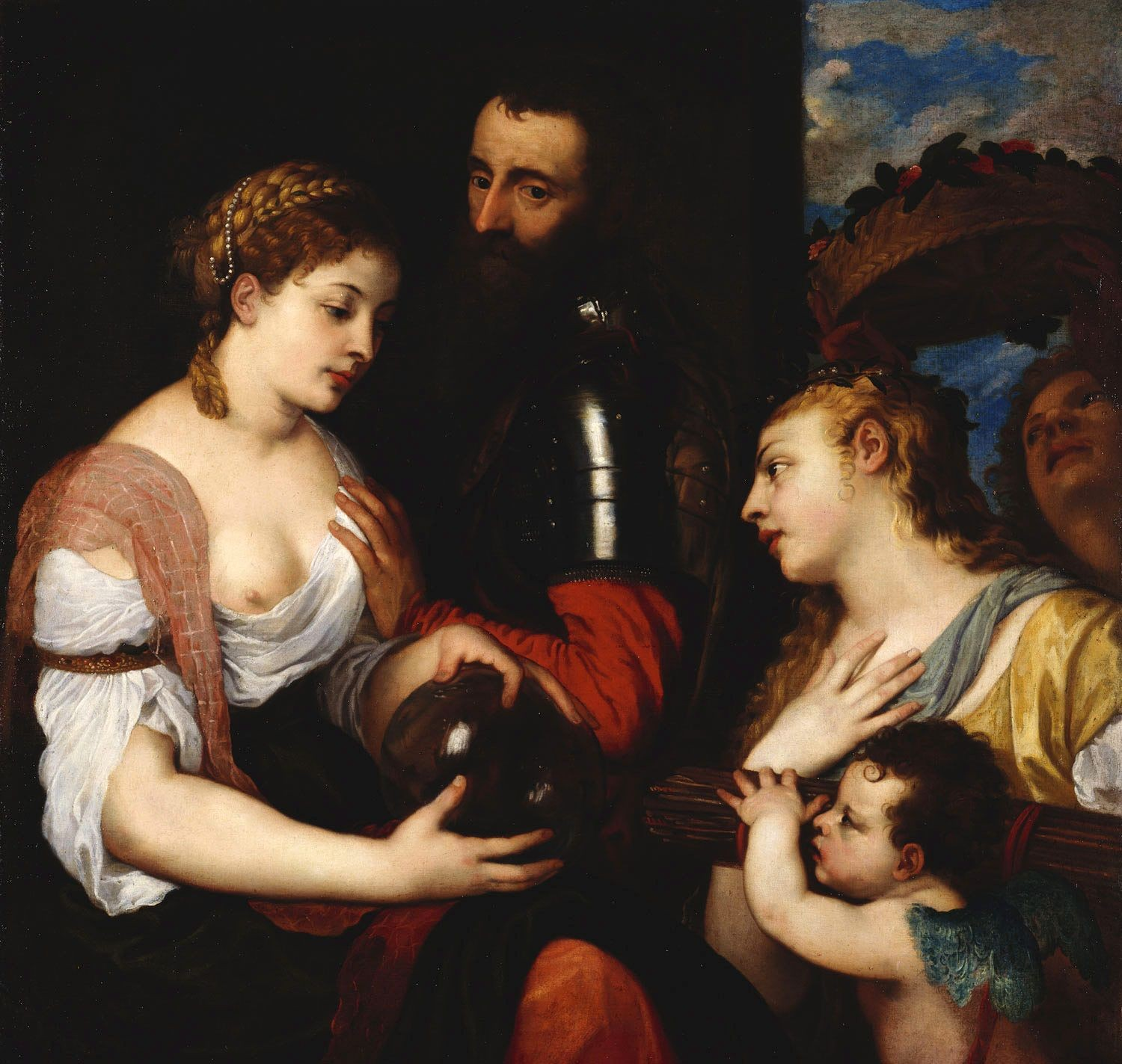
Copy of Titian's Allegory of Marriage (the so-called Allegory of Alfonso d'Avalos), Royal Collection

It has also been suggested that the general composition was influenced by Titian's Allegory of Marriage (formerly so-called Allegory of Alfonso d'Avalos) in the Louvre, with three 17th-century copies (one a watercolour) in the Royal Collection. This is an allegory of marriage, with a number of figures arranged around a central object.

In March 1865 Rossetti painted a "Japanese" dress over the main figure, and replaced the previous female black ("mulatto" according to art historians) child with a male one, preferring his darker skin tone . By the autumn it was sufficiently complete to be shown to the leading art critic F.G. Stephens, who described it in some detail in the 21 October 1865 issue of the Athenaeum magazine, of which he was the editor for art, noting that: "As she unveils, they [the attendants] look with different expressions for the effect of the disclosure on the coming man". Stephens and Rossetti were close, and Rossetti would have seen the critique before publication. It appears Stephens sometimes allowed Rossetti to write such things himself, under Stephens's name.

Stephens praised Rossetti for his use of colour. However, he pointed out some technical errors. For example, Stephens claimed that the African page’s hands look unnatural considering the vase that he is holding. Furthermore, Stephens pointed out that the child's necklace does not seem to lie flat on his chest. Rather, the ornament is positioned in a way that the viewers of the piece could see its patterns and details.

Rossetti did further work over the winter, hence his date of "1865-6" on the canvas. The painting was first exhibited, for a single day, at the Arundel Club on 21 February 1866. Rossetti took the painting back in 1873, when it was "considerably altered", changing the tone and making "more ideal" the heads of the bride and the woman to the right of her, and the bride's hands. A photograph of the painting before these changes exists.

In the 1911 Encyclopædia Britannica, whose art entries were supervised by Rossetti's brother, William Michael Rossetti, Rossetti's biography was by F.G. Stephens and another close friend, Theodore Watts-Dunton. In the biography the painting is praised highly:

The same elements, energy, a sympathetic and poetic scheme of colour, and composition of a fine order, combined with far greater force and originality in "The Bride", or "The Beloved", that magnificent illustration of The Song of Solomon. The last named is a life-size group of powerfully coloured and diversely beautiful damsels accompanying their mistress with music and with song on her way to the bridegroom. This picture, as regards its brilliance, finish, the charms of four lovely faces and the splendour of its lighting, occupies a great place 'in the highest grade of modern art of all the world. It is likewise, so far as the qualities named are concerned, the crowning piece of Rossetti's art, and stands for him much as the “ Sacred and Profane Love ” of Titian represents that master.

The painting was exhibited at the Royal Academy of Art in 1883 and 1906 (but then not until 1973), and in large loan exhibitions in Liverpool in 1886 and Manchester in 1887. The painting was bought by the Tate in 1916, "Purchased with assistance from Sir Arthur Du Cros Bt and Sir Otto Beit KCMG through the Art Fund". They had been the joint owners of this and Monna Vanna, which came at the same time.

=== Frame and inscription ===
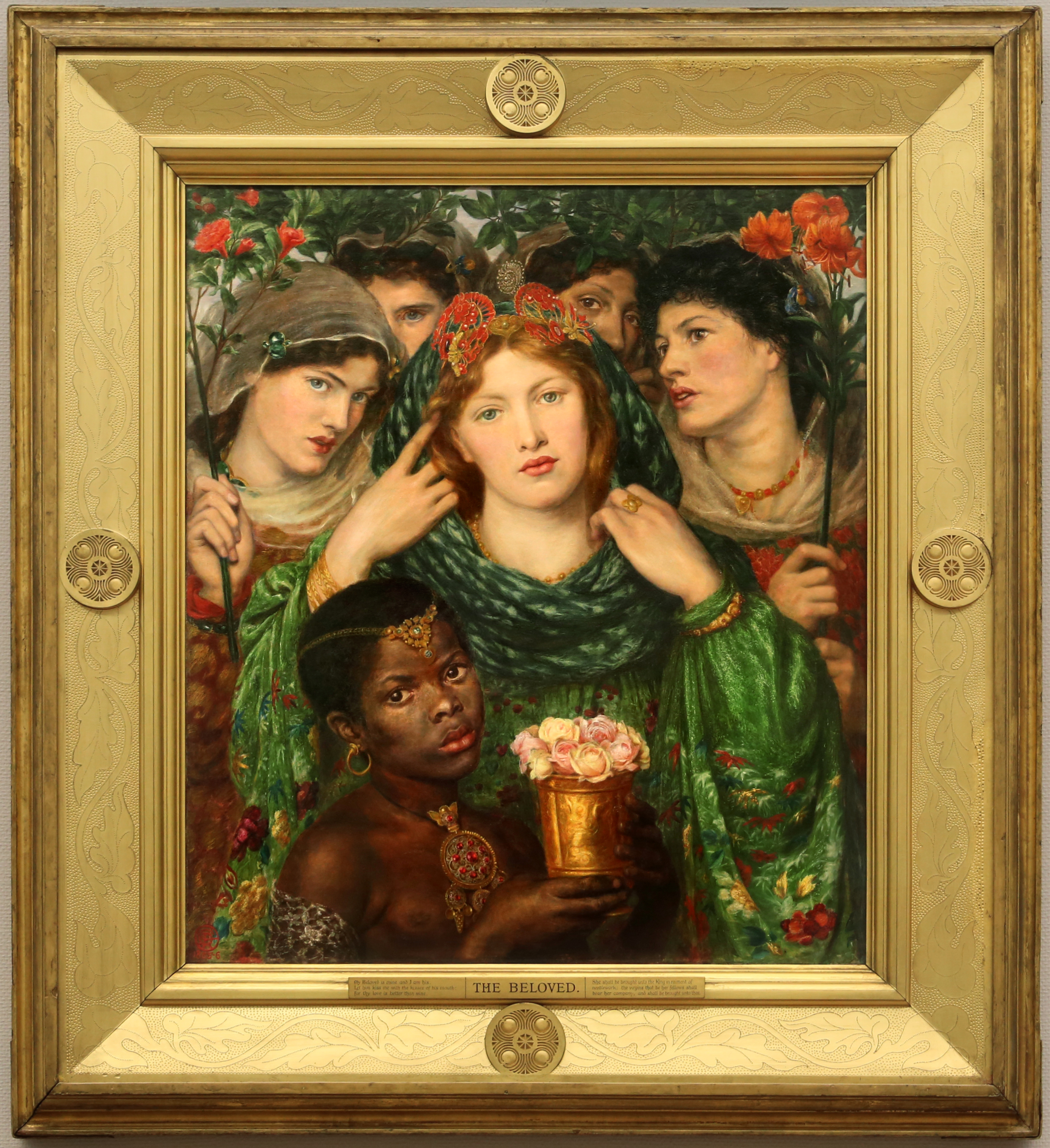
The painting in its frame, which was probably fitted in 1873.

The 1873 return to Rossetti's studio was probably when the frame was fitted; Rossetti often designed his own frames and inscriptions on them.

Between conventional small mouldings, the widest zone of the gilded wood frame has a vegetal scroll of "wavy fronds" on a dotted background, with four raised roundels with a geometrical design, each midway along a side. A small wooden plaque is in the centre of the bottom member, with painted inscriptions: "The Beloved" large in the centre, and two sets of verses from the Bible on the sides, run together and slightly edited. On the left the verses are from the Song of Solomon, and on the right from Psalm 45:

My beloved is mine and I am his (Song, 2:16)
Let him kiss me with the kisses of his mouth (Song 1:2)
for thy love is better than wine (Song 1:2)
She shall be brought unto the King in raiment of
needlework: the virgins that be her fellows shall
bear her company, and shall be brought unto thee (Psalm 45:14)

== Ideals of beauty ==
While the painting is mainly regarded as a celebration of feminine beauty in general, it has been interpreted as a celebration of a specific type of beauty. Most art historians assert that all the women are intended to be beautiful, "diversely beautiful damsels" with "the charms of four lovely faces" as the 1911 Encyclopædia Britannica put it.

However, recently some art historians have suggested that the painting's positioning of the models depicts the central woman as more beautiful. She has an oval and symmetrical face with blue-green eyes and Cupid's bow lips. Her paler skin may accentuate her beauty compared to the others. It is suggested these characteristics mean that this piece upholds whiteness as a standard of beauty. But another recent art historian claims (because of her red hair) that the bride is presented as an "Irish exotic Other", also claiming that Rossetti "demonstrated a fetishistic fixation on skin color and race", and that her position as a bride "can be seen as a representation of anxiety of the increasing presence of [Irish] foreign immigrants in Great Britain." But the model Alexa Wilding had red hair, which Rossetti liked to paint throughout his career. In his first two major paintings The Girlhood of Mary Virgin (1848) and Ecce Ancilla Domini! (1850), he had used his sister Christina Rossetti as his model for the Virgin Mary, and painted her with red hair, which was not her actual hair colour, nor indeed at all usual for depictions of Mary.

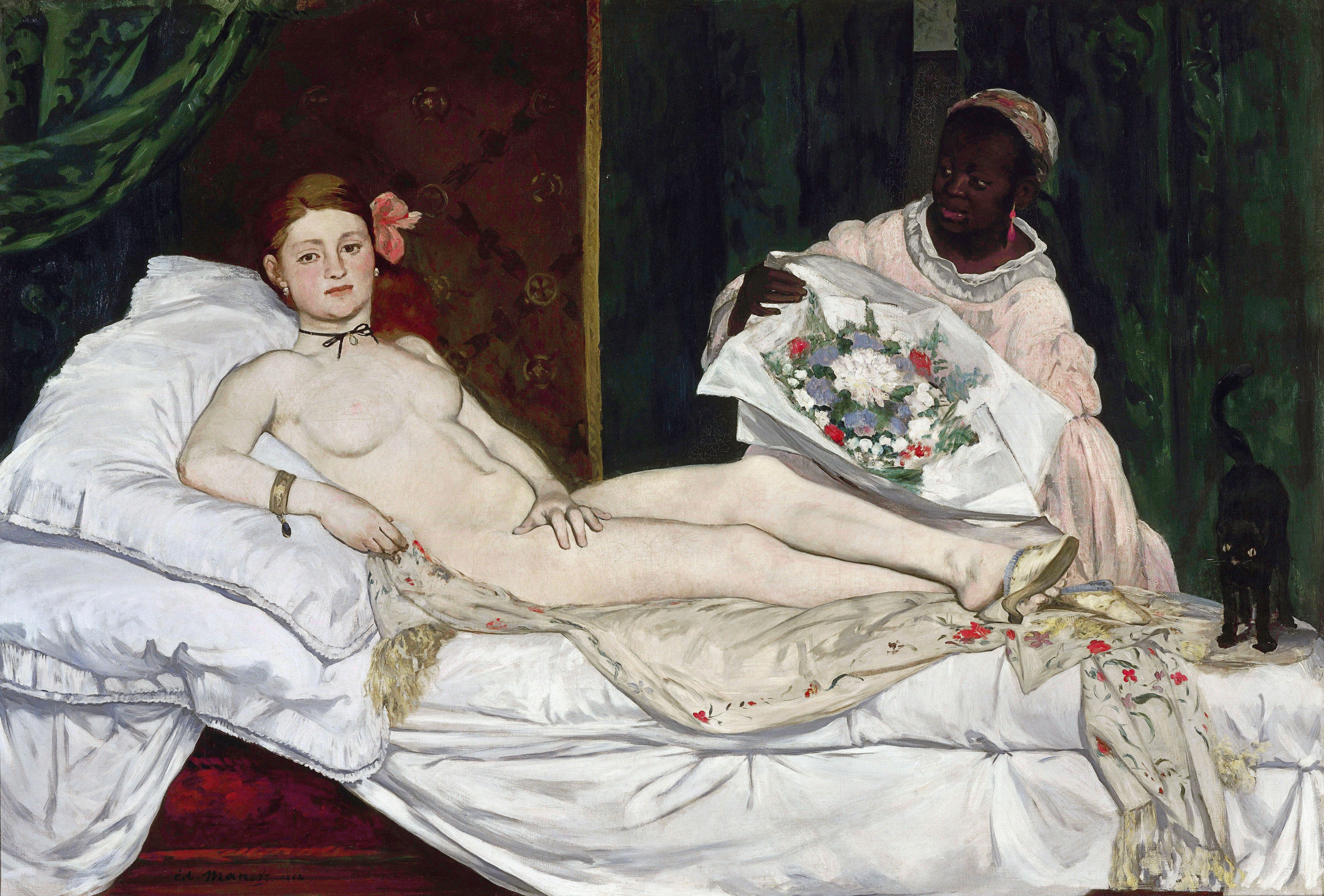
Édouard Manet, Olympia. The maid was not painted until the month after Rossetti's visit in November 1864.

A variety of interpretations of the standard of beauty and the African page has caused debates about Rossetti and this painting's relationship to racism. With the central figure being a white female, some art historians claim that this piece idealizes whiteness. On the other hand, others argue that the piece celebrates racial diversity. The hair ornament of the bride is based on Chinese featherwork. The green robe that she is wearing is a Japanese kimono (though held tight at the wrist by a bracelet in a most un-Japanese way). The pendant worn by the page is North African. For some scholars, these details indicate that Rossetti pays tribute to the variety of cultures across the globe.

== The African page ==
The African page is another element that makes this piece unusual in Rossetti's paintings of the period. Prior to the 1990s, not much notice was taken of the African page other than as a colour contrast for aesthetic effect. But since 2000 the page has become the primary focus of academic discussion. The curator and writer Jan Marsh, claimed that the page "owes his presence in The Beloved to [...] current Abolitionist campaigning" taking place in the United States during the Civil War. The art historian Matthew Francis Rarey has disputed the idea that Rossetti intended to make a political statement, arguing instead that the painter included the page specifically in an effort to transcend politics, attempting a "figuration of Blackness independent of political implication or moral value."

== The models ==
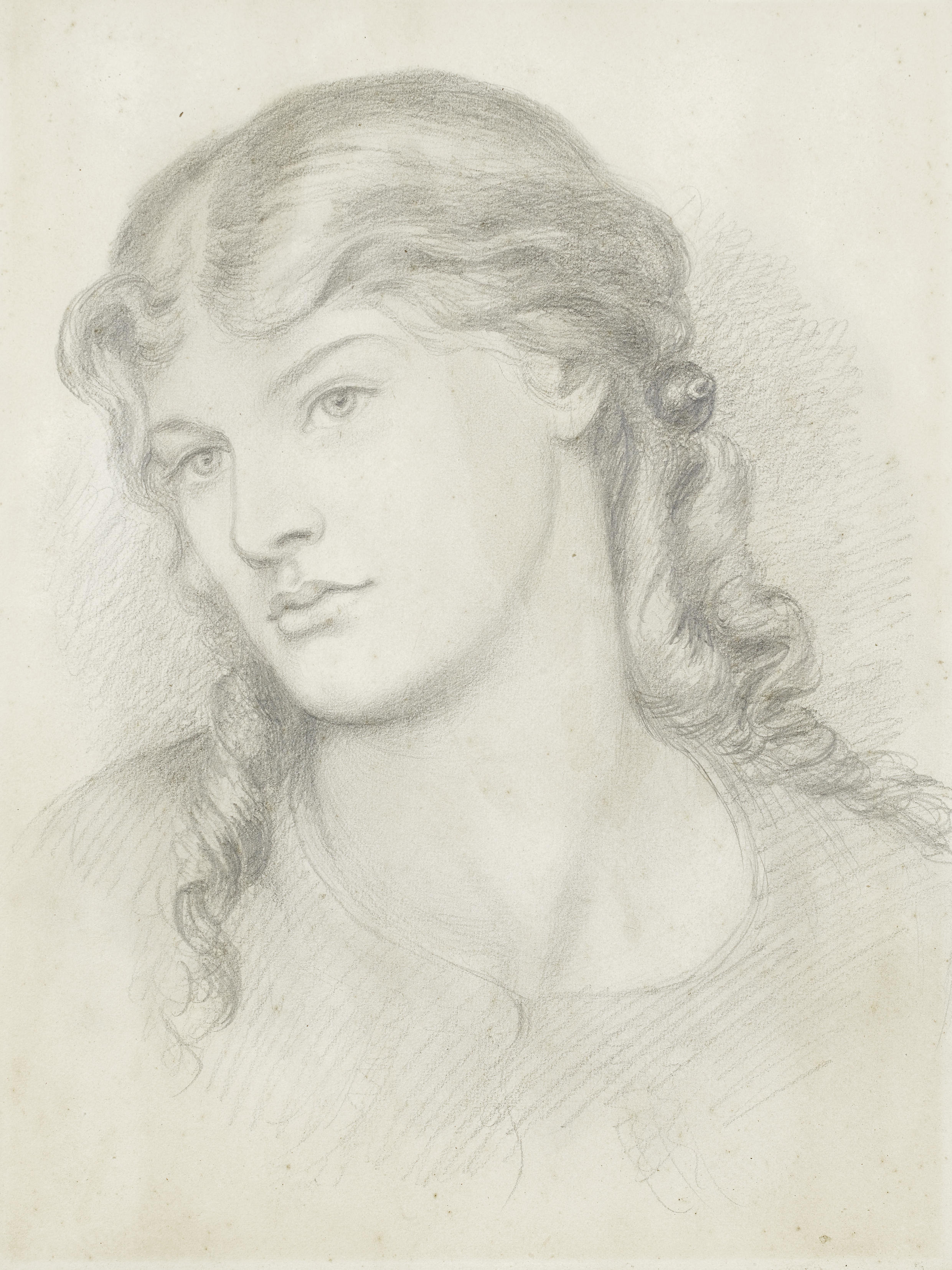
Rossetti drawing of Alexa Wilding, 1865

Rossetti mostly used a small group of models, and often changed the model during the development of a work, as he did with Venus Verticordia, and even repainted the face with a different one some years after initial completion, as with Lady Lilith slightly later. In both cases the final model was the redhead Alexa Wilding. There is some disagreement as to whose was the final face used for the central figure. He seems to have begun with Marie Ford, but may have changed to Alexa Wilding; the hair colour suggests this. Rossetti's brother said it was an (otherwise unknown) "Miss MacKenzie".

The known models for the six figures include:

- Alexa Wilding (front, the bride) - see above
- Ellen Smith (left)
- Marie Ford (back left)
- Fanny Eaton (1835–1924) (back right)
- Keomi Gray (1849–1914) (front right)

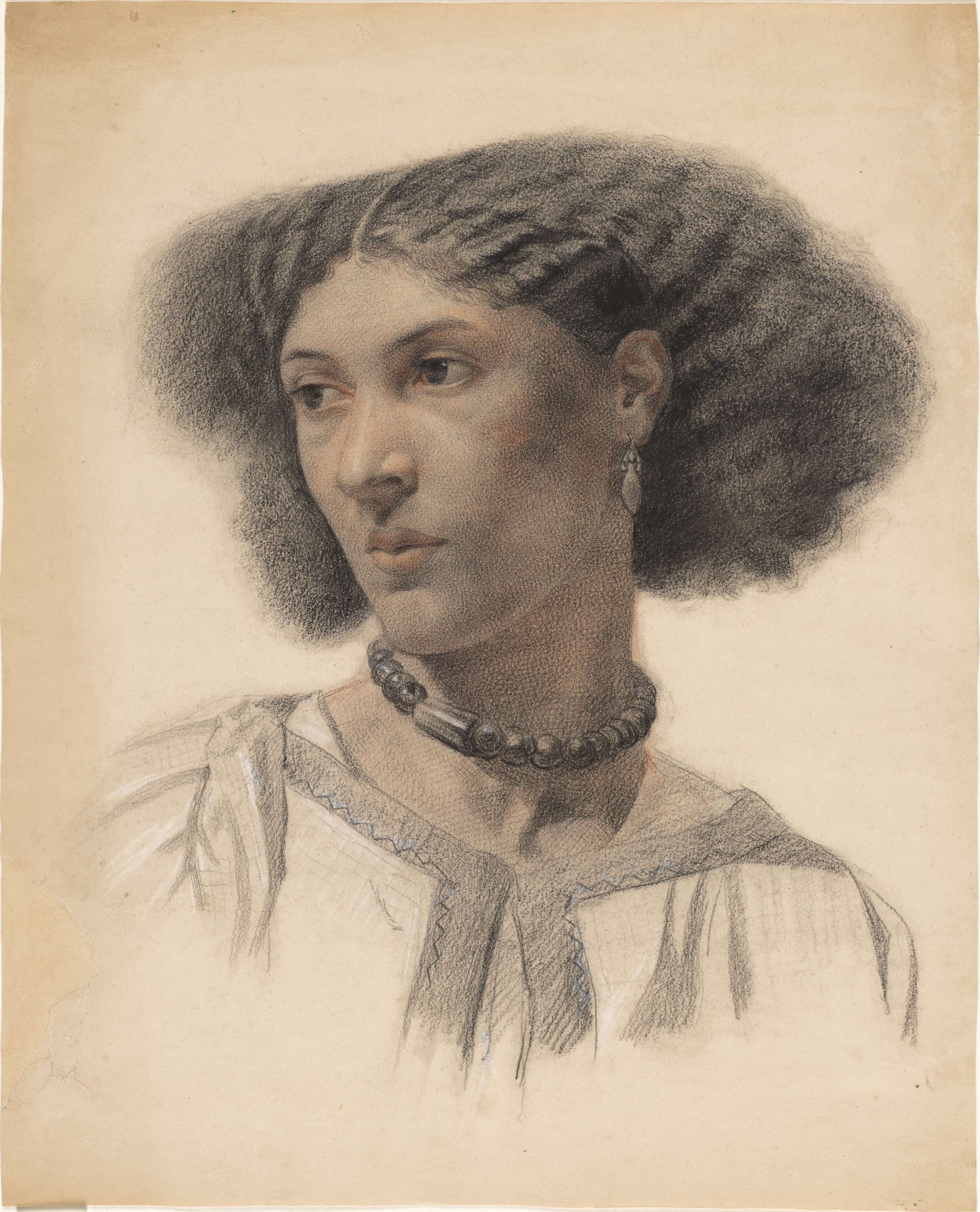
Mrs. Fanny Eaton, c. 1859, Walter Fryer Stocks

While the other models are looking directly at the viewer, that is to say the bridegroom, Gray is the only one who has her head turned away to the side. She was a Romani (gypsy). It has been claimed that she has her face turned away to symbolize the resistance from the stereotypes that Romani people faced during this time, and that it also shows Rossetti's uncertainties about the sexuality of gypsies and his broader interest in Romani culture.

Fanny Eaton was the model for the half-seen face at the back between the central bride and Keomi Gray at the right. She was born in Jamaica, probably to a recently emancipated slave mother, and a father who was a British soldier. She was used as a model by several artists, whose depictions of her striking features varied her skin tones to suit their subjects; she was painted as the mother of Moses, and as an African slave. She married a cab-driver in 1859, and when not modelling worked as a cook and cleaner.

Both male and female children were used as models for the initial studies of the child attendant. Gabriel is the name of one of the children who modelled for this figure.

== See also ==
- List of paintings by Dante Gabriel Rossetti
- Rossetti and His Circle, 1922 book by Max Beerbohm
