= Monna Rosa =

Painting by Dante Gabriel Rossetti

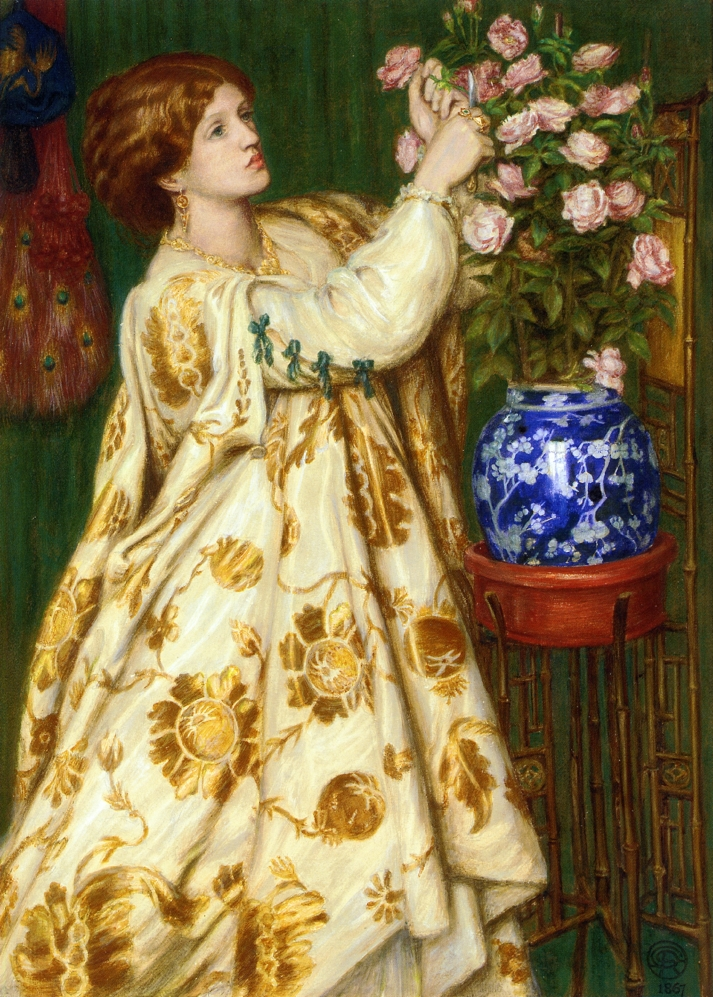
- Artist: Dante Gabriel Rossetti
- Year: 1867
- Medium: Oil on canvas
- Dimensions: 69 cm × 53 cm (27 in × 21 in)
- Location: private collection, Great Britain

Monna Rosa is the title of two oil paintings by Dante Gabriel Rossetti, both portraits of Frances Leyland, the wife of shipping magnate Frederick Richards Leyland, a regular patron of Rossetti. The earlier and smaller painting was completed in 1862 and its whereabouts is now unknown. The second was completed in 1867 and is now in a private collection.

Frederick Leyland displayed the larger painting in his drawing room with five other Rossetti "stunners."

== Painting ==
Rossetti wrote to Frederick Leyland about the painting on 18 June 1867:

Mrs Leyland's picture is much advanced and in every way much altered, as I have again had it considerably enlarged! To begin a fresco as a pocket miniature seems to be my rule in art. The picture is now 29 X 21 inches sight measure . . . . I have now given the figure a flowing white and gold drapery, which I think comes remarkably well and suits the head perfectly. I think I cannot do better than call the picture again Monna Rosa, and adopt a quotation from Poliziano, which fits it happily:

Con manto d'oro, collana ed anelli,

Le piace aver con quelli

Non altro che una rosa ai suoi capelli.

Thus the lady, richly dressed, is cutting a rose to put in her hair, & the treatment of the figure is accounted for.

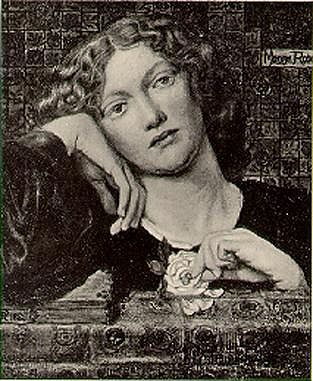
Early photograph of the 1862 painting.

Rossetti asked Leyland to return the painting for reworking and soon finished on 3 December 1873 at Kelmscott.

About the time Rossetti was painting Monna Rosa, he introduced James Abbott McNeill Whistler to Leyland. Monna Rosa's peacock background and blue and white Chinese porcelain are similar to the themes in The Peacock Room that Whistler later created for Leyland.

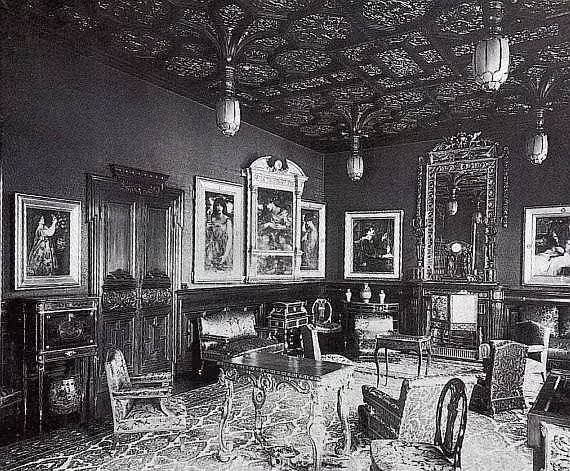
Six Rossetti paintings as hung in Leyland's drawing room, 1892. Monna Rosa hangs at the far left. (Click on any painting for its article.)

Henry Currie Marillie describe the painting in 1904 as a "small but pretty picture" and a "study in beautiful colour." Red and gold highlight the roses, Leyland's dress, jewellery, and hair, as well as the flower pot and peacock screen in the background. Linda Merrill is less dismissive, writing that the painting is

more a costume picture than a portrait, with studio props to enhance the theme of purposeless beauty: the conceit called for an extravagant scarf studded with peacock feathers and a blue and white pot in the artist's favorite "hawthorn" pattern.

In another modern view, Jessica Feldman stresses the blue and white Chinese pot "that has become the emblem of aestheticism itself." The pot should not be viewed as simply decorative, but reflects the textures of the dress, roses and screen. It recalls Rossetti's collector's passion for oriental ware and even his penchant for translation – in this case translating a Chinese pot to an English painting.

Monna Rosa was among the first of eighteen paintings Leyland commissioned from Rossetti, not counting unfulfilled commissions. Soon after acquiring the painting, they explored the idea of a Rossetti triptych, which was eventually formed with Mnemosyne, The Blessed Damozel, and Proserpine. Three additional Rossetti painting were then hung in Leyland's drawing room, all of which Leyland called "stunners."

== See also ==
- List of paintings by Dante Gabriel Rossetti

== Sources ==
- Wildman, Stephen; Laurel Bradley; Deborah Cherry; John Christian; David B. Elliott; Betty Elzea; Margaretta Fredrick; Caroline Hannah; Jan Marsh; Gayle Seymour (2004). Waking Dreams, the Art of the Pre-Raphaelites from the Delaware Art Museum. Art Services International. p. 395.
