= George Rae (banker) =

British businessman (1817–1902)

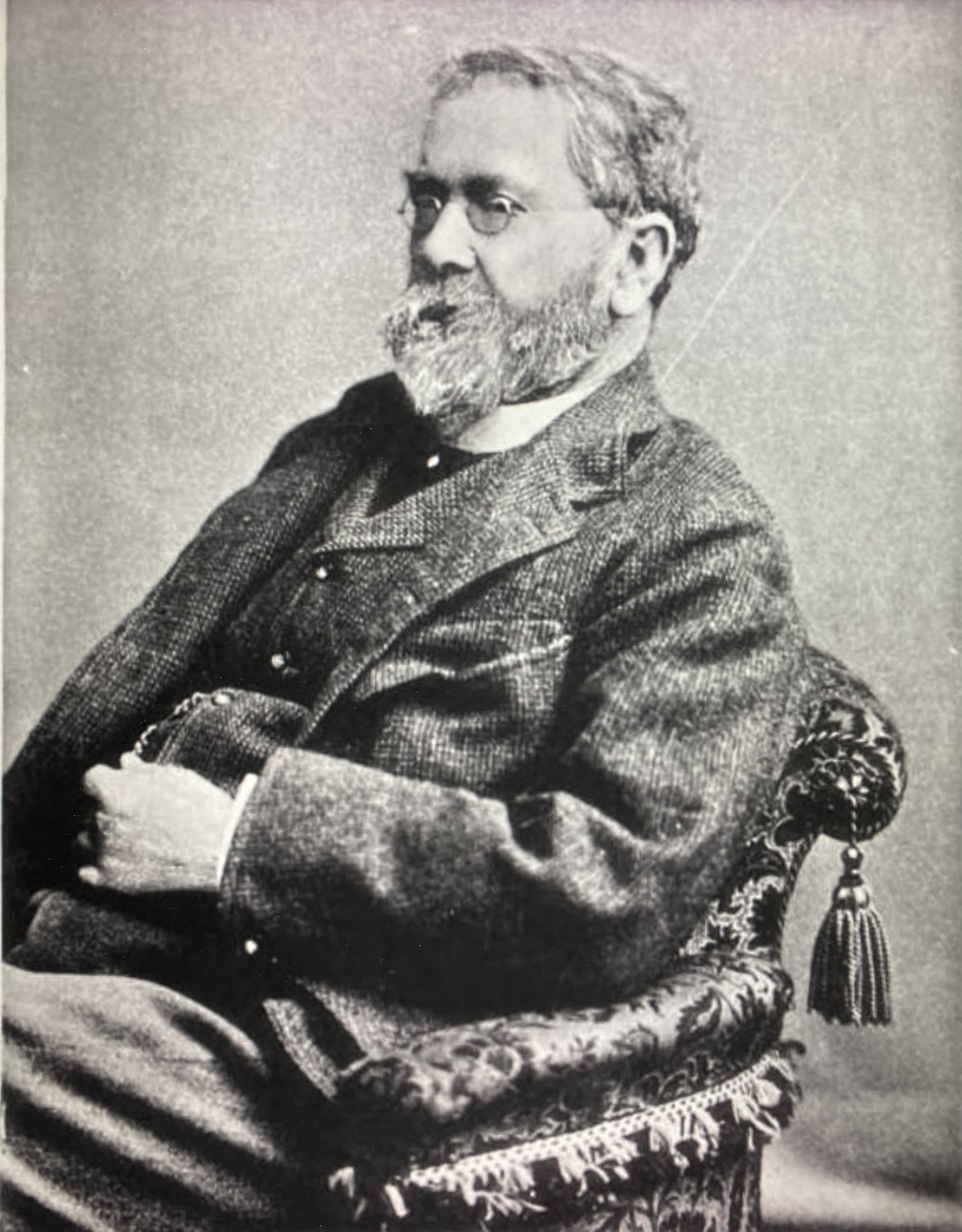
George Rae, 1887

George Rae (21 October 1817– 4 August 1902) was a British banker, Pre-Raphaelite art collector, author, businessman, parliamentary lobbyist, traveler and benefactor based in Liverpool, Birkenhead, and Oxton, Merseyside. He worked for The North and South Wales Bank (Wales Bank) between 1839 and 1898. He is known for his Pre-Raphaelite Art collection, being a patron of Dante Gabriel Rossetti, as well as his friendship with William Morris. He published two books on banking, The Internal Management of a Country Bank (1850) and The Country Banker, His Clients, Cares and Work' (1885). He was a founding trustee of the Institute of Bankers.

He was a patron of the Pre-Raphaelite Brotherhood, commissioning and acquiring works by Dante Gabriel Rossetti, Ford Madox Brown, Arthur Hughes and Edward Burne-Jones. His commissions included Rossetti's The Beloved, commissioned in 1863.

He also acquired paintings by the Liverpool school of painters influenced by the pre-Raphaelites, including works from William Joseph J.C. Bond, William Davis, James Campbell, John Edward Newton, Robert Tonge. He also acquired works from other artists influenced by and who followed the Pre-Raphaelite style, including George Price Boyce, John William Inchbold, Albert Joseph Moore, Valentine Cameron Prinsep, John Roddam Spencer Stanhope. He also acquired paintings by William Huggins.

== Early life ==
Rae was born on 21 October 1817, in Aberdeen, Scotland, to George Rae Snr, a Messenger-at-arms and Jean Edmond. Rae was the sixth of the ten children. Rae attended the Classical and Commercial Academy.

In 1835 Rae started working at a Scottish law firm, Adam and Anderson (co-founded by Alexander Anderson). In the following year, Rae joined the North of Scotland Banking Company as a branch accountant at Peterhead and later moved to work at Elgin and Keith branches.

=== 1839 - 1851: Early career with the 'Wales Bank' ===
In April 1839, Rae moved to Liverpool, where he became an inspector of branches at The North and South Wales Bank, (Wales Bank). In 1842 he was promoted to manager of Oswestry and in 1845 to General Manager of the Wales Bank. During his tenure as General Manager, Rae managed the Bank through the Panic of 1847 which resulted in the closing of the bank from 24 October 1847 until 3 January 1848 when it partially reopened and on 31 January 1848 when it fully reopened. In addition, Rae visited the bank’s branches and improved the control over the note issue.

Rae married Elspeth Kynoch on 13 March 1845 and moved to Birkenhead. They had three children, George Bentham (5 February 1846 – 23 February 1909), Edward (20 March 1847 – 26 June 1923), and Alice (24 December 1849 – 15 April 1939).

In 1850, Rae published under the pseudonym - Thomas Bullion - The Internal Management of a Country Bank - in a series of Letters on the Functions and Duties of a Branch Manager. In February 1851, Rae wrote to The Bankers' Magazine under his pseudonym Thomas Bullion advocating the setting up of a bankers' institute with a status and function parallel to the existing institutes for the sciences, arts, and other professions.

His wife died on 10 March 1851, leaving Rae a widower with 3 children.

== Career and art collecting ==
=== 1852 - 1862: Starting his Pre-Raphaelite art collection ===
In 1852, Rae attended the Liverpool Exhibition and saw the prize-winning painting A Huguenot, on St. Bartholomew's Day’ by John Everett Millais which formed Rae’s interest in Pre-Raphaelite painting that remained with him throughout his life.

Rae was appointed Chairman of the Commissioners of Birkenhead in 1854. With the assistance of John Laird (shipbuilder), Rae oversaw the reorganisation of the town’s finances.

In the following year on 26 April 1855 he married Julia Williams.

In 1857, Rae purchased two paintings by William Davis (artist), ‘Junction of the Liffey and Rye near Leixlip’ (1857) and ‘View on the Liffey near Leixlip’ (1857).

In 1859, Rae purchased his first Rossetti drawing ‘My Lady Greensleeves’. In 1860, he purchased ‘Among the Thames Willows’ by George Price Boyce . In 1861, Rae purchased An English Autumn Afternoon by Ford Madox Brown and ‘Mill on the Alyn, Denbighshire’ by John Edward Newton. At Christie's auction on 7 March 1862 (lot 164), Rae bought for £40.19 Rossetti’s ‘Wedding of St. George and the Princess Sabra’ that he had seen exhibited in 1858, and also (lot 46) for 26 guineas Edward Burne-Jones ‘The Wise and Foolish Virgins’ he had seen exhibited in 1859. Also, in 1862, Rae bought Rossetti’s ‘Fanny Cornforth’ and ‘The Heart of the Night’ alternately titled: ‘Mariana in the Moated Grange’. Rossetti also painted the water-colour of ‘Mariana in the South’, which Rae’s friend James Leathart was going to purchase for £50, but was instead bought by Rae.

=== 1863 - 1866: Acquisition of 'The Beloved' ===
In the spring of 1863, using as his model Marie Ford, Rossetti began a painting of Beatrice Portinari, the 12th-century noblewoman who inspired Dante Alighieri’s work for the collector and Rossetti's patron Ellen Heaton. Yet by December 1863, when the painting had transformed into ‘The Beloved’ and Heaton declined to buy it, Rae agreed to pay £300 for it to be completed.

Rae, one of Ford Madox Brown’s few patrons, commissioned ‘The Coat of Many Colours’, eventually taking delivery in 1866.

In 1864, Rae saw Rossetti’s ‘Fazio’s Mistress’ commissioned and exhibited by William Henry Blackmore, which Rae later purchased from him. Rossetti had begun to paint the nude ‘Venus Verticordia.’ Rae commissioned £105 a water-colour reduced copy for, masking the nudity with drapery at Rae’s request. In the same year, Rae purchased Rossetti drawings and also 6 Rossetti oil paintings from William Morris for £262 and paid Rossetti £35 for finishing the works. These were, ’The Damsel of the Sanc Grael’ (1857’), ‘Death of Breuse sans Pitié,’ ‘The Chapel before the Lists - Scene from “Morte Darthur” (1857), ‘The Tune of Seven Towers’ (1857), ‘The Blue Closet’ (1857), and ‘Paolo and Francesca da Rimini’ (1855). Also in 1864, Rae purchased ‘A Music Party’ (1864) by Arthur Hughes.

In May 1865, Rae visited Rossetti twice to view progress on ‘The Beloved'. He met with Arthur Hughes to commission him to paint ‘In the Grass’ which Rae exhibited later that year at the Liverpool Academy of Arts to oblige the artist. Rae purchased a painting by John William Inchbold ‘Venice from the Public Gardens’ upon a recommendation from James Leathart (future father-in-law of Rae’s son Edward Rae). Following a letter Rae received from Rossetti, Rae bought ‘A Fight for a Woman’ from him for 50 guineas.

On 21 July 1865, Rae joined the Board of the Wales Bank and was promoted to Managing Director.

On 5 October 1865, Rossetti wrote to Rae regarding progress on ‘The Beloved’. “I felt rather guilty towards you, if I was removing your favourite single eye, however, everyone thinks the new half face such an immense improvement, but I am sure you will agree in the general verdict. Flowers are one of the last elements to be painted in gold cup roses from chiffon.” ‘The Beloved’ was exhibited for one day on 21 February 1866 at the Arundel Club (Rossetti had joined the club in 1865), and then it was transported to Rae’s home where in March 1866, the Liverpool merchant John Miller (a fellow Scot) and Frederick Richards Leyland one of the largest British shipowners, visited Rae to view ‘The Beloved’.

=== 1866 - 1874: Expansion of Art collection and appointment as Chairman of the 'Wales Bank' ===
In 1866, while on business in London, Rae visited the offices of Overend, Gurney and Company. The Wales Bank had a considerable sum deposited with the Company. During his discussion with a partner, Rae gave his opinion that the Wales Bank would not have discounted the large acceptances from the Liverpool Merchants that the Company had discounted. Rae concluded that the Company could not be trusted with the deposits from the Wales Bank and so ordered the Company to transfer the Wales Bank deposits to another bank. This happened a few days before the Company went into liquidation. Rae's prompt action thus ensured the Wales Bank did not suffer any losses resulting from the failure of Overend, Gurney and Company

In 1866 Rae took delivery of Ford Madox Brown's painting ‘The Coat of Many Colours that he had commissioned in 1863.

In 1869, Rae acquired the original from the owner, William Henry Blackmore, of Rossetti’s ‘Monna Vanna’ originally entitled ‘Venus Veneta’ painted in 1866. Rae also acquired from Blackmore at the same time ‘Fazio’s Mistress’ that Rossetti had painted in 1863.

In December 1870, Rae took delivery of Rossetti’s ‘Sibylla Palmifera’ that he had commissioned in late 1865 for 300 guineas. Rossetti's sonnet entitled "Soul's Beauty" describes the subject, Sibyl, seated on a throne and bearing a branch of palm. In 1872, Rae purchased from Rossetti ‘Veronica Veronese'.

Rae was appointed Chairman & Managing Director of the Wales Bank in June 1873. Rae focused on upgrading the financial position of the Bank and management, improving the quality of statistical information about the distribution of funds. He gave a high priority to the selection and training of staff and the efficiency of book-keeping systems and ensured there was a large number of managers and clerks using the Welsh language.

In 1873, Rae sent some of Rossetti’s paintings to him at Kelmscott Manor the Gloucestershire home of Mr and Mrs William Morris - for retouching. ‘The Beloved’ was considerably altered, changing the tone, the heads of the bride, and the attendant on the right side and the bride’s left hand were made more ideal. ‘Monna Vanna’ was retouched, changing the clashing colours of the rings that had drawn criticism and lightening the hair. Rossetti named it ‘Belcolore'. In 1874, a second version of the ‘Damsel of the Sanct Grael’ was painted in oil for Rae, and he had previously purchased ‘Lucrezia Borgia.'

Rae participated in the establishment and promotion of the Association of Country Bankers in 1874. In the following year, on 21 June 1875 he gave evidence to the Parliamentary Select Committee on Banks of Issue, during which Rae voiced his lifelong objection to the Bank Charter Act 1844. He was supported by Sir Robert Harry Inglis Palgrave, who also was a critic of the Act's failure in 1844 to regulate the banking reserve of the Bank of England and was a stalwart defender of notes issued by the country banks.

=== 1875: Publication of Rae's art collection ===
On 2 and 9 October 1875, Frederic George Stephens, an art critic and a non-artistic member of the Pre-Raphaelite Brotherhood, published a description of many of Rae’s paintings in the weekly periodical The Athenaeum.

The articles confirmed the provenance of the paintings owned by Rae including 15 Rossetti’s, as well Albert Joseph Moore, ‘Dancing Girl Reposing’. Ford Madox Brown was represented by ‘Joseph’s Coat’ (the Coat of Many Colours), ‘The Death of Sir Tristram’ and 'An English Autumn Afternoon’, John Roddam Spencer Stanhope was represented by ‘Ariadne of Naaue’, ‘The Wine Press’ and ‘Juliet and the Nurse’, as well as other pictures. The publication listed paintings by local Birkenhead artist James Campbell, ‘News from my Laddie’ and ‘Thorough Bess’, by Arthur Hughes, the ‘Music Party’, ‘Good Night’ and ‘In the Grass’. There were 10 paintings by William Davis, ‘Young Trespassers’, ‘Twilight, Bidstone Mill’, ‘The Mersey from Runcorn’, ‘Farm Yard’, ‘Beeches near Allerton’, ‘Early Summer’, ‘Ripe Corn’, ‘The Old House at Hale’, ‘Twilight, Oxton Common’ and ‘Wallasey Mill.’ Rae bought 28 paintings from Davis. There were also paintings by George Price Boyce and Valentine Cameron "Val" Prinsep.

=== 1876 - 1879: A new home: Redcourt ===
In 1876, Rae commissioned, another Oxton resident and Liverpool-based architect, Edmund Kirby to build his house ‘Redcourt’ (now Redcourt Manor, converted into 15 apartments in 2022 ) on approximately one acre of land he had acquired just off Devonshire Road. Kirby was known to Rae having designed some branches for the Wales Bank. Rae’s new home, Redcourt, was completed in 1879 with the wallpaper throughout by William Morris.

=== 1879 - 1880: Institute of Bankers and Limited Liability for Banks ===
On 11 March 1879, Rae was a founding Vice-President and Trustee of the Institute of Bankers. This coincided with Rae spending time in London to meet with Sir Stafford Northcote, 1st Earl of Iddesleigh Chancellor of the Exchequer. Rae persuaded William Shaw (Irish politician) MP to accept Rae’s amendments that enabled the passing of the Banking and Joint Stock Companies Bill of 1879 which enabled banks to adopt limited liability.

=== 1885: Publication of The Country Banker ===
In 1884, Frank Holl painted a portrait of George Rae.

In 1885, Rae published The Country Banker: His Clients, Cares, and Work. On the title page, Rae states the book is ‘From an Experience of Forty Years by George Rae, author of ‘Bullion's Letters to a Bank Manager’. The book contains 41 letters on all aspects of banking, each of which is introduced with a well-known quotation, e.g. ‘Personal Credit’, “My meaning in saying he is a good man is to have you understand that he is sufficient: yet his means are in supposition.” quoted from Shakespeare’s, The Merchant of Venice. The book was frequently reprinted in London, Toronto, and New York. On 8 August 1885, The Economist wrote: "We have seldom taken up a book on the business of banking which is at once so interesting and so full of shrewd common sense as this of Mr Rae’s".

== 1886 - 1902: Declining health and death ==
In the Spring of 1886, acting upon the advice of Dr. Sir William Broadbent, Rae holidayed in the French Riviera accompanied by his wife, daughter Alice, and his son Edward. He wrote in his diary: “my eyes are better, but I am still in bluish grey blinkers, which makes everything look as if it is seen under a shadow of an eclipse”.

Rae was ill in the summer of 1893 and did not return to work until the summer of 1894. Rae was replaced by Thomas Brocklebank as Chairman of the Wales Bank in January 1898. On 15 March 1898, Rae retired from the Board of the Wales Bank.

In 1898 and 1899, Rae privately published two volumes of his personal diaries, ‘Holiday Rambles by Land and Sea’ covering his holidays between 1865 and 1890, sailing around the Western Isles and The Channel Islands; and his journeys to Egypt and throughout Europe.

In 1899, Henry Currie Marillier published ‘Dante Gabriel Rossetti, An Illustrated Memorial of His Art and Life’ containing eleven photos of Rae’s Rossetti artwork, commenting that Rae’s collection together with Ellen Heaton’s were acknowledged to be the only Rossetti collections that had survived intact.

On 10 March 1900 Rae purchased from H. Virtue-Tebbs at the Christie auction lot 38, ‘Windermere' by Ford Madox Brown, that Rae has seen exhibited at Liverpool Exhibition in 1856.

George Rae died at his home of Redcourt on 4 August 1902. His obituary was published in the Liverpool Daily Post on 5 August 1902 and also in The Bankers’ Insurance Managers’ and Agents Magazine, Volume LXXIV September 1902. The magazine also published a list of 95 artworks owned by Rae including 19 by Dante Gabriel Rossetti, 6 by Ford Madox Brown, 5 by Arthur Hughes, 1 by Edward Burne-Jones, 28 by William Davis, 11 by William Bond, and 6 by Spencer Stanhope.

In his will Rae donated £1,250 to 12 local Liverpool charities. He was buried in Flaybrick Hill Cemetery (now Flaybick Memorial Gardens). St Saviours Church in Oxton contains the West window with a dedication to Rae. It is the work of Sir Edward Burne-Jones and originally executed by Morris & Co.

== Family and legacy ==
In April 1902, Rae endowed the sum of £1,500 to the University College of North Wales, Bangor (Bangor University), to create a Chair in the lectureship in banking and currency. George Rae's lectures were delivered until 1920 and again between 1987 and 2007. The George Rae Prize was awarded for the highest marks in the Institute of Banking exam: Practice of Banking.

George Rae’s older brother, John Rae, emigrated to Australia in 1839 and became one of the three Commissioners that administered the city of Sydney.

His widow Julia lived at Redcourt until her death on 20 November 1915. In 1916 twelve Rossettis were purchased by the National Gallery, now owned by Tate Britain including ‘The Beloved’ £3,000 and ‘Monna Vanna’ £2,000. Ford Madox Brown ‘An English Autumn Afternoon’ £810 was purchased by the Birmingham Museums Trust.
