= Joan of Arc Kissing the Sword of Deliverance =

Painting by Dante Gabriel Rossetti

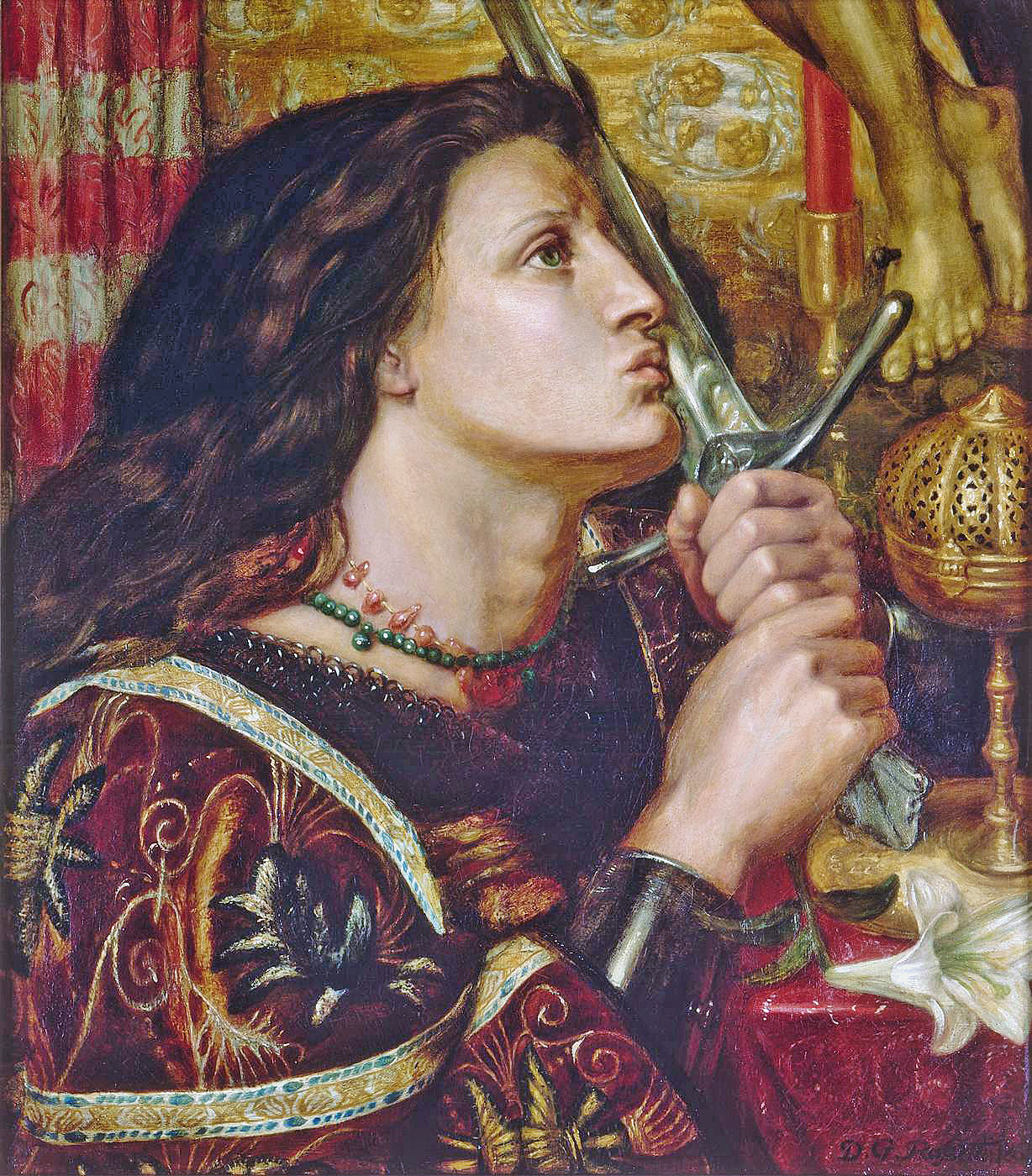
- Artist: Dante Gabriel Rossetti
- Year: 1863
- Medium: Oil on canvas
- Movement: Pre-Raphaelite Brotherhood
- Subject: Joan of Arc
- Dimensions: 61.2 cm × 53.2 cm (24.1 in × 20.9 in)
- Location: Musée d'Art moderne et contemporain Musée des Beaux-Arts, Strasbourg
- Accession: 1996

Joan of Arc Kissing the Sword of Deliverance is an 1863 painting by the English artist Dante Gabriel Rossetti. It was bought for the Strasbourg Museum of Modern and Contemporary Art (MAMCS) at the Piccadilly Gallery in 1996, as the first Rossetti painting ever bought by a French museum. Its inventory number is 55.996.8.1.

The model for the painting has a noticeably big chin and strong neck. She may have been a Mrs. Beyer from Germany, or an acquaintance of Rossetti's named Agnes Manetti. The painting is on permanent loan from the MAMCS to the Musée des Beaux-Arts in Palais Rohan.

== See also ==
- List of paintings by Dante Gabriel Rossetti
