= John Rae (administrator) =

Australian administrator, painter, and author (1813–1900)

John Rae (9 January 1813 – 15 July 1900) was an Australian administrator, painter and author.

John Rae was born on 9 January 1813 at Aberdeen, Scotland, the son of George Rae, Messenger-at-Arms, and his wife Jean, née Edmond. His younger brother was George Rae, a British banker and Pre-Raphaelite Art Collector based in Liverpool. He was educated at the Aberdeen Grammar School, Marischal College and University of Aberdeen. He studied law and graduated Master of Arts in 1832. In 1839, Rae moved to Australia.

He married Elizabeth Anne Thompson (born on 5 April 1817 at Sydney) on 17 December 1845 in Sydney. They had 8 children. He died on 15 July 1900.
