= The Blessed Damozel =

Poem and painting by Dante Gabriel Rossetti

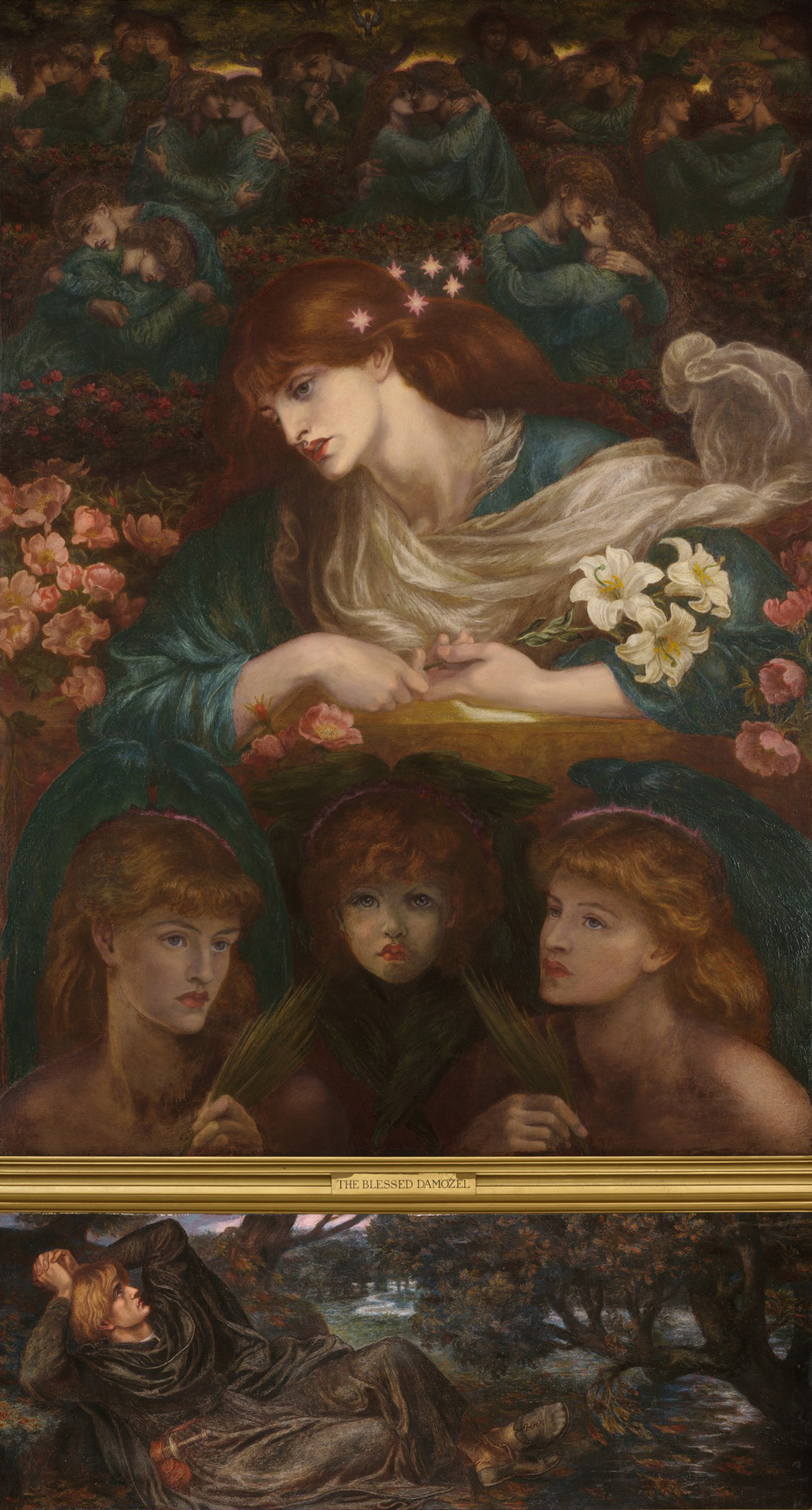
- Artist: Dante Gabriel Rossetti
- Year: 1875–1878
- Medium: Oil on canvas
- Dimensions: 174 cm × 94 cm (69 in × 37 in)
- Location: Lady Lever Art Gallery, Port Sunlight, England

"The Blessed Damozel" is perhaps the best known poem by Dante Gabriel Rossetti, as well as the title of his painting (and its replica) illustrating the subject. The poem was first published in 1850 in the Pre-Raphaelite journal The Germ. Rossetti subsequently revised the poem twice and republished it in 1856, 1870 and 1873. The poem has 24 stanzas of 6 lines each, totalling 144 lines.

== Poem ==
The poem was partially inspired by Edgar Allan Poe's poem "The Raven", with its depiction of a lover grieving on Earth over the death of his loved one. Rossetti chose to represent the situation in reverse. The poem describes the damozel observing her lover from heaven, and her unfulfilled yearning for their reunion in heaven. The first four stanzas of the poem are inscribed on the frame of the painting:

The blessed damozel leaned out
From the gold bar of Heaven;
Her eyes were deeper than the depth
Of waters stilled at even;
She had three lilies in her hand,
And the stars in her hair were seven.

Her robe, ungirt from clasp to hem,
No wrought flowers did adorn,
But a white rose of Mary's gift,
For service meetly worn;
Her hair that lay along her back
Was yellow like ripe corn.

Herseemed she scarce had been a day
One of God's choristers;
The wonder was not yet quite gone
From that still look of hers;
Albeit, to them she left, her day
Had counted as ten years.

(To one, it is ten years of years.
. . . Yet now, and in this place,
Surely she leaned o'er me—her hair
Fell all about my face. . . .
Nothing: the autumn fall of leaves.
The whole year sets apace.)

== Paintings ==
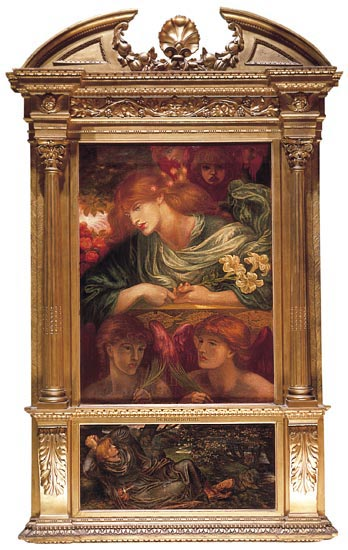
Replica by Rossetti, 1879, sold to Frederick Leyland. Now at the Lady Lever Art Gallery.

The Blessed Damozel is the only one of Rossetti's paired pictures and poems in which the poem was completed first. Friends and patrons repeatedly urged Rossetti to illustrate his most famous poem, and he finally accepted a commission from William Graham in February 1871. After the work was completed Graham requested a predella, the lower part of the painting, on 31 December 1877. His total cost was £1157. Alexa Wilding modelled the damozel in Paradise, Wilfred John Hawtrey modelled the child–angel, and the probable model for the left–hand angel was May Morris.

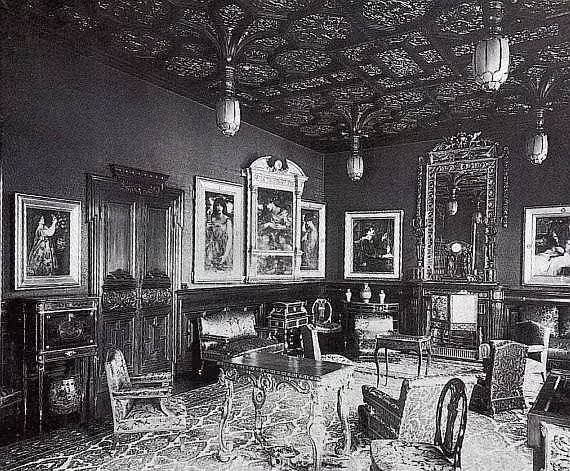
Six Rossetti paintings as hung in Leyland's drawing room, 1892. The Blessed Damozel hangs third from the left. (Click on any painting for its article.)

Another, later version is in the Lady Lever Art Gallery. Frederick Richards Leyland commissioned eighteen paintings from Rossetti, not counting unfulfilled commissions. Soon after Leyland acquired his first Rossetti painting, he and Rossetti explored the idea of a Rossetti triptych, which was eventually formed with Mnemosyne, an 1879 replica of The Blessed Damozel painted by Rossetti himself, and Proserpine. Three additional Rossetti paintings were then hung in Leyland's drawing room, all of which Leyland called "stunners."

== Music ==
Several pieces of music were based on the poem, including those for orchestra by Debussy, Granville Bantock (1891), Edgar Bainton (1907), Ernest Farrar (1907); for piano by Arnold Bax (1906); for string quartet by Benjamin Burrows (1927); and a 1928 choral by Julius Harrison.

The poem was the inspiration for Claude Debussy's La Damoiselle élue (1888), a cantata for two soloists, female choir, and orchestra.

A 2007 popular song of the same name by Tangerine Dream appears on their album Madcap's Flaming Duty.

== See also ==
- List of paintings by Dante Gabriel Rossetti
- Elsie Whitaker Martinez

== Sources ==
- Treuherz, Julian; Prettejohn, Elizabeth; Becker, Edwin (2003). Dante Gabriel Rossetti. London New York, N.Y: Thames & Hudson. ISBN 0-500-09316-4.
- Wildman, Stephen; Laurel Bradley; Deborah Cherry; John Christian; David B. Elliott; Betty Elzea; Margaretta Fredrick; Caroline Hannah; Jan Marsh; Gayle Seymour (2004). Waking Dreams, the Art of the Pre-Raphaelites from the Delaware Art Museum. Art Services International. p. 395.
