= Roman Widow (Rossetti) =

Painting by Dante Gabriel Rossetti

- Dis Manibus
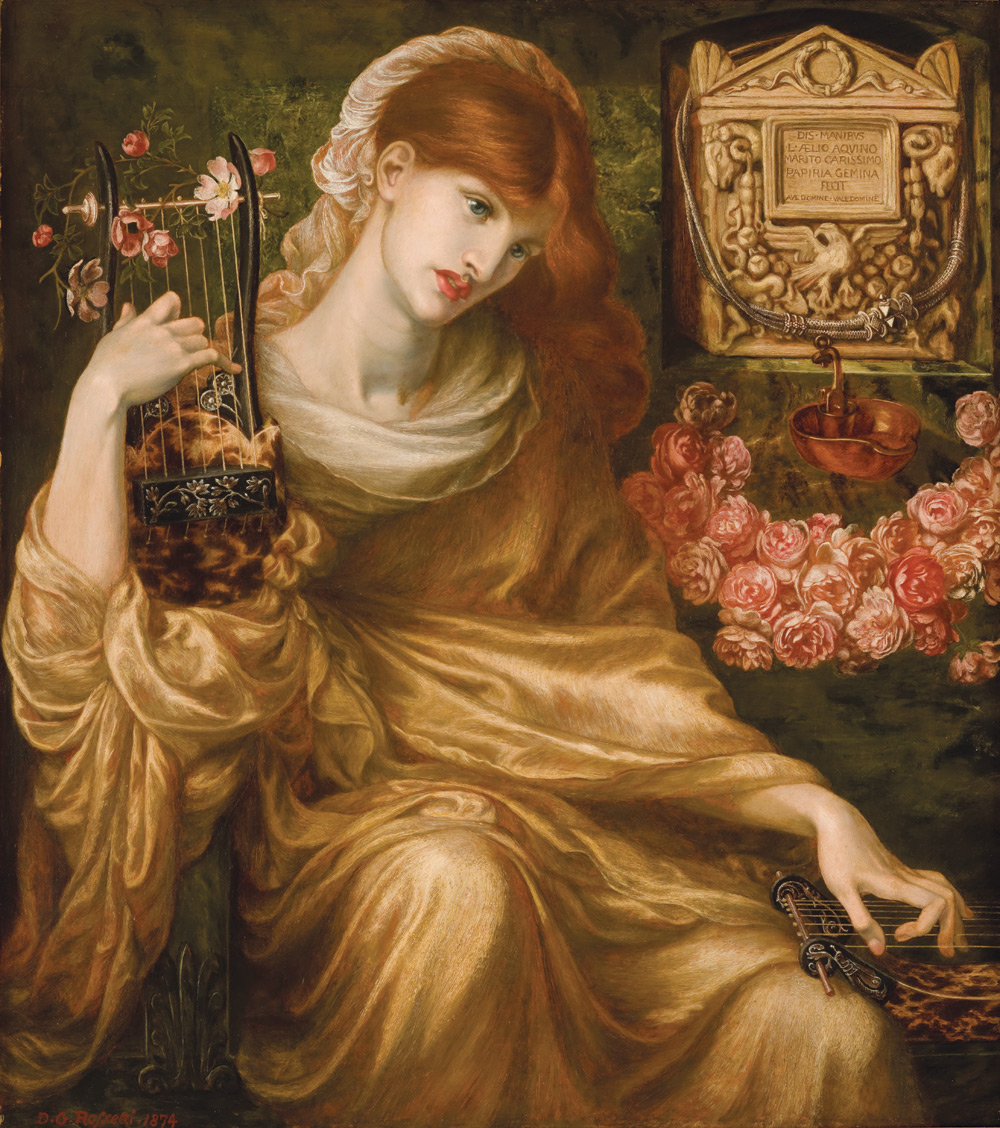
- Artist: Dante Gabriel Rossetti
- Completion date: 1874
- Type: Oil paint on canvas
- Dimensions: 104.8 cm × 93.3 cm (41.3 in × 36.7 in)
- Location: Museo de Arte de Ponce, Ponce, Puerto Rico

Roman Widow or Dîs Manibus is an oil on canvas painting executed in 1874 by the English Pre-Raphaelite artist Dante Gabriel Rossetti. It is in the collection of the Museo de Arte de Ponce in Puerto Rico.

It depicts a young Roman widow, modelled by Alexa Wilding, sitting in a sepulchre by her late husband's cinerary urn, around which is wound her bridal girdle. She is dressed in classical mourning drapery and playing an elegy on two small harps, one with each hand. Pink roses, the flowers of Venus and symbolic of love, wreath both the harp and the urn.

Rossetti's alternative title of Dîs Manibus refers to the prefix of the urn's inscription. A common epithet on Roman funerary monuments, often abbreviated to D M and meaning "to the Manes" or ghosts of the dead, it can be loosely translated as "to the memory of". The remainder of the text reads L. AELIO AQUINO - MARITO CARISSIMO - PAPIRIA GEMINA FECIT - AVE DOMINE VALE DOMINE which translates as L Aelio Aquino - Dearest Husband - Papiria Gemina made this [urn] - Hail Master Farewell Master.

The painting with its theme of enduring love for the departed is contemporaneous with and similar in style and spirit to other Rossetti works such as A Sea-Spell and Veronica Veronese.

== See also ==
- List of paintings by Dante Gabriel Rossetti
