= A Sea-Spell =

Painting by Dante Gabriel Rossetti

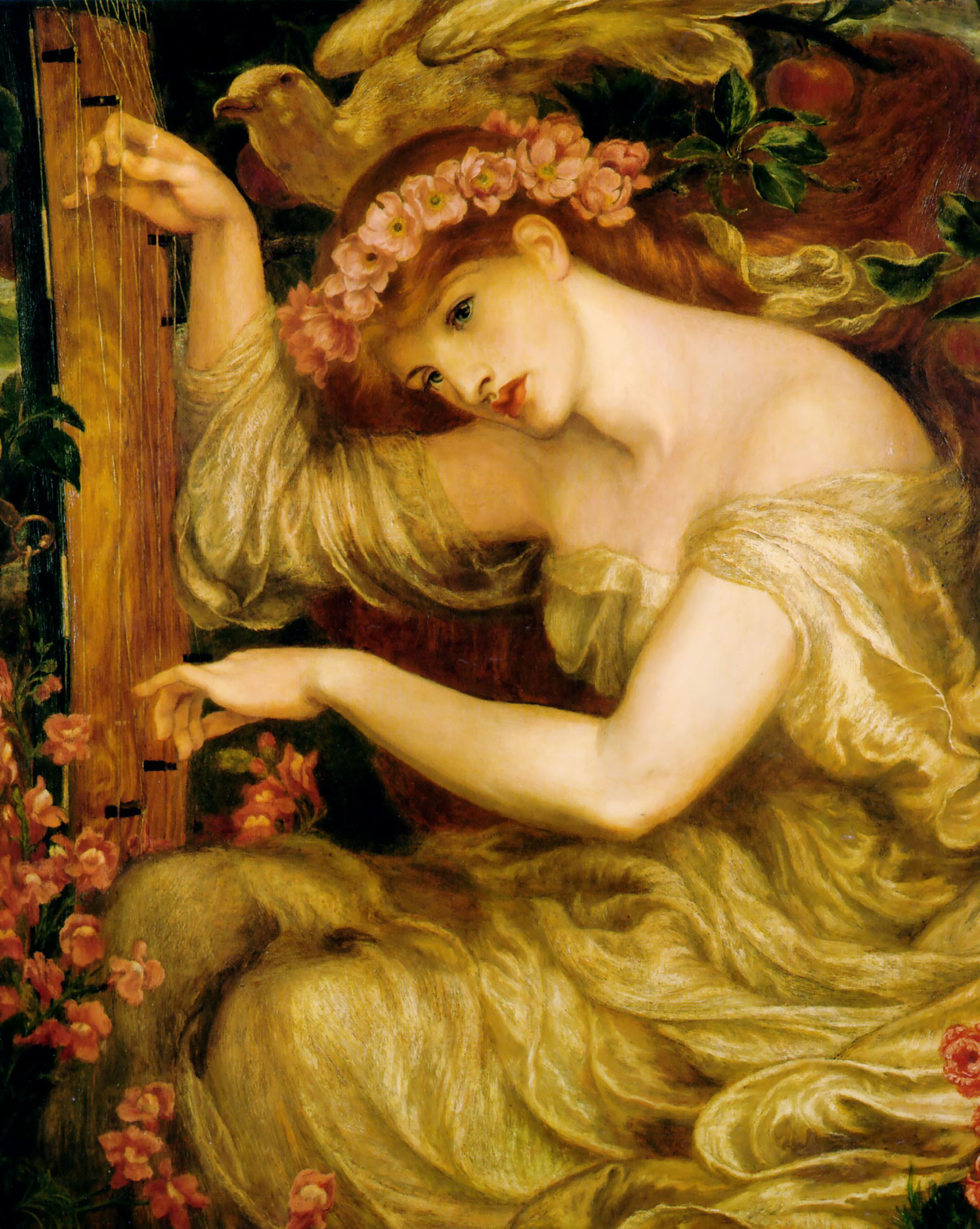
- Artist: Dante Gabriel Rossetti
- Completion date: 1877
- Type: Oil paint on canvas
- Dimensions: 111.5 cm × 93 cm (43.9 in × 37 in)
- Location: Harvard Art Museums; Cambridge, Massachusetts
- Accession: Gift of Grenville L. Winthrop
- Website: harvardartmuseums.org/art/230614

A Sea-Spell is an oil painting of 1877 and an accompanying sonnet of 1869 by the English artist Dante Gabriel Rossetti, depicting a siren playing an instrument to lure sailors. It is now in the Harvard Art Museums in Cambridge, Massachusetts.

== Painting ==
=== Description ===
The painting depicts a siren in human form playing a musical instrument "in a thoughtful reverie", surrounded by apples, apple blossoms, and a seagull. The instrument being played has been described as a harp and as "somewhat related to the psaltery"; according to an analysis published in the journal Music in Art, it is an unusually short Japanese koto, a traditional 13-stringed zither-like instrument.

The artist's brother William Michael Rossetti described the subject as "a Siren, or Sea-Fairy, whose lute summons a sea-bird to listen, and whose song will prove fatal to some fascinated mariner".

=== Execution ===
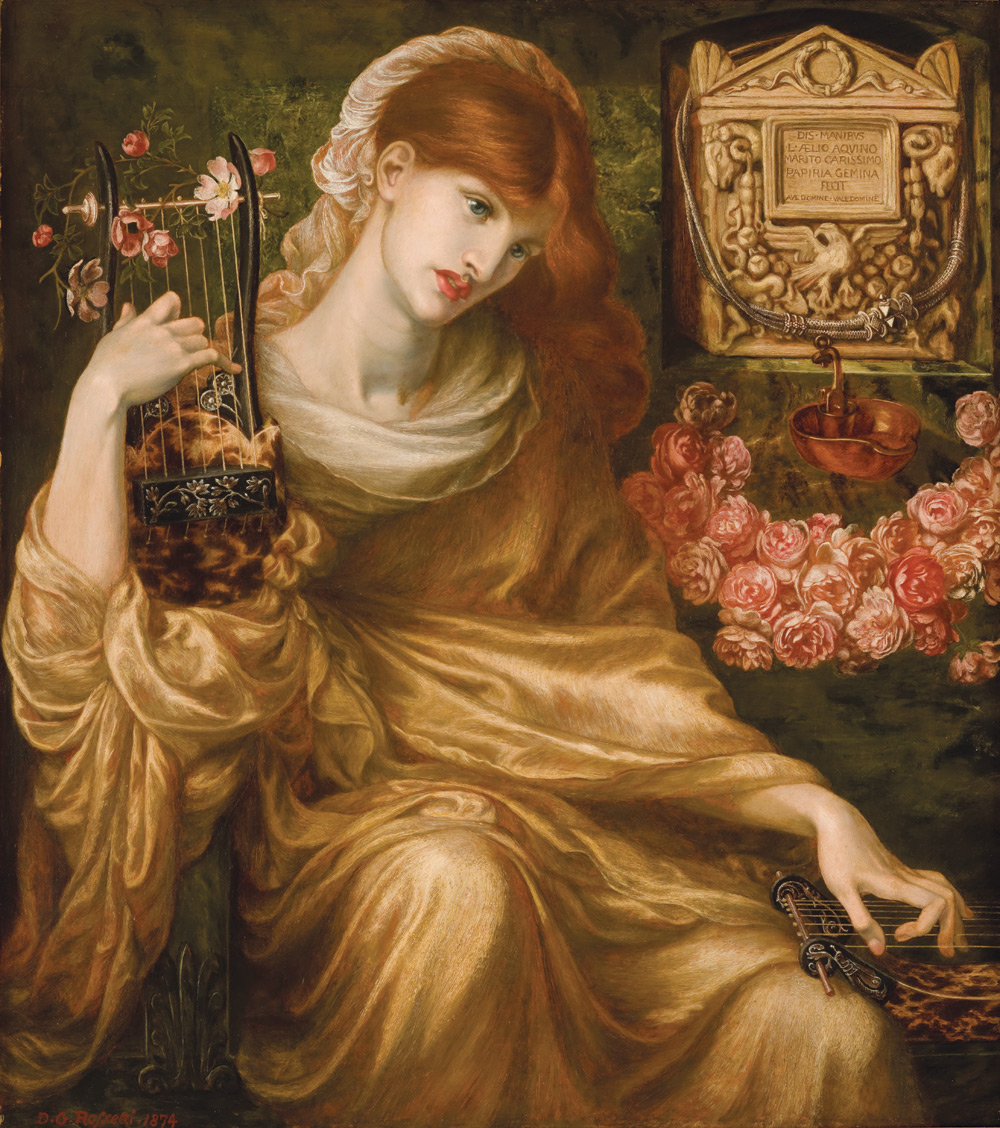
Rossetti's The Roman Widow (1874), a work from the same period

In 1873, Rossetti made a drawing of a sea-maiden playing an instrument, titled Ligeia Siren, as a preliminary study for A Sea-Spell. He had begun work on the painting itself by 18 August 1875. His brother wrote that Gabriel painted the work, along with another half-length figure painting called The Roman Widow, after his patron Frederick Richards Leyland "suggested" that he was interested in buying several such paintings. Leyland later denied making a commitment to do so.

The model was Alexa Wilding, one of Rossetti's several muses. A Sea-Spell was a companion to Veronica Veronese, for which Wilding also modeled. Rossetti was assisted by an unidentified naturalist in finding and positioning the stuffed seagull used in the painting, which led to some delay.

== Poem ==
Rossetti wrote a sonnet in 1869 as a "double" of the painting completed years later, as he did for several other works in the same period. The text of the poem is as follows:

Her lute hangs shadowed in the apple-tree,
While flashing fingers weave the sweet-strung spell
Between its chords; and as the wild notes swell,
The sea-bird for those branches leaves the sea.
But to what sound her listening ear stoops she?
What netherworld gulf-whispers doth she hear,
In answering echoes from what planisphere,
Along the wind, along the estuary?

She sinks into her spell: and when full soon
Her lips move and she soars into her song,
What creatures of the midmost main shall throng
In furrowed surf-clouds to the summoning rune:
Till he, the fated mariner, hears her cry,
And up her rock, bare-breasted, comes to die?

== Critical reception and analysis ==
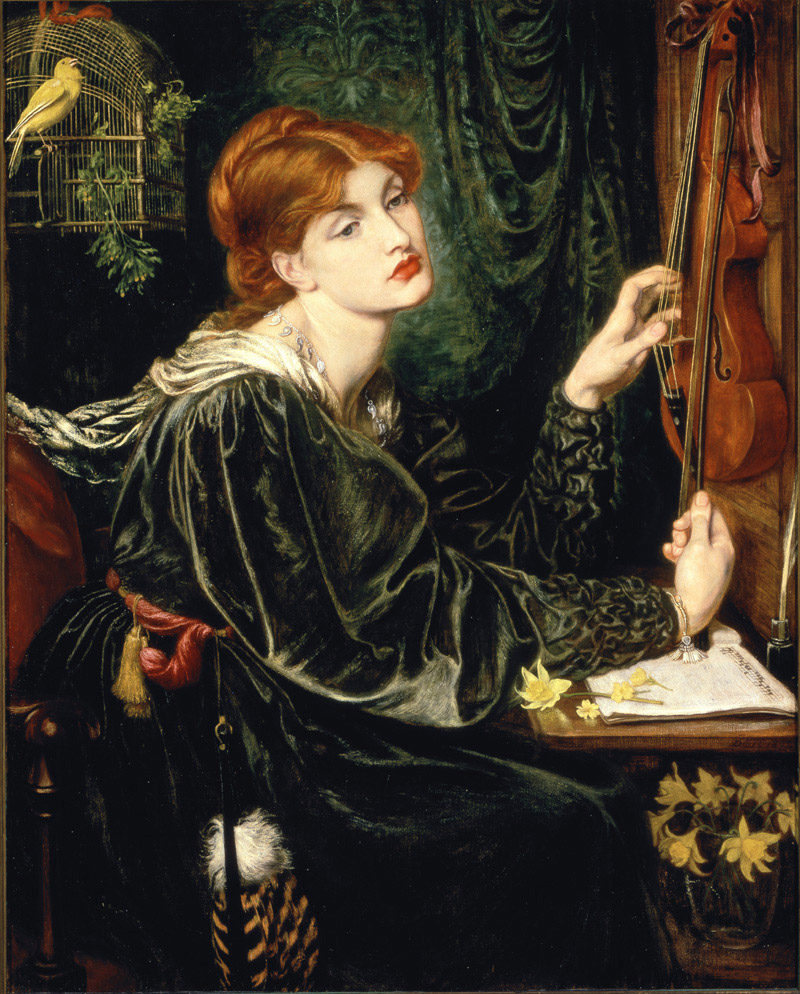
Veronica Veronese (1872), another companion to A Sea-Spell

Jerome McGann wrote that the painting is a "failure", caused by Rossetti's excessive intellectualizing of his work; previous critics suggested, to the contrary, that the work is flawed due to Rossetti's "slipshod" execution.

The scholar Helene E. Roberts wrote that the painting is one of a group of depictions of Rossetti's "ideal woman". She wrote that the iconic image of womanhood dominated Rossetti's "dream world", and that the painting is intended to evoke similar reveries in the viewer, citing its musical theme as a prompt for "indolent musing". She argued that, although the combination of daydreaming and womanhood in A Sea-Spell could be pornographic, Rossetti encourages more spiritual responses, emphasizing the subject's face and making her exposed arms "masculine, or at best matronly".

Lucien Agosta argued that the piece illustrates a common theme in Rossetti's work, of Art as independent of – and triumphant over – Nature. He noted that Rossetti, in a letter, had written that the subject's song was a "magic lay" and that the sonnet describes unnatural "netherland gulf-whispers", and that the siren's attraction of a bird to listen to her song inverts the relationship of Veronica Veronese, in which the musician is inspired by a bird.

== History ==
The painting was owned by Leyland, who may have acquired it from Rossetti, and was sold through Christie's in 1892. It was owned by T. F. Wigley, David Croal Thomson, and William Hulme, Viscount Leverhulme, who sold it in 1926 through Anderson Galleries of New York. Anderson Galleries sold it to another New York dealer, Scott & Fowles, from whom the lawyer and art collector Grenville L. Winthrop purchased it in 1935. Winthrop donated the work to the Fogg Art Museum of his alma mater, Harvard University, in 1939.

A Sea-Spell was exhibited in a posthumous exhibition of Rossetti's work at the Burlington Fine Arts Club in London in 1883; in the National Gallery of South Australia, on loan from Wigley, in 1899; in a Rossetti-centered exhibition at the University of Kansas Museum of Art in 1958; at the National Museum of Western Art of Tokyo in 2002; and as part of many Fogg Art Museum and Harvard Art Museums exhibitions. It is currently on display on the second floor of the Harvard Art Museums.

== See also ==
- List of paintings by Dante Gabriel Rossetti
