= Ecce Ancilla Domini! =

Painting by Dante Gabriel Rossetti

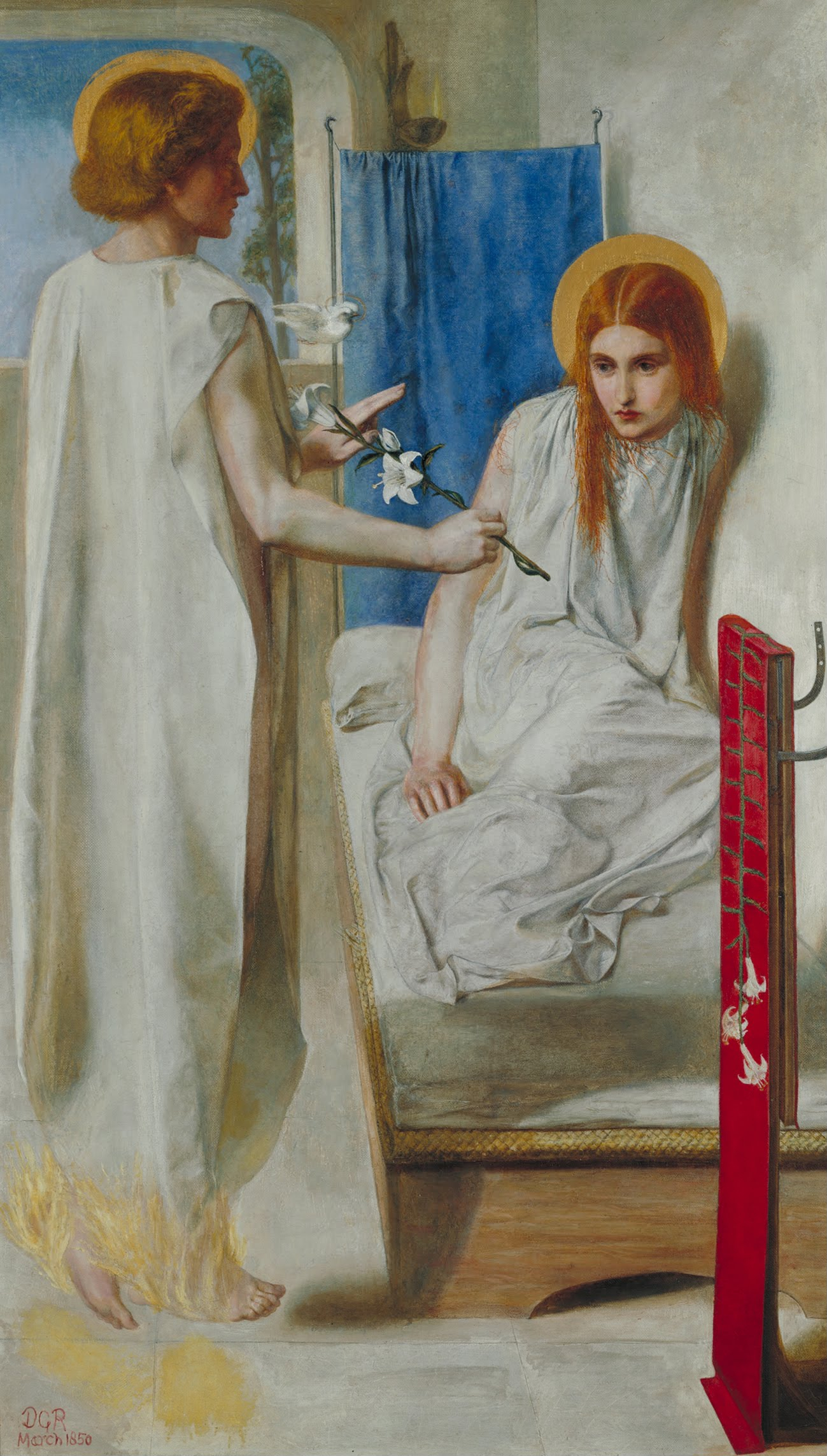
- Artist: Dante Gabriel Rossetti
- Year: 1850
- Medium: Oil on canvas
- Dimensions: 73 cm × 41.9 cm (29 in × 16.5 in)
- Location: Tate Britain, London

Ecce Ancilla Domini! (Latin: "Behold the handmaiden of the Lord"), or The Annunciation, is an oil painting by the English artist Dante Gabriel Rossetti, first painted in 1850 and now in Tate Britain in London. The Latin title is a quotation from the Vulgate text of the first chapter of the Gospel of Saint Luke, describing the Annunciation, where Mary accepts the message brought to her by the Angel Gabriel that she would give birth to a child (Jesus) by God.

The title is correctly Ecce Ancilla Domini!, but many sources ignore the exclamation mark.

== Composition ==
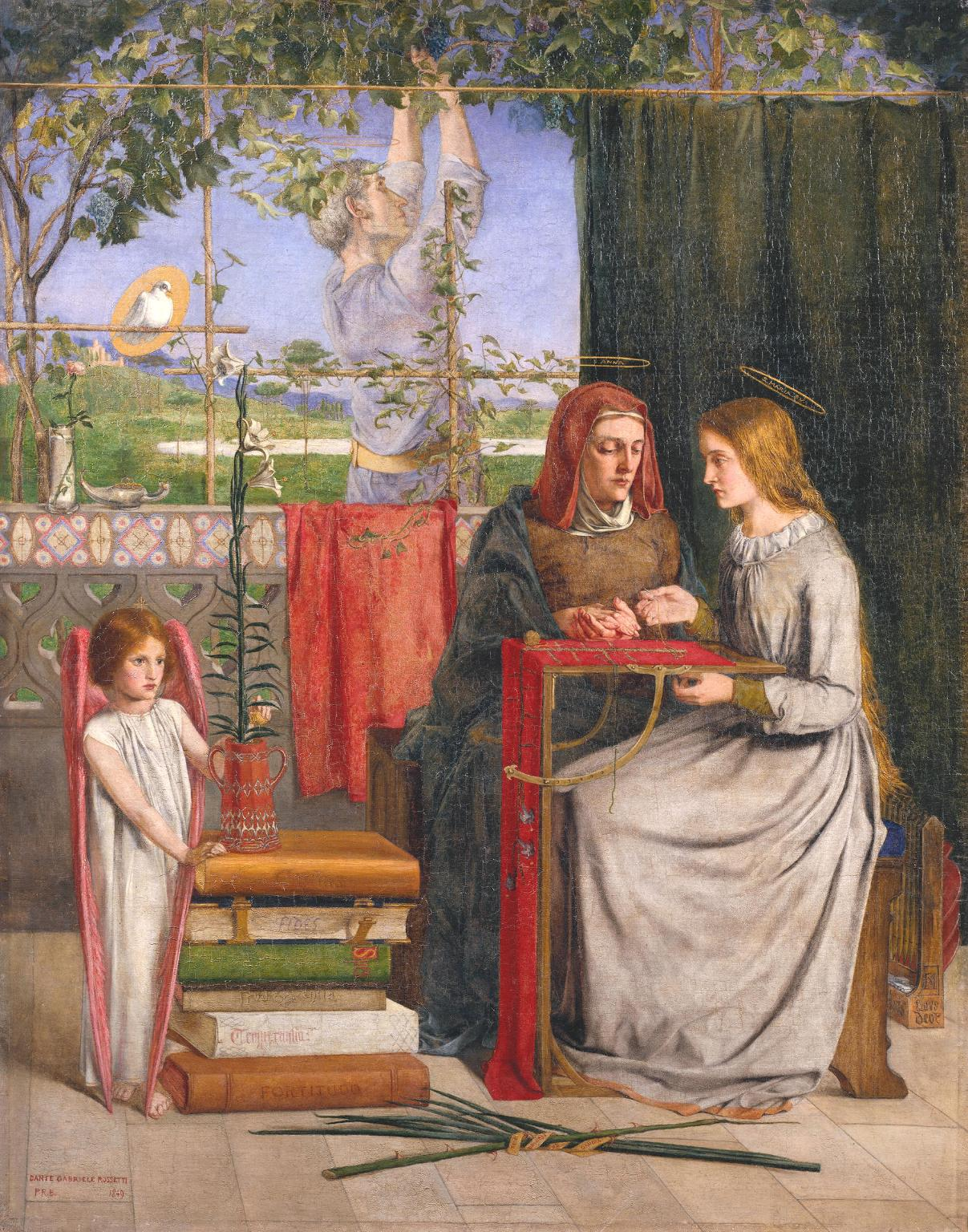
The Girlhood of Mary Virgin by Rossetti (1849), Tate Britain.

Rossetti deliberately used a limited colour range for this oil painting. The predominance of white, symbolic of virginity, is complemented by vibrant blue (a colour associated with Mary, though notably not used in his The Girlhood of Mary Virgin in 1849) and red, for Christ's blood. Lilies are traditionally the symbol of Mary in Italian Renaissance art, but they are also considered funereal flowers, indicative of Christ's death. Also noted is that in the 'Girlhood' painting from the year before, Mary is at work on a red vestment held on a hinged frame, the very same as seen here at her bed end.

== History ==
The artist's sister, Christina Rossetti, posed for Mary. As with her previous year's modelling, her brother altered her hair colour: in this instance, he made it auburn to continue the red palette. His brother William posed for Gabriel.

This painting received mixed reviews. The most obvious break with tradition was Rossetti's choice of placing Mary in bed - her long nightgown suggestive of a newly-wed bride - woken by the angel, who is normally depicted appearing as Mary prays. Also controversial were Gabriel's lack of wings (the flames at his feet suggest a Classical influence) and his obvious nakedness, glimpsed through the side of his robe. Note also the dove's halo, and the differences between Mary's and Gabriel's haloes, which may have arisen because Mary's was painted in 1850, whereas Gabriel's was not added until 1853.

The painting was first exhibited in April 1850 at the Old Portland Gallery on Regent Street. Francis McCracken, a well known Pre-Raphaelite patron, bought it in 1853 for £50 and the Tate Gallery purchased it in 1886. It is displayed at Tate Britain in the Historic and Early British Modern Art section.

== See also ==
- List of paintings by Dante Gabriel Rossetti
- Rossetti and His Circle by Max Beerbohm
- Rossetti-Polidori family tree
