= List of paintings by Dante Gabriel Rossetti =

This is a list of paintings by the British Pre-Raphaelite artist Dante Gabriel Rossetti. Most painting details are referenced from the Rossetti Archive, with some additional paintings researched from The Walker Art Gallery.

== 1840s ==
Image	Name	Year	Current Location	Ref
	Self-portrait	1847 pencil and chalk	National Portrait Gallery, London	
	Bottles	1848	Delaware Art Museum, Wilmington	
	Mary's Girlhood (For a Picture) or The Girlhood of Mary Virgin	1848–49	Tate Britain, London	
	The Laboratory	1849 (watercolour)	Birmingham Museum & Art Gallery, UK	

== 1850s ==
Image	Name	Year	Current Location	Ref
	"Hist!", Said Kate the Queen	1851	Eton College	
	Ecce Ancilla Domini! or The Annunciation	1850	Tate Britain, London	
	Borgia	1851	Tullie House Museum and Art Gallery, Carlisle	
	Two Mothers	1852	Sudley House, Liverpool	
	Carlisle Wall or The Lovers	1853 (watercolour)	Tate Britain, London	
	The First Anniversary of the Death of Beatrice or Dante drawing an angel	1853 (watercolour)	Ashmolean Museum, Oxford	
	Elizabeth Siddal	1854	Delaware Art Museum, Wilmington	
	Found	1854	Delaware Art Museum, Wilmington	
	Paolo and Francesca da Rimini	1855	Tate Britain, London	
	The Annunciation	1855 (watercolour)	Agnew's Gallery, London	
	Arthur's Tomb or The last meeting of Launcelot and Guenevere	1855 (watercolour)	British Museum, London	
	Dante's Vision of Rachel and Leah	1855	Tate Britain, London	
	The Passover in the Holy Family: Gathering Bitter Herbs	1855–56	Tate Britain, London	
	The Blue Closet	1856–57	Tate Britain, London	
	Dante's Dream on the Day of the Death of Beatrice: 9th of June, 1290 or Dante's Dream at the Time of the Death of Beatrice	1856 , watercolour, repeated in oil in 1871	Tate Britain, London	
	Mary in the House of St. John	1858	Delaware Art Museum, Wilmington	
	The Damsel of the Sanct Grael	1857	Tate Britain, London	
	The Gate of Memory	1857 (watercolour)	The Makins Collection	
	Mary Magdalene Leaving the House of Feasting	1857	Tate Britain, London	
	Mary Nazarene	1857	Tate Britain, London	
	The Tune of the Seven Towers	1857	Tate Britain, London	
	The Wedding of St. George and the Princess Sabra	1857	Tate Britain, London	
	The Death of Breuze Sans Pitié	1857–65 (watercolour)	Virginia Surtees	
	The Harp Player	1857	private collection	
	Writing on the Sand	1857–58	British Museum, London	
	St. Catherine	1857	Tate Britain, London	
	Chapel Before the Lists	1857–64	Tate Britain, London	
	A Christmas Carol	1857-8	Fogg Museum of Art, Harvard University	
	Before the Battle	1858	Museum of Fine Arts, Boston	
	Golden Water or Princess Parisadé	1858	Fitzwilliam Museum, Cambridge	
	The Seed of David	1858–64	Llandaff Cathedral, Cardiff	
	The Bower Garden	1859	Dr. G. L. Leathart	
	My Lady Greensleeves	1859 (watercolour)	British Museum, London	
	Sir Galahad at the Ruined Chapel	1859	Birmingham Museum & Art Gallery	
	The Salutation of Beatrice or Salutatio Beatricis (left panel)	1859	National Gallery of Canada, Ottawa	
	The Salutation of Beatrice or Salutatio Beatricis (right panel)	1859	National Gallery of Canada, Ottawa	

== 1860s ==
Image	Name	Year	Current Location	Ref
	Dantis Amor	1860	Tate Britain, London	
	Bocca Baciata	1860	Museum of Fine Arts, Boston	
	The Farmer's Daughter or Hanging the Mistletoe or Girl Tying Up Mistletoe	1860	private collection	
	Lucrezia Borgia	1860–61	Tate Britain, London	
	Regina Cordium	1860	Johannesburg Art Gallery	
	Regina Cordium	1861	Mrs. L. D. Jackson	
	Algernon Charles Swinburne	1861 (watercolour)	Fitzwilliam Museum, Cambridge	
	The Annunciation	1861 (watercolour)	Fitzwilliam Museum, Cambridge	
	Fair Rosamund	1861	National Museum of Wales, Cardiff	
	Love's Greeting	c.1861	Isabella Stewart Gardner Museum, Boston	
	St. George and the Princess Sabra	1862	Tate Britain, London	
	The Story of St. George and the Dragon: The Princess Sabra Drawing the Lot	1861–62, 1868	Birmingham Museum & Art Gallery	
	Girl at a Lattice	1862	Fitzwilliam Museum, Cambridge	
	Mrs. James Leathart	1862	Mrs. T.H. Leathart	
	Belcolore	1863	Museum of Fine Arts, Boston	
	Woman in Yellow	1863 (watercolour)	Tate Britain, London	
	Helen of Troy	1863	Kunsthalle, Hamburg	
	Joan of Arc Kissing the Sword of Deliverance	1863	Musée des Beaux-Arts de Strasbourg	
	Fazio's Mistress or Aurelia	1863;1873	Tate Britain, London	
	La Castagnetta or The dancing girl or The daughter of Herodias	1863	Jerrold N. Moore	
	My Lady Greensleeves	1863	Fogg Museum of Art, Harvard University	
	Beata Beatrix	1864	Tate Britain, London	
	How Sir Galahad, Sir Bors and Sir Percival were Fed with the Sanc Grael; But Sir Percival's Sister Died by the Way	1864 (watercolour)	Tate Britain, London	
	Emily Heimann	1864	private collection	
	Monna Pomona	1864	Tate Britain, London	
	Morning Music	1864 (watercolour)	Fitzwilliam Museum, Cambridge (See also 1867 version in Birmingham)	
	Venus Verticordia	1864–68	Russell-Cotes Art Gallery & Museum, Bournemouth	
	Woman Combing Her Hair	1864 (watercolour)	Virginia Surtees	
	The First Madness of Ophelia	1864 (watercolour)	Gallery Oldham	
	The Blue Bower	1865	The Barber Institute of Fine Arts, University of Birmingham	
	A Fight for a Woman	1865 (watercolour)	Detroit Institute of Arts	
	Il Ramoscello or Bella e Buona	1865	Fogg Museum of Art, Harvard University	
	The Merciless Lady	1865	Charles Handley–Read	
	Miss Burton	1865	The Honorable Colin Tennant	
	The Beloved or The Bride or The King's Daughter	1865–66, 1873	Tate Britain, London	
	Monna Vanna or Belcolore	1866	Tate Britain, London	
	Regina Cordium	1866	Kelvingrove Art Gallery and Museum, Glasgow	
	Sibylla Palmifera or Venus Palmifera	1866–70	Lady Lever Art Gallery, Port Sunlight	
	Morning Music	1867 (watercolour)	Birmingham Museum & Art Gallery	
	A Christmas Carol	1867	The Viscount Leverhulme	
	Joli Coeur	1867	Manchester Art Gallery	
	The Loving Cup	1867 (watercolour)	National Museum of Western Art, Tokyo	
	The Loving Cup	1867 (watercolour)	Art Gallery of South Australia	
	Sir Tristram and La Belle Yseult Drinking the Love Potion	1867	Cecil Higgins Art Gallery, Bedford, England	
	Lady Lilith	1867	Metropolitan Museum of Art, New York	
	Mrs. William Morris or The Blue Silk Dress	1868	Kelmscott Manor, Oxfordshire	
	Lady Lilith	1868	Delaware Art Museum, Wilmington	
	Pia de' Tolomei	c.1868	Spencer Museum of Art, Kansas	

== 1870s ==
Image	Name	Year	Current Location	Ref
	Mrs. William Morris	c.1870	Wightwick Manor, Wolverhampton, UK	
	Mariana	1870	Aberdeen Art Gallery, Scotland	
	Silence	1870	Brooklyn Museum of Art, New York	
	La Donna della Finestra	1870 (pastel)	Bradford Art Gallery, UK	
	Pandora	1871	private collection	
	Dante's Dream at the Time of the Death of Beatrice	1869–1871	Walker Art Gallery, Liverpool	
	Water Willow	1871	Delaware Art Museum, Wilmington, Delaware	
	The Bower Meadow	1872	Manchester Art Gallery	
	Veronica Veronese	1872	Delaware Art Museum, Wilmington, Delaware	
	Blanzifiore	1873	Collection of Andrew Lloyd Webber	
	La Ghirlandata	1873	Guildhall Art Gallery, London	
	Marigolds or Bower Maiden or Fleurs de Marie or Gardener's Daughter	1873	Nottingham Castle Museum and Art Gallery	
	Proserpine	1874	Tate Britain, London	
	Damsel of the Sanct Grael	1874	collection of Andrew Lloyd Webber	
	Roman Widow or Dîs Manibus	1874	Museo de Arte de Ponce, Puerto Rico	
	Sancta Lilias	1874	Tate Britain, London	
	La Bella Mano	1875	Delaware Art Museum, Wilmington, Delaware	
	The Death of Lady Macbeth'	1875 (pen and sepia wash)	Ashmolean Museum, Oxford, UK	
	Astarte Syriaca or Venus Astarte	1876–77	Manchester Art Gallery	
	Mnemosyne or Lamp of Memory or Ricordanza	1876–1881	Delaware Art Museum, Wilmington, Delaware	
	A Sea–Spell	1877	Fogg Museum of Art, Harvard University	
	Mary Magdalene	1877	Delaware Art Museum, Wilmington, Delaware	
	Bruna Brunelleschi	1878	Fitzwilliam Museum, Cambridge, UK	
	A Vision of Fiammetta	1878	Collection of Andrew Lloyd Webber	
	Pandora	1878 (chalks)	Lady Lever Art Gallery, Port Sunlight, UK	
	Beatrice	1879	Charles Butler	
	La Donna della Finestra or The Lady of Pity	1879	Fogg Museum of Art, Harvard University	

== 1880s ==
Image	Name	Year	Current Location	Ref
	The Day Dream or Monna Primavera	1880	Victoria and Albert Museum, London	
	The Blessed Damozel	1875–1881	Fogg Museum of Art, Harvard University	
	The Salutation of Beatrice	1880–81	Toledo Museum of Art, Ohio	
	Proserpine	1882	Birmingham Museums & Art Gallery, Birmingham, UK	

== See also ==
- List of Pre-Raphaelite paintings
