= The Blue Bower =

Painting by Dante Gabriel Rossetti

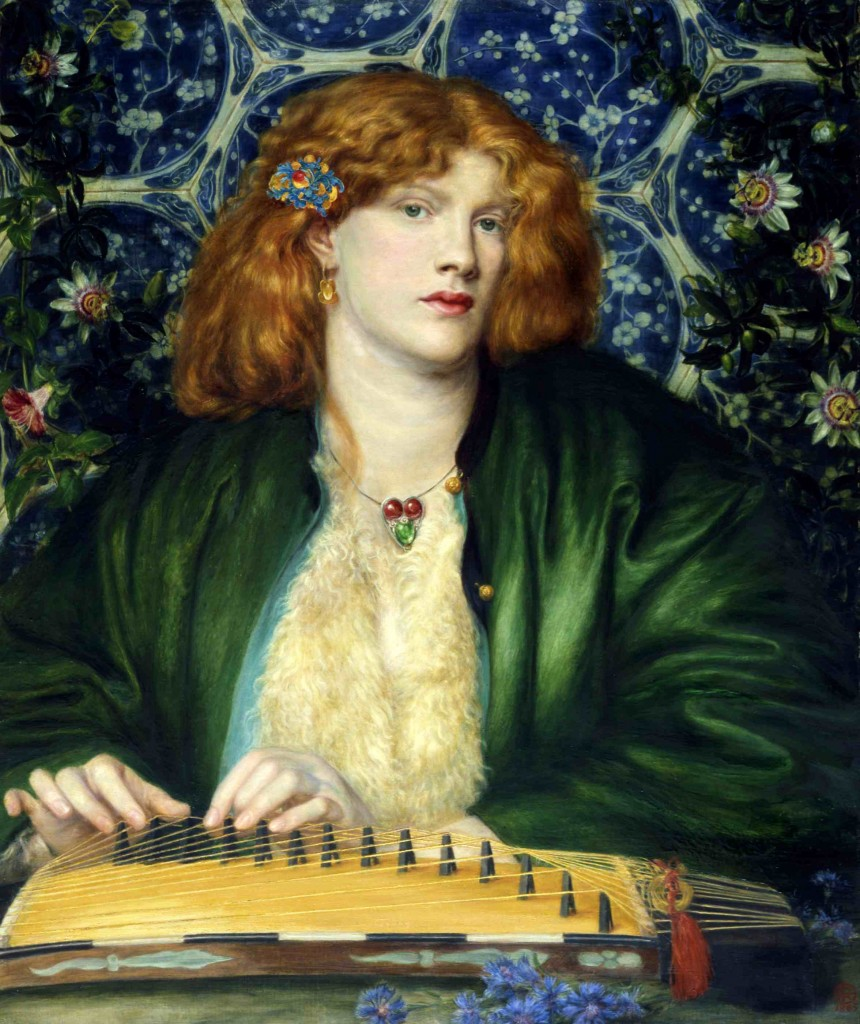
- Artist: Dante Gabriel Rossetti
- Year: 1865
- Type: Oil on canvas, portrait painting
- Dimensions: 84 cm × 70.9 cm (33 in × 27.9 in)
- Location: Barber Institute of Fine Arts, Birmingham

The Blue Bower is an 1865 oil painting by the British Pre-Raphaelite artist Dante Gabriel Rossetti. It effectively serves as a portrait of his frequent model and lover Fanny Cornforth. It is enhanced by a variety of objects including the cornflowers that make a play with her surname and a koto, a Japanese musical instrument. The title suggests that it depicts a bower, where romantic intrigues and meetings took place.

The picture was commissioned by the art dealer Ernest Gambart. The picture was displayed at the Royal Academy's Winter Exhibition of 1883 at Burlington House as part of a posthumous retrospective of Rossetti's works. Today the painting is in the collection of the Barber Institute of Fine Arts in Birmingham, which purchased it in 1959.

== See also ==
- List of paintings by Dante Gabriel Rossetti

== Bibliography ==
- Merrill, Linda. The Peacock Room: A Cultural Biography. Freer Gallery of Art, 1998.
- Prettejohn, Elizabeth. Art for Art's Sake: Aestheticism in Victorian Painting. Yale University Press, 2007.
- Spencer-Longhurst, Paul. The Blue Bower: Rossetti in the 1860s. Scala Publishers, 2000.
