= Monna Vanna (Rossetti) =

Painting by Dante Gabriel Rossetti

- Venus Veneta, Belcolore
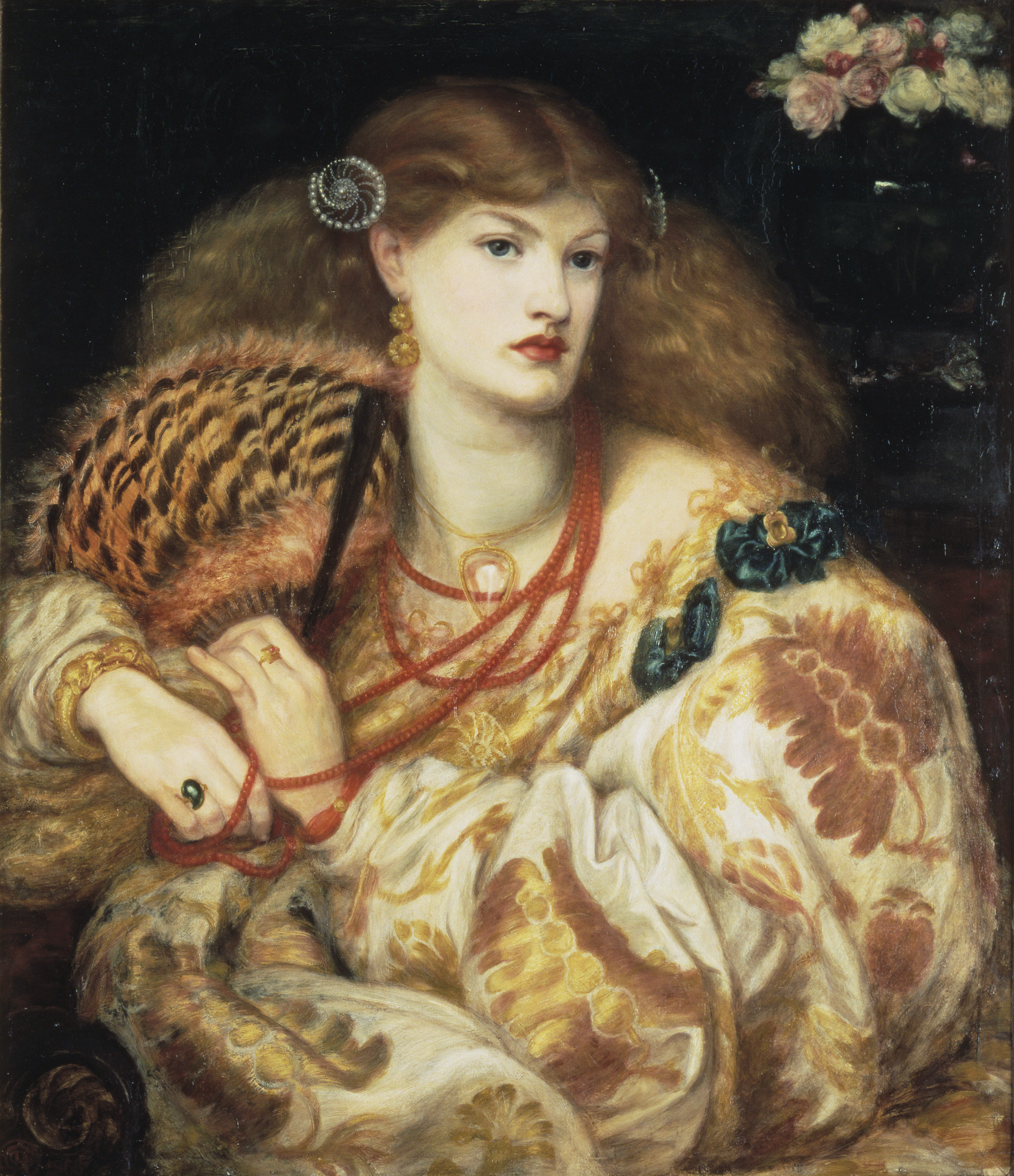
- Artist: Dante Gabriel Rossetti
- Year: 1866
- Medium: Oil on canvas
- Dimensions: 88.9 cm × 86.4 cm (35.0 in × 34.0 in)
- Location: Tate Britain, London
- Website: Tate Britain catalogue entry

Monna Vanna is an 1866 oil on canvas painting (88.9 × 86.4 cm) by Dante Gabriel Rossetti. It was acquired by the collector William Henry Blackmore and later entered the collection of George Rae, one of Rossetti's patrons. It later passed from Rae to the joint ownership of Arthur Du Cros and Otto Beit and it was purchased from them by the Tate Gallery in 1916 via the NACF – it is now in the collection of Tate Britain in London.

It shows a frontal half-length portrait of one of Rossetti's main models, Alexa Wilding, with her head turned to the right of the frame. She is shown with pale, luminous and delicate skin (fitting in with the aestheticism of the time) and a hard penetrating gaze. She holds a feather fan over her right shoulder as well wearing many kinds of jewellery, picked by the painter to show off his painterly skill – a red coral necklace, rings and earrings. In her hair are two spiral shell-shaped hairclips, accessories particularly loved by Rossetti and used here to emphasize the painting's circular composition. Rossetti's own opinion of the painting was that it was "probably the most effective as a room decoration that I have ever painted".

== Title ==
Its original title was Venus Veneta (Venetian Venus), making it a response to Renaissance and classical archetypes, particular those by Titian and other 16th century painters – in a letter dated 27 September 1866, Rossetti stated his aim in painting it was to produce "a Venetian lady in a rich dress of white and gold – in short the Venetian ideal of female beauty". After its completion he renamed it Monna Vanna (vain woman) to underline the vanity of life or more likely to emphasize the subject's Italian origins.

The new title derived from Monna Vanna ("Vain Woman"), a character in chapter XXIV of one of Rossetti's favourite books, La Vita Nuova (1294) by his namesake Dante Alighieri. The woman in question may refer to Giovanna, the beloved of the poet Guido Cavalcanti, who is heavily associated with images of springtime in Dante's work. The painter had translated the Vita into English in 1848 and it had intense personal significance to him, principally in its allusions to spring, referenced in this painting by the vase of flowers in the top right hand corner and the floral motifs on the woman's gold brocade robe. In 1873 Rossetti renamed it again, this time as Belcolore, since he now felt the other titles did not fully indicate the modernity of the subject, but this did not last and Monna Vanna is still the accepted title.

== See also ==
- List of paintings by Dante Gabriel Rossetti
