= Sight measure =

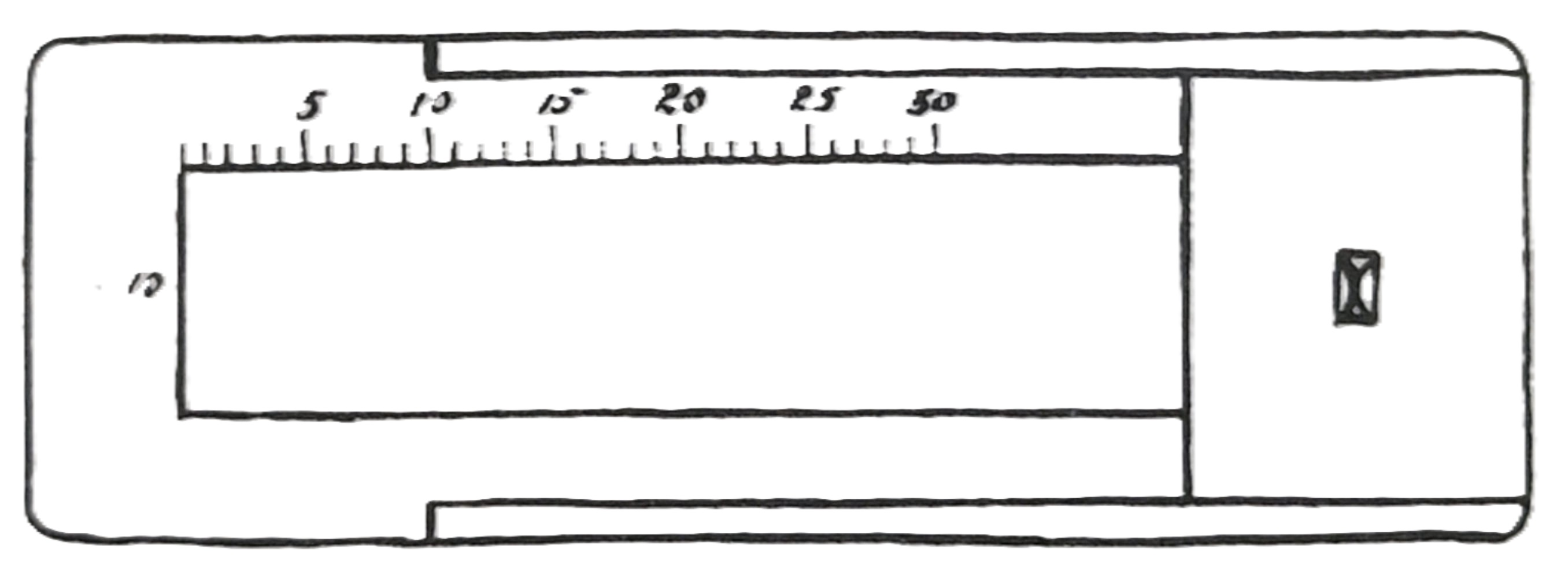
Sight measure (1889)

The sight measure is a device used in the past by painters to establish the proportions of the picture's canvas. It was made of the thin metal, usually painted black, with a rectangular opening and a sliding attachment that could cover part of the opening. Looking through the opening at the scene to be painted, the artist was able to select the proportions of the canvas so that it can fit the desired representation. The vertical side of the opening was assigned a size of 10 units, the horizontal side had a scale marked in increment of these units.

The device appeared in catalogs of painting supplies in the 19th century, yet never got widely popular. A simpler alternative was to use for the same purpose an opening cut into a piece of cardboard (called either a finder or a window).

== Of a painting ==
In a painting, the sight measure is the size of the area of canvas visible through the picture frame (the edges of the canvas are hidden by the rabbet). The full size of the canvas (on the stretcher bars, including the edges obscured by the frame) is called the rabbet measure.

== Sources ==
- Gettens, R. J.; Stout, G. L. (1966). "Sight Measure". Painting Materials: A Short Encyclopedia. Courier Corporation. p. 310. ISBN 978-0-486-14242-5. OCLC 868969354.
- Crussell, Edward H. (January 1910). "The Jobbing Carpenter and Some of His Work XI". The Building Age: 27–30.
