= Mnemosyne (Rossetti) =

Oil painting by Dante Gabriel Rossetti

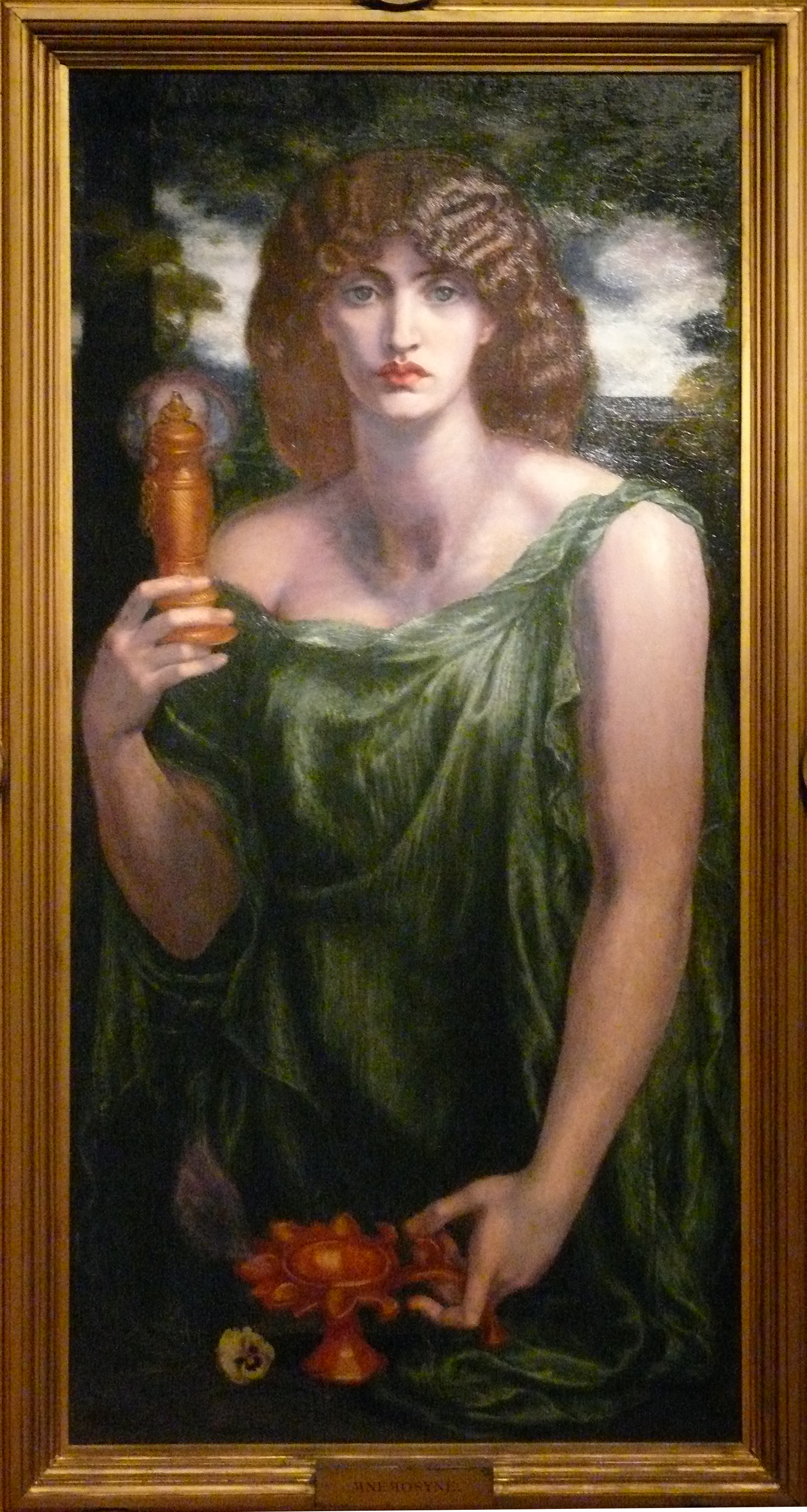
- Artist: Dante Gabriel Rossetti
- Year: 1875–1881
- Medium: Oil on canvas
- Dimensions: 126.4 cm × 61 cm (49.8 in × 24 in)
- Location: Delaware Art Museum, Wilmington, Delaware

Mnemosyne, also titled Lamp of Memory and Ricordanza, is an oil painting by Dante Gabriel Rossetti begun in 1875 or early 1876 and completed in 1881. Jane Morris was the model, and Frederick Richards Leyland bought the painting in 1881 and displayed it in his drawing room with five other Rossetti "stunners." At about the same time Rossetti, a founder of the Pre-Raphaelite Brotherhood, was painting Astarte Syriaca, a larger painting completed in 1877 with Morris in a very similar pose.

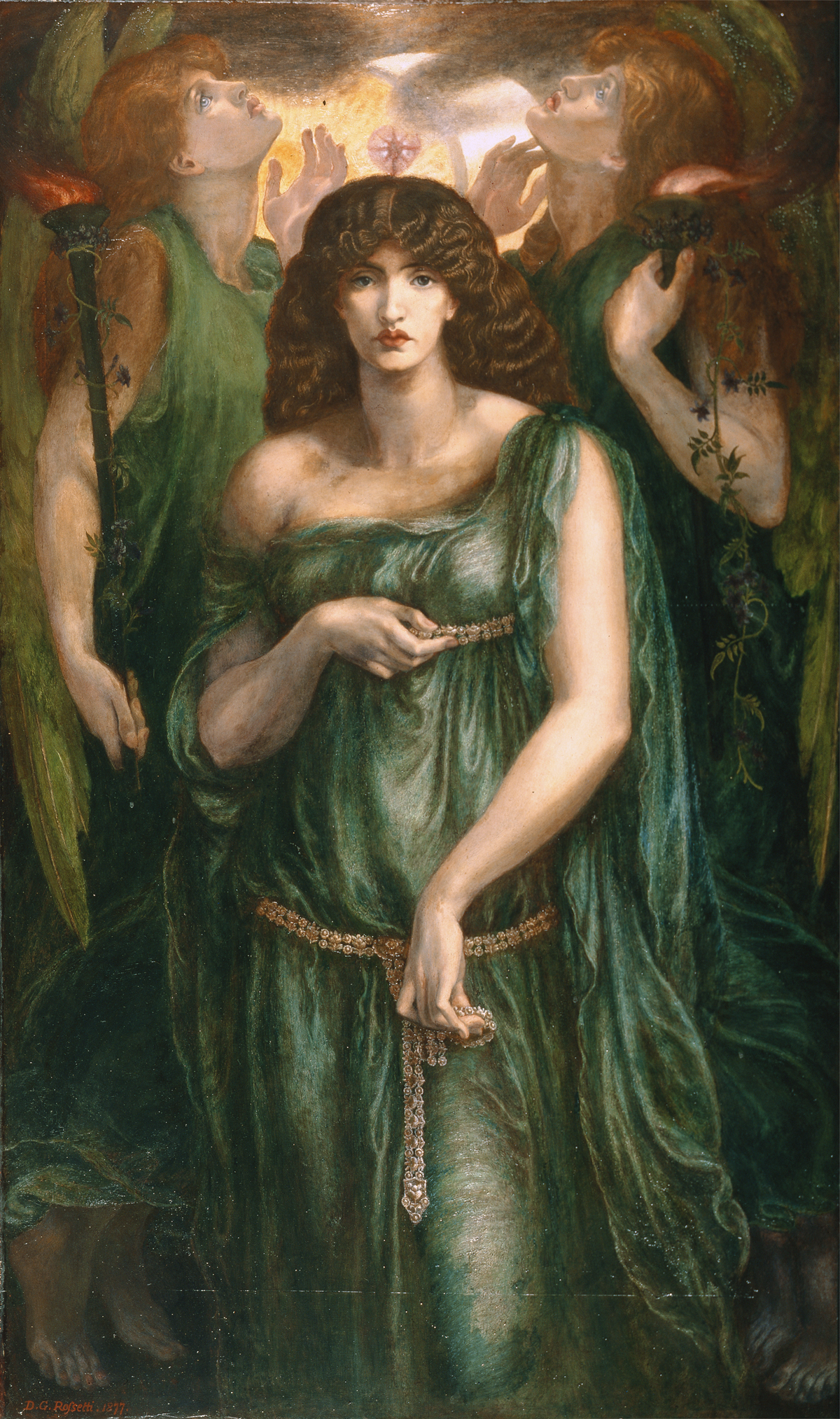
Astarte Syriaca in the Manchester Art Gallery

== Painting ==
Mnemosyne began as an oil study for Astarte Syriaca, for which Jane Morris sat over the winter of 1875–1876, but Rossetti later worked it up as an image of Mnemosyne, the Greek personification of Memory. Rossetti wrote to his mother about the two paintings on 29 April 1876:

"I have twice commenced the Venus Astarte subject. The second commencement is I believe quite a success for me—my best; and the heads are now all fully secured. I have lately been working up as a separate picture the principal head of the first commencement, which, though I was bent on doing it still better for the picture, is by no means a failure. I am making it into another design of head and hands only, to be called Memory, or La Ricordanza which word I suppose (though it might be rather obsolete) is as admissible Italian as 'Rimembranza'."

A month later Rossetti was considering ordering a frame for the painting and selling it to Clarence Fry. Fry declined and in July 1876 Leyland advanced Rossetti 300 pounds for the painting, although he was concerned that the painting was too large for his drawing room. Rossetti did further work on the painting in 1879 and adjusted the frame in 1880, before delivering it to Leyland in 1881. It was one of Rossetti's last completed canvases.

Inscribed on the picture's frame is:

Thou fill'st from the winged chalice of the soul
Thy lamp, O Memory, fire-winged to its goal.

== Provenance and exhibitions ==
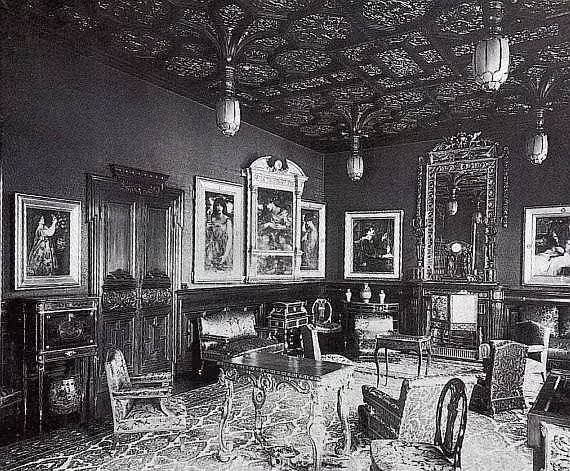
Six Rossetti paintings as hung in Leyland's drawing room, 1892. Mnemosyne hangs second from the left. (Click on any painting for its article.)

Frederick Richards Leyland bought the painting from Rossetti in 1881. It hung in Leyland's drawing room with five other Rossetti paintings that Leyland called "stunners." The painting was sold at Leyland's estate sale, held at Christie's on 28 May 1892 to William Connal McLean and changed hands in two gallery sales in 1908. It was purchased in 1916 by the estate of Samuel Bancroft who had acquired one of the largest collections of Pre-Raphaelite art outside of the United Kingdom. The Bancroft estate donated its extensive collection of paintings in 1935 to the Delaware Art Museum.

The painting was exhibited in London in 1883, Glasgow in 1893, and London in 1906. It has also been exhibited in New Haven, Connecticut (1976) and Richmond, Virginia (1982)

== See also ==
- List of paintings by Dante Gabriel Rossetti

== Sources ==
- Marsh, Jan (1994). Pre-Raphaelite Women: Images of femininity in Pre-Raphaelite art. London: Artus Books. ISBN 1-898799-33-4.
- Wildman, Stephen; Laurel Bradley; Deborah Cherry; John Christian; David B. Elliott; Betty Elzea; Margaretta Fredrick; Caroline Hannah; Jan Marsh; Gayle Seymour (2004). Waking Dreams, the Art of the Pre-Raphaelites from the Delaware Art Museum. Art Services International. p. 395.
