= The Girlhood of Mary Virgin =

Painting by Dante Gabriel Rossetti

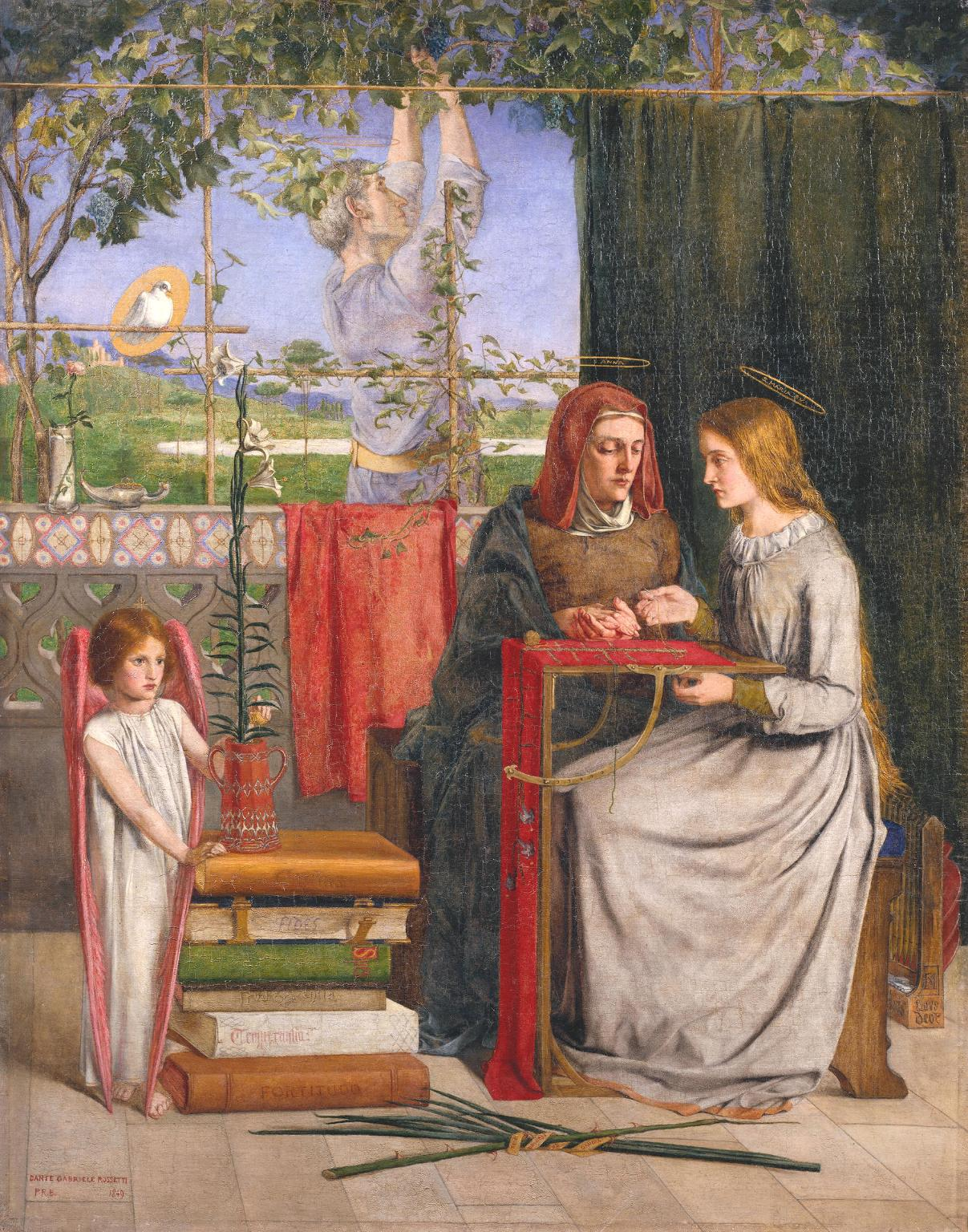
- Artist: Dante Gabriel Rossetti
- Year: 1849
- Medium: Oil on canvas
- Dimensions: 83.2 cm × 65.4 cm (32.8 in × 25.7 in)
- Location: Tate Britain, London
- Website: Tate Britain - catalogue entry

The Girlhood of Mary Virgin is an 1849 oil painting by the Pre-Raphaelite Brotherhood painter Dante Gabriel Rossetti, measuring 83.2 by 65.4 cm and now in the collection of Tate Britain, to which it was bequeathed in 1937 by Agnes Jekyll. It was his first completed oil painting and is signed "Dante Gabriele Rossetti P.R.B. 1849". He first exhibited it at the 'Free Exhibition' at the Hyde Park Corner Gallery.

== History ==
Rossetti began the work in summer 1848, working hard and aiming to have it completed for exhibition in March 1849. In November 1848 he mentioned his choice of subject in a letter to his father's friend, Charles Lyell of Kinnordy, stating that it would definitely appeal to members of a religious community. It was a common subject in medieval and renaissance art and usually shows Mary with a book on her lap as her mother, Anne, teaches her to read. But instead Rossetti shows Mary embroidering a lily (traditional symbol of Mary's purity) under Anne's guidance while her father, Joachim, prunes a vine in the background, referring to the coming of Christ (who calls himself "the True Vine" in John 15.1). The vine is shaped like a cross, prefiguring Christ’s passion.

Rossetti made several preliminary studies in chalk and the Scottish poet and artist William Bell Scott saw the work in progress in Hunt's studio and remarked on young Rossetti's technique:

He was painting in oils with water-colour brushes, as thinly as in water-colour, on canvas which he had primed with white till the surface was a smooth as cardboard, and every tint remained transparent. I saw at once that he was not an orthodox boy, but acting purely from the aesthetic motive. The mixture of genius and dilettantism of both men shut me up for the moment, and whetted my curiosity.

The models were sourced from close to home — Anne was portrayed by Rossetti's mother Frances, his sister Christina Rossetti modelled for Mary, and the family servant Williams for Joachim. The angel's face was originally based on the half-sister of Thomas Woolner (1825-1892), but in August 1849 Rossetti replaced her features with those of another girl, recommended to him by his fellow Pre-Raphaelite James Collinson (1825-1881).

Rossetti wrote two sonnets to explain the painting's symbolism — the first was engraved at the bottom of the original frame, whilst the second was printed in the Free Exhibition catalogue. A crossed palm branch on the floor refers to Palm Sunday and Good Friday and the pale roses and thorn-shaped branches on the wall to Christ's passion and Mary's seven joys and seven sorrows. The oil lamp symbolises piety, three of the books are in colours symbolising the three cardinal virtues and the rose is another symbol of Mary (the 'rose without a thorn'). The Annunciation is prefigured by a dove, symbolising the Holy Spirit.

It received a generally good reception and reviews at the Free Exhibition. It was bought for £80 by Louisa, marchioness of Bath, wife of John Thynne, 4th Marquess of Bath and a family friend of the Rossettis. Rossetti repainted Mary's dress and the angel's face before sending the work to her, whilst the payment for it funded a trip to Belgium and France by him and William Holman Hunt. It was exhibited again in 1850 in the Portland Gallery Exhibitions at the Royal Academy, where it received a less friendly reception. By 1864 it was owned by Lady Louise Fielding, who that year sent it back to Rossetti for repainting — he turned the angel's wings from white to deep pink and Mary's sleeves from yellow to brown. The original frame with its rounded upper corners was also replaced by a rectangular frame with both of Rossetti's sonnets on its base.

== See also ==
- List of paintings by Dante Gabriel Rossetti

== Bibliography ==
- Prettejohn, Elizabeth, The Art of the Pre-Raphaelites, 2007, Tate Publishing, Millbank, London. ISBN 9781854377265 ISBN 978-1854377265
- Donnelly, Brian, Sonnet-Image-Intertext: Reading Rossetti's the Girlhood of Mary Virgin and Found, article in Victorian Poetry, Vol. 48, No. 4
