= Jane Morris (disambiguation) =

Jane Morris (1839–1914) was an English embroiderer.

Jane Morris can also refer to:

- Jane Alice Morris (1861–1935), an English embroiderer, daughter of Jane Morris
- Jane Morris-Goodall (1934–2025), English primatologist and anthropologist
- Jane Morris (judoka) (born 1969), English judoka
- Jane Morris, actress in 1991 American film Frankie & Johnny (1991 film)

== See also ==
- Jan Morris (1926–2020), Welsh writer
