= The Day Dream (Rossetti) =

Painting by Dante Gabriel Rossetti

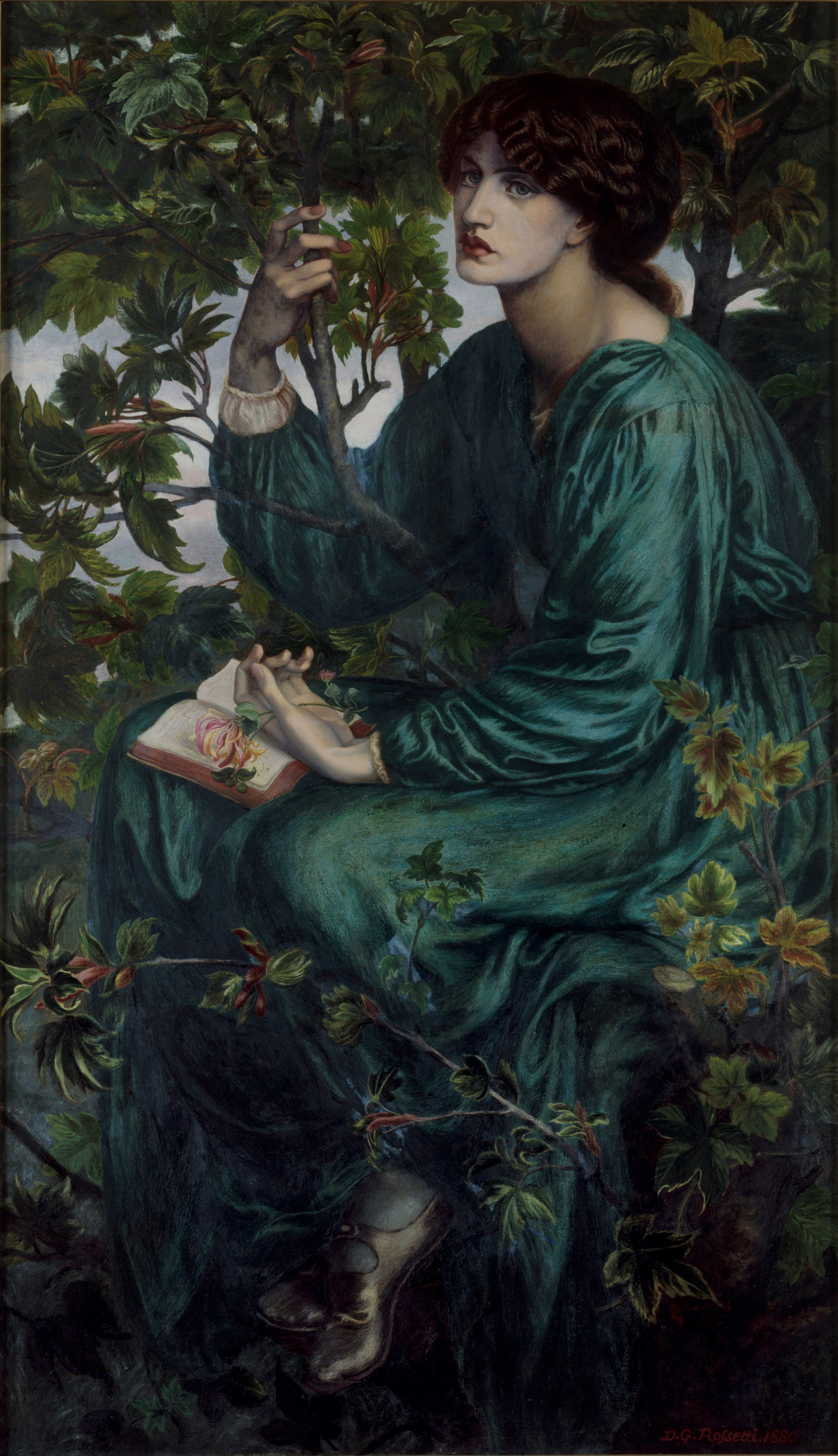
- Artist: Dante Gabriel Rossetti
- Year: 1880
- Medium: Oil on canvas
- Dimensions: 158.7 cm × 92.7 cm (62.5 in × 36.5 in)
- Location: Victoria and Albert Museum

The Day Dream or, as it was initially intended to be named, Monna Primavera, is an oil-on-canvas painting by the Pre-Raphaelite Brotherhood founder member Dante Gabriel Rossetti. The work, which measures 158.7 centimetres (62.5 in) high by 92.7 centimetres (36.5 in) wide, was undertaken in 1880 and depicts Jane Morris in a seated position on the bough of a sycamore tree. In her hand is a small stem of honeysuckle – a token of love in the Victorian era – that may be an indication of the secret affair the artist was immersed in with her at the time. The artwork was left to the Victoria and Albert Museum by Constantine Alexander Ionides in 1900.

== Background ==
During 1878 Rossetti completed a chalk sketch of Morris, his secret lover, whom he had met at the Theatre Royal, Drury Lane, in 1857. She was the model for several of his well-known paintings, including Proserpine. The drawing was displayed above the mantlepiece in Rossetti's studio. Initially the painting was to be called Monna Primavera, or Vanna Primavera, possibly inspired by La Vita Nuova, a narrative that captivated Rossetti and was the basis for earlier of his works of art. Rossetti was also a poet and penned sonnets to accompany several of his paintings; the last composition in his series entitled Sonnets for Pictures is associated with this painting. The sonnet reads:

The thronged boughs of the shadowy sycamore
Still bear young leaflets half the summer through;
From when the robin 'gainst the unhidden blue
Perched dark, till now, deep in the leafy core,
The embowered throstle's urgent wood-notes soar
Through summer silence. Still the leaves come new;
Yet never rosy-sheathed as those which drew
Their spiral tongues from spring-buds heretofore.

Within the branching shade of Reverie
Dreams even may spring till autumn; yet none be
Like woman's budding day-dream spirit-fann'd.
Lo! tow'rd deep skies, not deeper than her look,
She dreams; till now on her forgotten book
Drops the forgotten blossom from her hand.

Rossetti was not initially fully satisfied with the painting and he made several revisions to it. He wrote to Morris apologising for copying the feet of another woman into the picture. An earlier painting of Morris, entitled The Salutation of Beatrice, had similarly used a different model's hands in the final version.

== Description ==
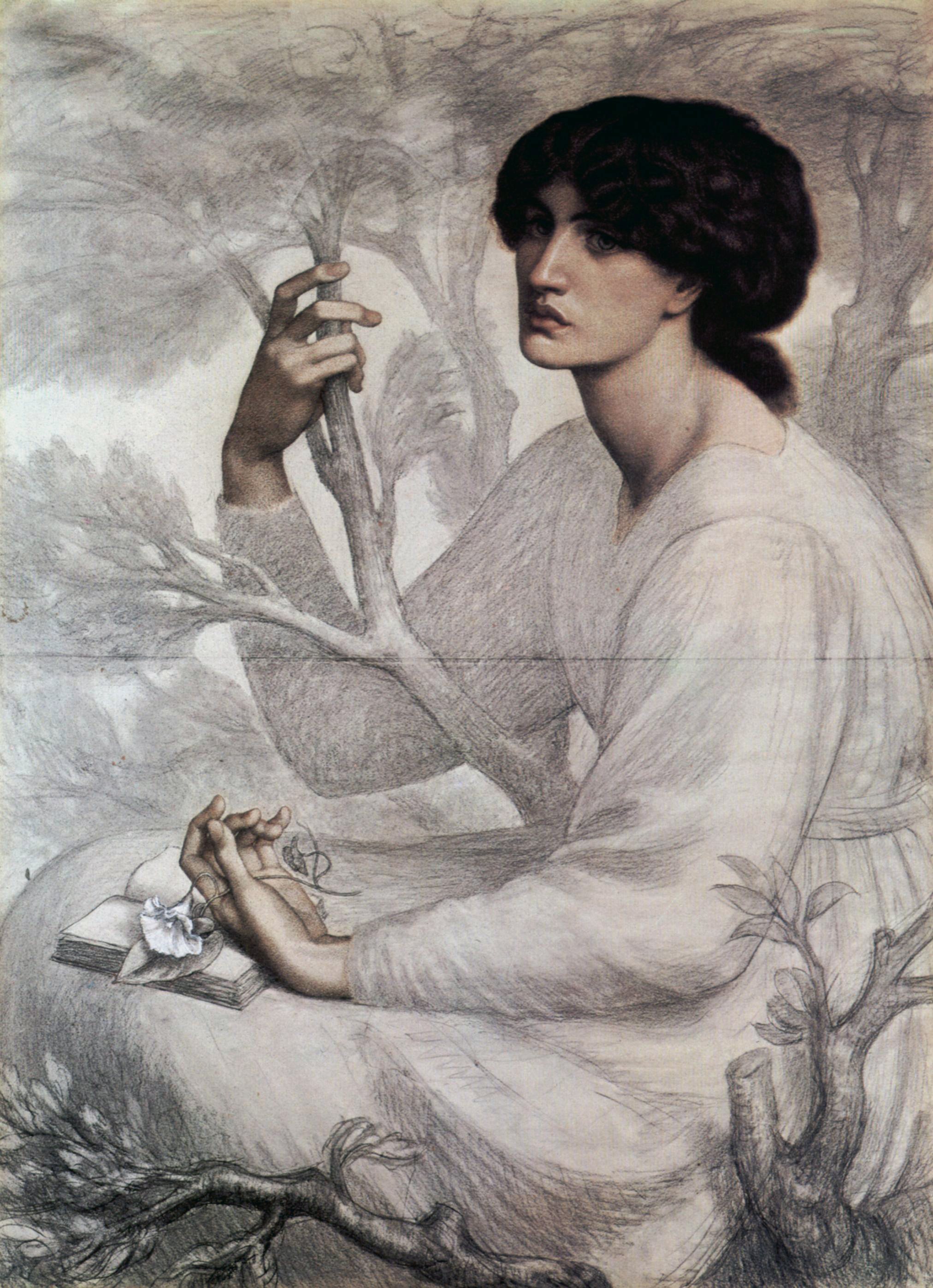
The chalk sketch that The Day Dream was based on is held by the Ashmolean Museum in Oxford.

Morris is in a seated position on the bough of a sycamore tree. In her hand is a small stem of honeysuckle – a token of love in the Victorian era – that may be an indication of the secret affair the artist was immersed in with her at the time. Unusually for Rossetti work during this time – this is one of his last paintings – the model is pictured full length. The painting is signed "D. Rossetti 1880" on the lower right.

The scene is a representation of a young woman shaded by the sycamore tree's leaves. Above her head and around her the tree branches are depicted almost embracing her, or as if she was emerging from the tree itself, almost as a dryad, or tree nymph. She is portrayed clad all in green, her silk dress is a romantic wide and loose silk robe, flowing in graceful folds down, blending in with the tree's leaves, in a way that connects the subject and her surroundings visually. She is immersed in her daydreams, turning her gaze downwards, away from the viewer, towards something unseen or perhaps only perceived by her. The depiction of the young, elegant woman in her shelter surrounded by the branches, adds to the secretive feeling of the painting, maybe indicating the furtiveness of the affair or a clandestine meeting place. In the shelter it is dark, but around her shoulder there is light, light blue compartments against a dark green background, signalling that it is daytime.

== Exhibitions and provenance ==
It was left to the Victoria and Albert Museum by Constantine Alexander Ionides in 1900. Ionides had commissioned Rossetti to undertake the work in 1879 for seven hundred guineas. Rossetti and Ionides corresponded throughout the duration of the work on the painting; when it was almost completed on 18 March 1880 Rossetti wrote saying: "[it] will be beyond question as good a thing as I ever did." He also gave explicit instructions as to where the picture was to be positioned, including details as to the height from the floor and the direction from which the light should hit it.

== See also ==
- List of paintings by Dante Gabriel Rossetti
