= Elizabeth Burden =

English embroiderer and teacher

- Born: 13 December 1841; Oxford, England
- Died: 22 August 1924 (aged 82); Reigate, Surrey, England
- Occupations: Embroiderer, teacher
- Known for: Arts and Crafts Movement and embroidery
- Relatives: Jane Morris (sister); William Morris (brother-in-law); May Morris (niece); Jane Alice Morris (niece)

Elizabeth (Bessie) Burden (13 December 1841 – 22 August 1924) was a British embroiderer and teacher. She was a member of the Arts and Crafts Movement, and worked for the embroidery department of Morris, Marshall, Faulkner & Co. She was the sister of Jane Morris and sister-in-law of the artist, designer and poet, William Morris.

== Biography ==
Elizabeth Burden was born in Oxford on 13 December 1841 in Oxford, at Brazier Passage, Holywell. She was baptised on 24 April 1842 in the local St Peter-in-the-East church. She was the youngest child of Robert and Anne Burden; her siblings were Mary Ann, William and Jane. Burden and her sister Jane are briefly mentioned in Reminiscences of Oxford (1908) by William Tuckwell. As a boy, Tuckwell lived opposite the Burden family's cottage, and later occupied a residence next door to the stables where Robert Burden worked.

In October 1857, Burden and Jane attended a performance of the Drury Lane Theatre Company in Oxford. Jane was noticed by Dante Gabriel Rossetti and Edward Burne-Jones, who were members of a group of artists painting the Oxford Union murals, based on Arthurian tales. Struck by her beauty, they asked her to model for them. She sat mostly for Rossetti as a model for Queen Guinevere and afterwards for William Morris, whom she would later marry in 1859.

Jane and William moved to Red House, Bexleyheath in 1860 and began decorating the house in the medieval style. Morris designed a set of 12 large embroideries (referred to as tapestries) based on The Legend of Good Women, by Geoffrey Chaucer. Seven of these panels were completed, mainly embroidered by Jane, with help from Burden. The figure of 'St Catherine', entirely embroidered by Burden, is now in the collection of The Society of Antiquaries: Kelmscott Manor collections and 'Aphrodite', also by Burden, in the collection of The National Trust: Red House. In 1865, a few months before the Morris family left Red House, Robert Burden died and Burden moved in with her sister and brother-in-law.

Burden's artistic abilities appear to have extended beyond embroidery; she cut the woodblock for 'Cupid Going Away', one of a series of illustrations to 'The Story of Cupid and Psyche' for the projected edition of William Morris's 'The Earthly Paradise'. The illustrations were engraved on wood by Morris and his friends and associates in the Firm. The project was abandoned in 1868 after trial pages printed at the Chiswick Press did not prove satisfactory. However surviving sets exist in the collections of the William Morris Gallery, the Morgan Library & Museum and the Fitzwilliam Museum.

By 1871, Burden was living with Jane and William at No. 26 Queen Square, London and working as an embroiderer for William's firm Morris, Marshall, Faulkner & Co. William Morris's surviving letters reveals his frustration with living with his sister-in-law. Writing to his friend Aglaia Coronio in November 1872, he complained:

"I have been a good deal in the house here - not alone, that would have been pretty well - but alone with poor Bessy [sic]: I must say it is a shame, she is quite harmless and even good, and one ought not to be irritated by her - but O my God what I have suffered from finding always there at meals & the like! poor soul 'tis only because she is an accidental person with whom I have nothing whatever to do..."

In early 1873, Burden took up a position teaching embroidery at the Royal School of Needlework (RSN), around the same time she moved to 100 Southampton Row, Russell Square, London. She only taught at the RSN for a couple of months before she left, having fallen out with head of the school, Mrs Welby, over a misunderstanding regarding the exhibiting of a student's work under Burden's name. Burden later returned to the RSN in April 1875, remaining there until 1877. In her role as teacher, she popularized a type of tapestry stitch that could be used to great effect for embroidery figures. The stitch was renamed ‘Burden Stitch’ in the School’s Handbook of Embroidery (1880) in recognition of her contribution; a woodcut showing the stitch was also included in the volume on the grounds that the RSN was frequently asked to describe it.

At the first exhibition of the newly formed Arts and Crafts Exhibition Society in 1888, Burden exhibited three embroidered figures worked in silk and worsted: 'Helen of Troy', 'Hippolite' and 'Penelope'.

Some time after 1901, Burden moved to Redhill, Surrey, where she found a position at Boldrewood, a school for young ladies, most probably giving needlework instruction. She died in Reigate, Surrey, in 1924.
