= Pia de' Tolomei (Rossetti) =

1868 painting by Dante Gabriel Rossetti

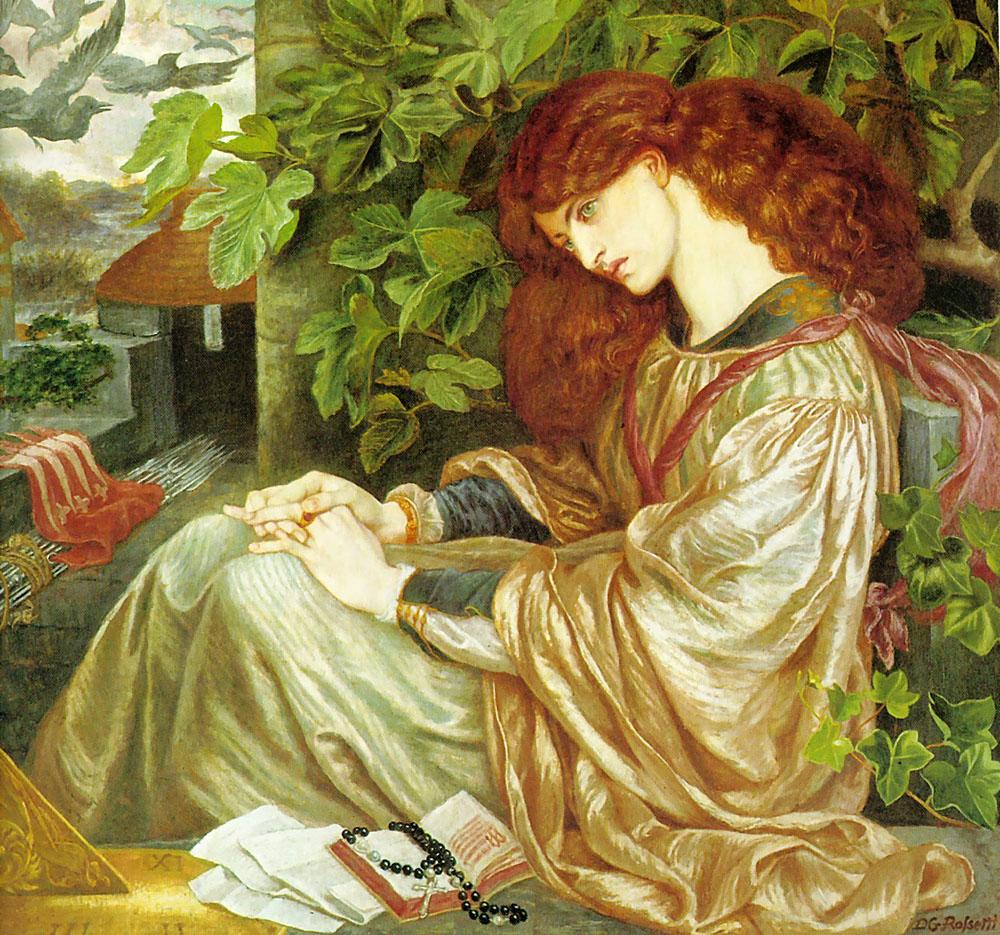
- Artist: Dante Gabriel Rossetti
- Year: c. 1868
- Medium: Oil on canvas
- Dimensions: 105.4 cm × 120.6 cm (41.5 in × 47.5 in)
- Location: Spencer Museum of Art, Lawrence

Pia de' Tolomei is an oil painting on canvas by English artist Dante Gabriel Rossetti, painted around 1868 and now in the Spencer Museum of Art, on the campus of the University of Kansas in Lawrence, Kansas.

== History ==
This work was painted at the start of Rossetti's affair with Jane Morris, who modelled for the picture. As he was to do with Beata Beatrix (1870), Rossetti chose a tale by Dante Aligheri (from Purgatorio) to illustrate his love for his model. The story tells of a woman whose husband imprisoned and later poisoned her: Rossetti wanted the world to believe the fantasy with which he was deluding himself – that William Morris kept Jane against her will. He continued this theme, as shown in Proserpine.

Rossetti not only drew Jane exhaustively, he also choreographed photographic sessions of her and used the photographs as preliminary sketches for drawings. Amongst other representations of her, Rossetti depicts Jane as Proserpine, Queen Guinevere and Desdemona – all of whom were at the mercy of men.

Jane appears disproportionately large in most of Rossetti's pictures. The background is immaterial as long as the viewer focuses on the beauty of her face. In Pia de' Tolomei her elongated neck seems almost dislocated, and the whiteness of her skin shines out, defying the viewer to pay attention to any other aspects of the painting. Morris's hair colour is misrepresented in the painting. Her natural colour was dark brown, yet Rossetti paints it with an auburn tinge – closer to Lizzie Siddal's hair colour than Morris's. Also, her hands are twisted and intertwined in a peculiar way.

== Gallery ==
Other depictions of Jane Morris

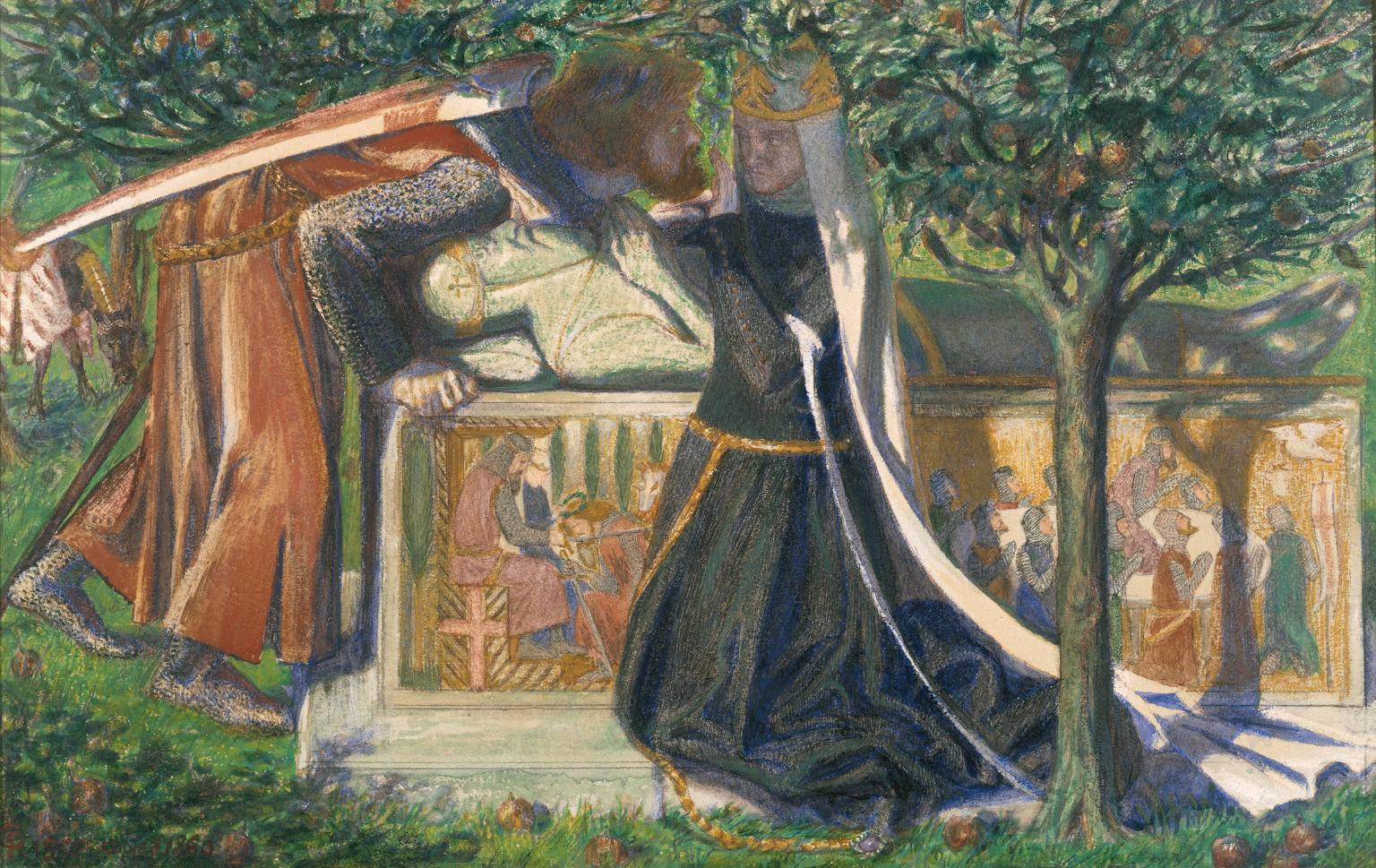
Arthur's Tomb (1854)

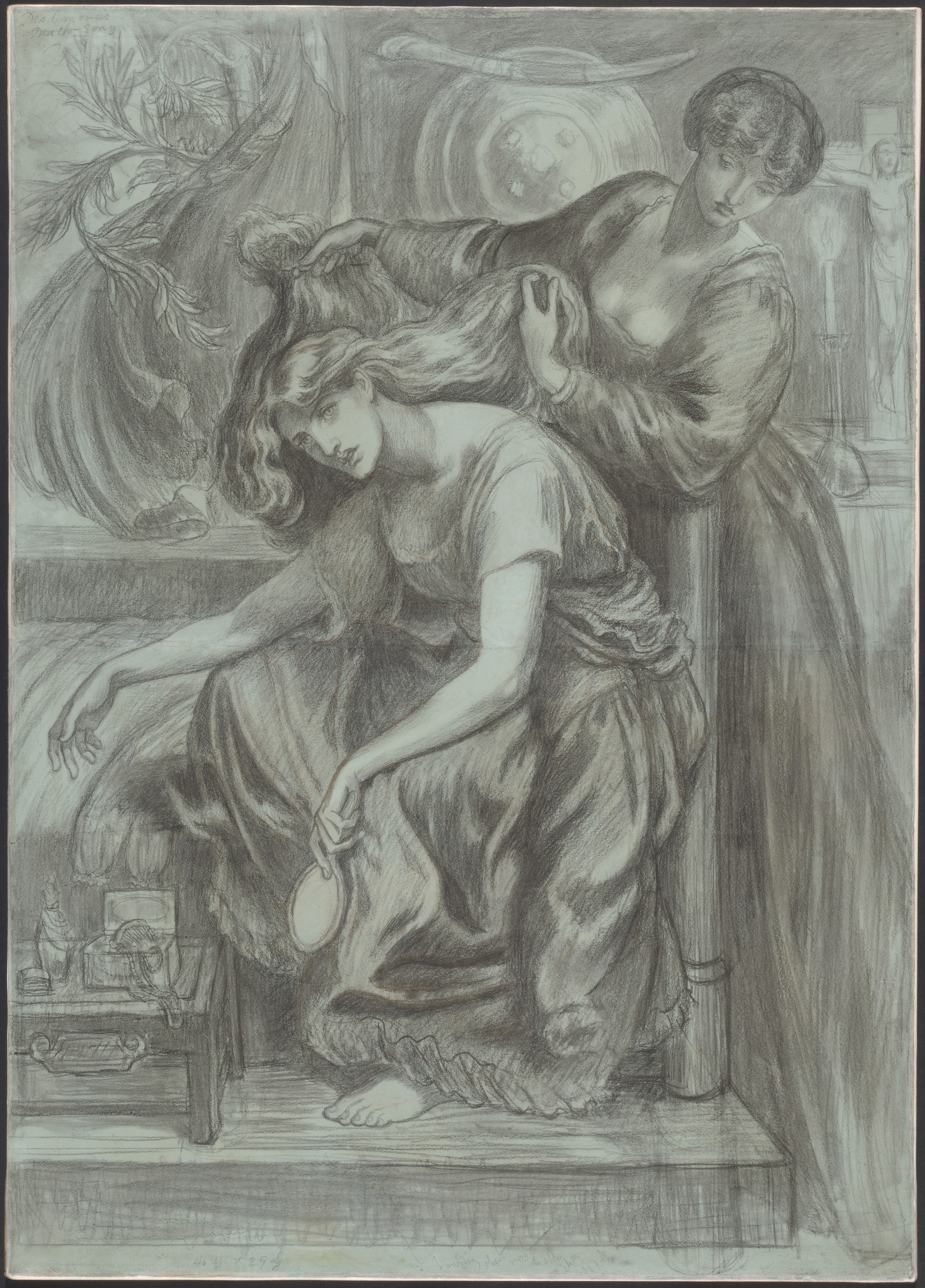
Desdemona's Death Song (c. 1878–1881)

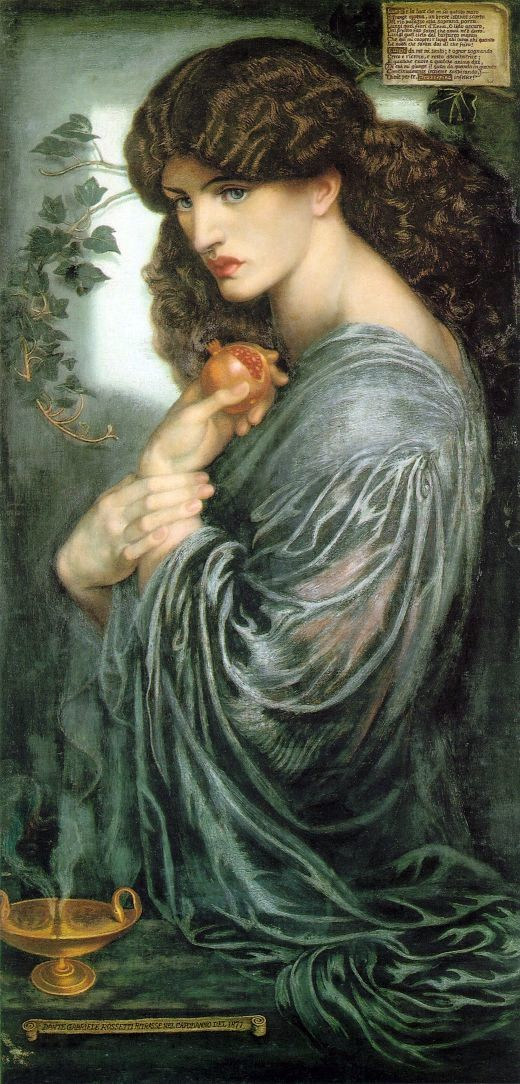
Proserpine (1874)

== See also ==
- Jane Morris, the artist's model
- List of paintings by Dante Gabriel Rossetti
- Rossetti and His Circle by Max Beerbohm, 1922
