= Jane Morris =

English embroiderer and artists' model (1839–1914)

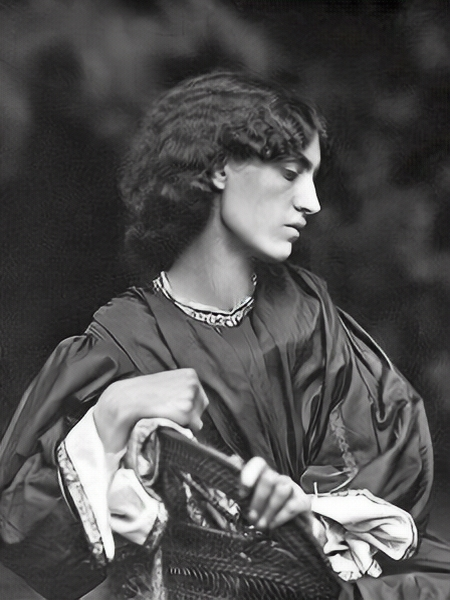
- Jane Morris, 1865
- Born: Jane Burden; 19 October 1839; Oxford, England
- Died: 26 January 1914 (aged 74); Bath, England
- Occupations: Embroiderer, artist's model
- Known for: Embroidery and Pre-Raphaelites
- Spouse: William Morris (m. 1859; died 1896)
- Children: Jenny Morris; May Morris
- Relatives: Elizabeth Burden (sister)

Jane Morris (née Burden; 19 October 1839 – 26 January 1914) was an English embroiderer in the Arts and Crafts movement and an artists' model who embodied the Pre-Raphaelite ideal of beauty. She was a model and muse to her husband William Morris and to Dante Gabriel Rossetti. Her sister was the embroiderer and teacher Elizabeth Burden.

== Life ==
Jane Burden was born in Oxford, the daughter of a stableman, Robert Burden, and his wife Ann Maizey, who was a domestic servant or a laundress. At the time of her birth, her parents were living at St Helen's Passage, in the parish of St Peter-in-the-East, off Holywell Street in Oxford which has since been marked with a blue plaque. Her mother Ann was illiterate and probably came to Oxford as a domestic servant. Little is known of Jane Burden's childhood, but it was certainly poor.

In October 1857, Burden and her sister Elizabeth, known as Bessie, attended a performance of the Drury Lane Theatre Company in Oxford. Jane Burden was noticed by Dante Gabriel Rossetti and Edward Burne-Jones who were members of a group of artists painting the Oxford Union murals, based on Arthurian tales. Struck by her beauty, they asked her to model for them. Burden sat mostly for Rossetti as a model for Queen Guinevere and afterwards for William Morris, who was working on an easel painting, La Belle Iseult, now in the Tate Gallery. During this period, Morris fell in love with Burden and they became engaged, though reportedly she was not in love with Morris.

She became a skilled needlewoman, self-taught in ancient embroidery techniques, and later became renowned for her own embroideries.

Jane married William Morris at St Michael at the Northgate in Oxford on 26 April 1859. After the marriage, the Morrises moved to the quasi-medieval Red House in Bexleyheath, Kent. While living there, they had two daughters, Jane Alice "Jenny," born 17 January 1861, and Mary "May" born 25 March 1862, who later edited her father's works. They moved to 26 Queen Square in London, which they shared with the design firm of Morris, Marshall, Faulkner & Co., and later bought Kelmscott House in Hammersmith as their main residence. Although Jane, her daughters Jenny and May, and her sister Bessie all supervised and embroidered for Morris & Co., credit for the designs were given to William Morris himself "in the interests of commercial success." The three embroidered panels depicting the illustrious women of Chaucer and Tennyson's writing now at Castle Howard were produced by Jane and Bessie in the 1880s.

In 1871, William Morris and Rossetti took out a joint tenancy on Kelmscott Manor on the Gloucestershire–Oxfordshire–Wiltshire borders. William Morris went to Iceland, leaving his wife and Rossetti to furnish the house and spend the summer there. Jane Morris had become closely attached to Rossetti and became a favourite muse of his. Their romantic relationship is reputed to have started in the late 1860s and lasted, on differing levels, until his death in 1882. They shared a deep emotional connection, and she inspired Rossetti to write poetry and create some of his best paintings. Her discovery of his dependence on chloral hydrate, which was taken for insomnia, eventually led her to distance herself from him, although they stayed in touch until he died in 1882.

In 1883, Jane Morris met the poet and political activist Wilfrid Scawen Blunt at a house party given by her close friend, Rosalind Howard (later Countess of Carlisle). There appears to have been an immediate attraction between them. By 1887 at the latest, they had become lovers. Their sexual relationship continued until 1894 and they remained close friends until her death.

A few months before her death, she bought Kelmscott Manor to secure it for her daughters' future. However, she did not return to the house after having purchased it. Jane Morris died on 26 January 1914, while staying at 5 Brock Street in Bath. She is buried in the churchyard of St. George's Church in Kelmscott.

== Gallery ==
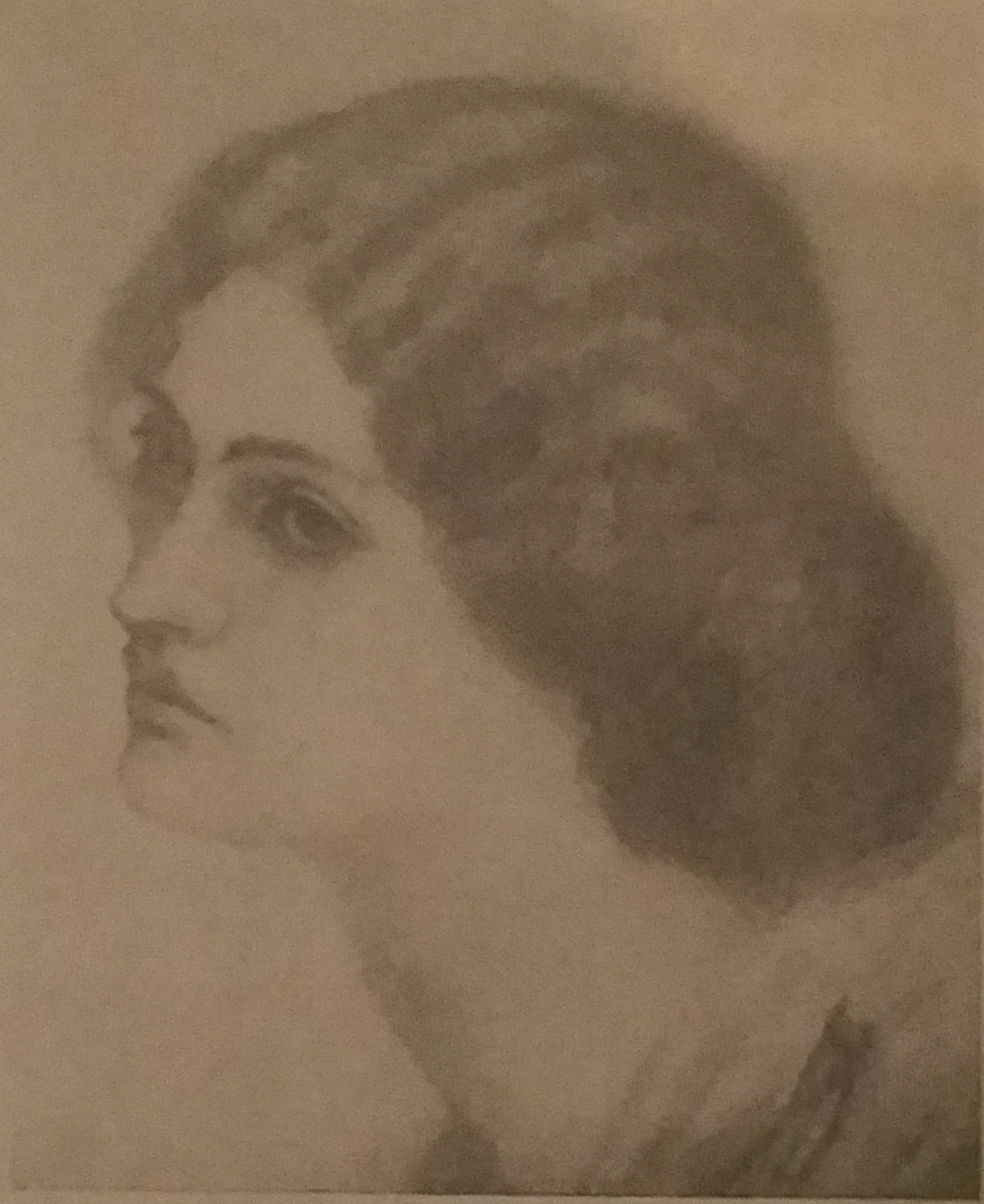
Jane sketched by William Morris at age 18, during their engagement

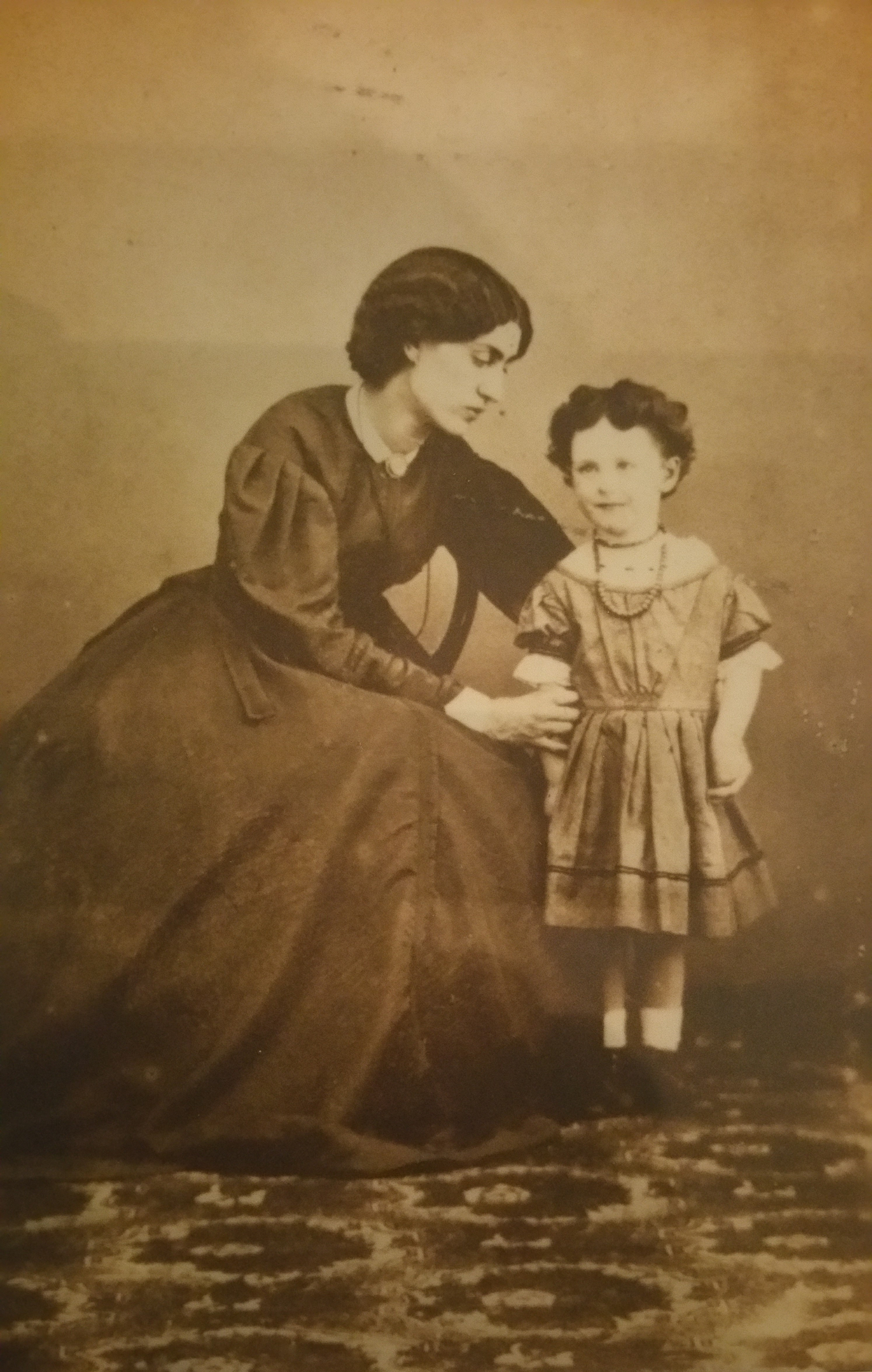
Jane and Jenny Morris c. 1864

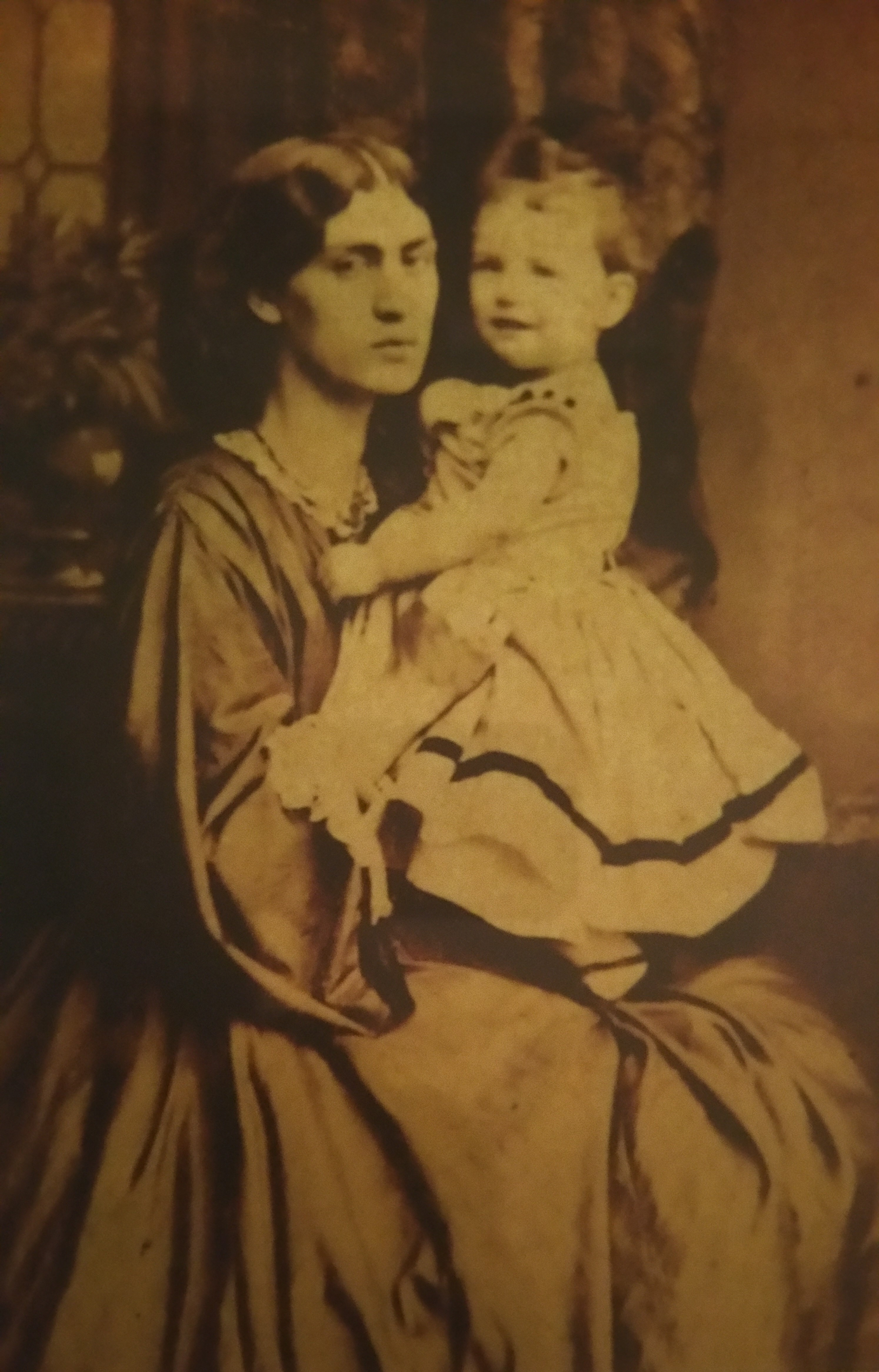
Jane and May Morris, c. 1865

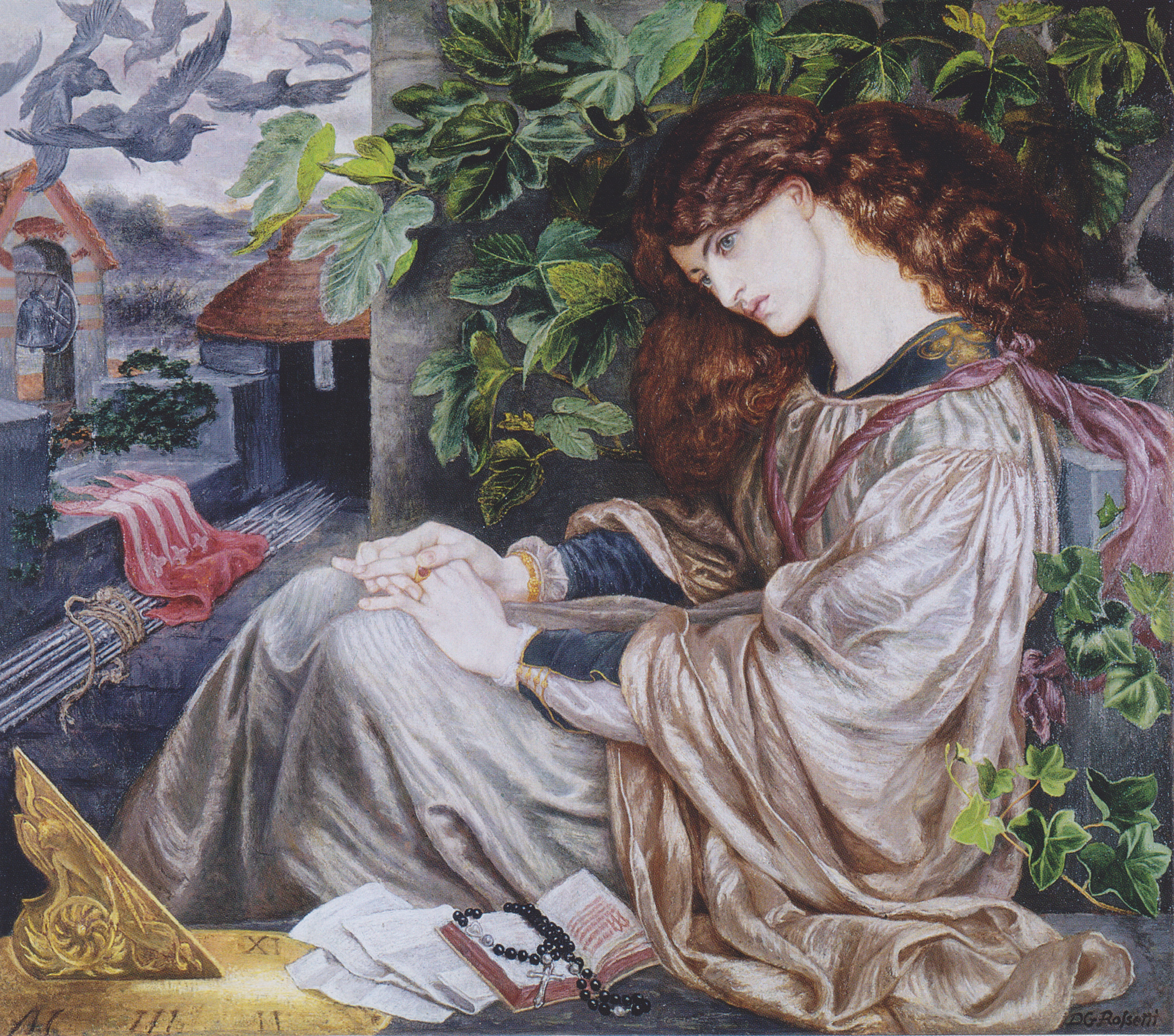
Dante Gabriel Rossetti: Pia de' Tolomei, c. 1868

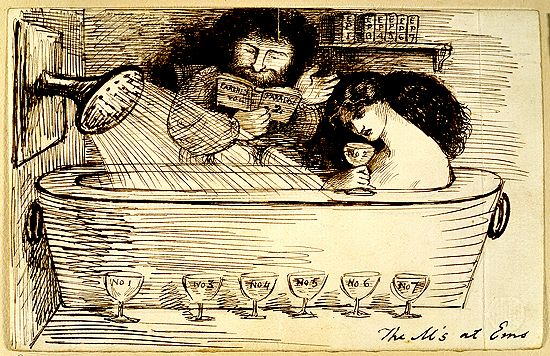
William Morris reading to Jane Morris while she takes the waters at Bad Ems, by Dante Gabriel Rossetti (1869)

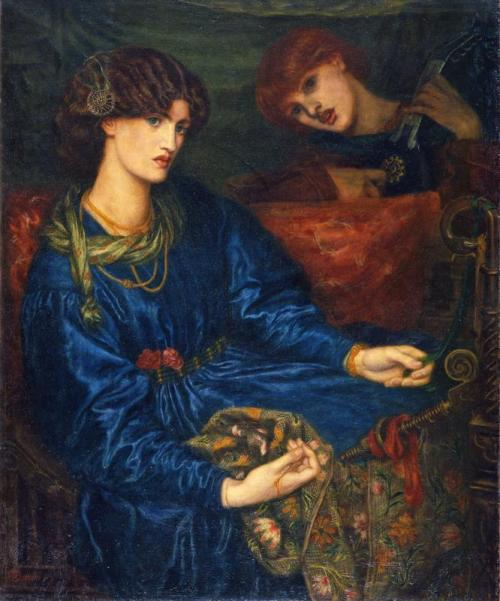
Morris as Mariana from Measure for Measure, by Dante Gabriel Rossetti (1870), Aberdeen Art Gallery

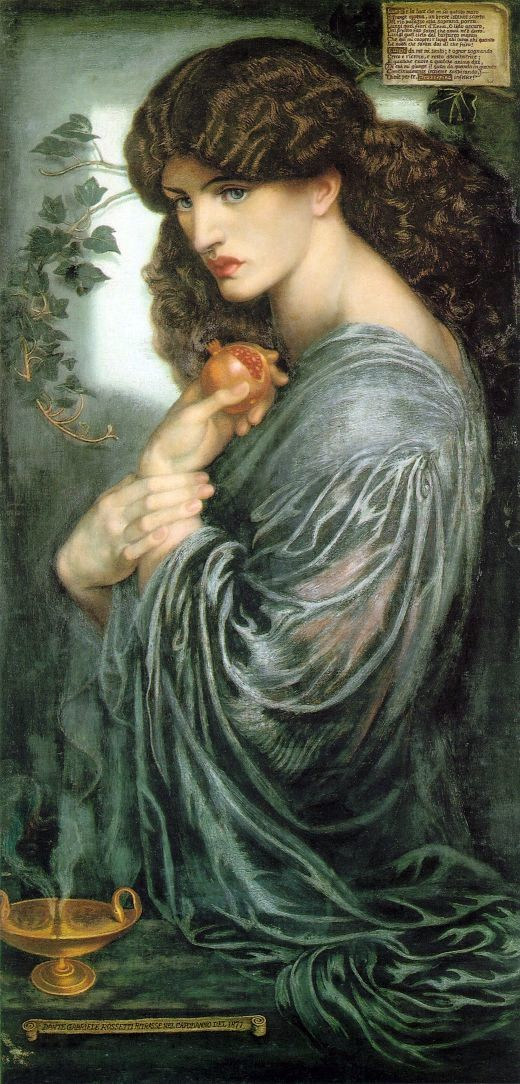
Morris painted by Dante Gabriel Rossetti as Proserpine (1874)

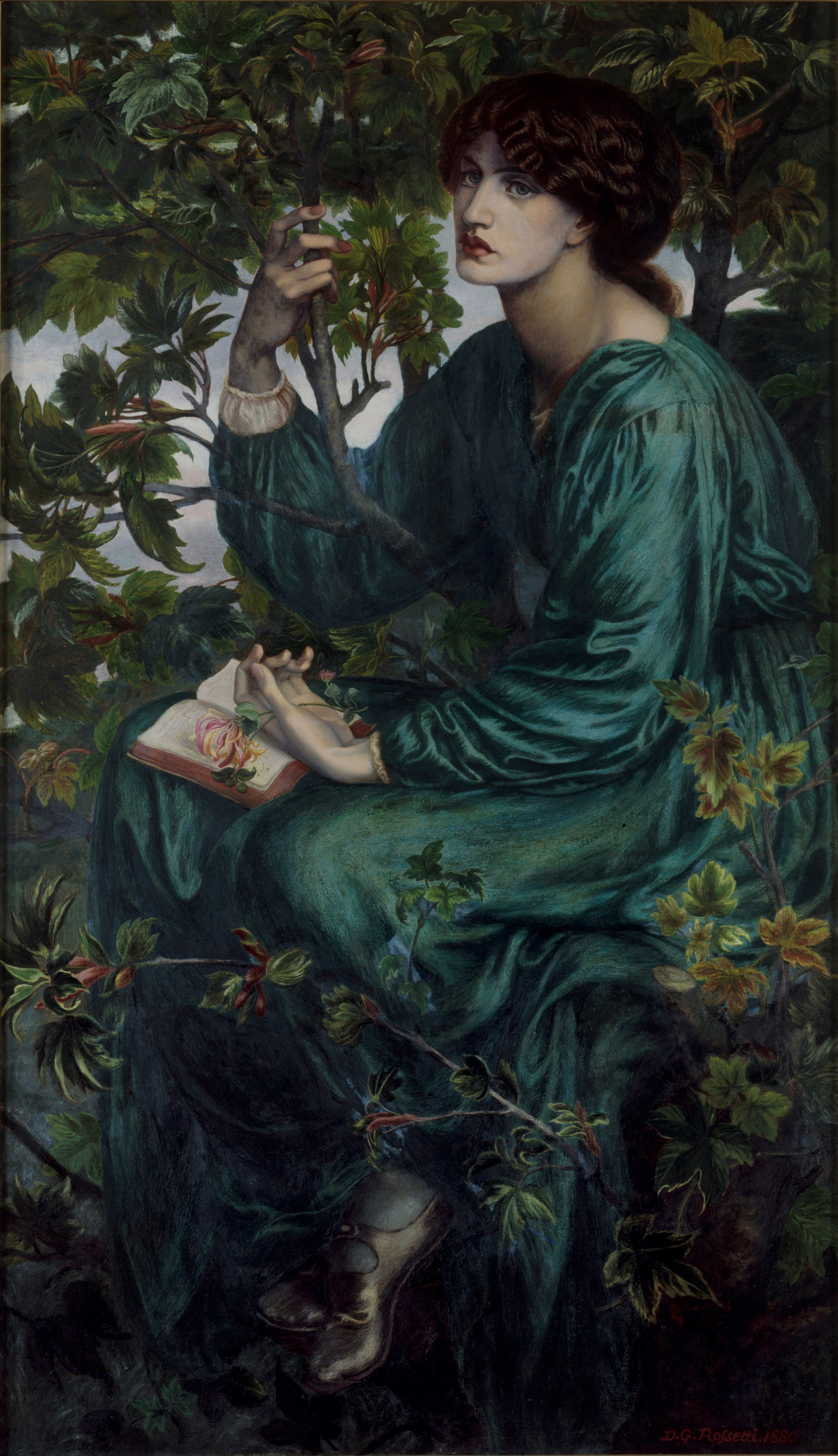
Dante Gabriel Rossetti – The Day Dream, 1880

== Paintings and artworks ==
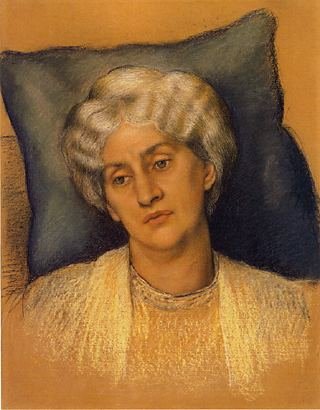
Study of Jane Morris by Evelyn De Morgan in 1904

Jane Morris's embroidery:

- Bag, embroidered silk. c.1878, Colored silks, metal mount. Victoria & Albert Museum, London.
- The Legend of Good Women embroidered panels, 1880s, by Jane Morris and Elizabeth Burden, Castle Howard.
- Honeysuckle embroidery, designed in 1876, made 1880s, silk and linen, William Morris Gallery, London.

Paintings of Jane Morris by Dante Gabriel Rossetti:

- The Blue Silk Dress, 1868.
- Proserpine or Proserpina, 1874. Oil on canvas. Tate Britain gallery, London.
- Astarte Syriaca, 1875–1879. City Art Gallery, Manchester.
- Beatrice, a Portrait of Jane Morris, 1879. Oil on canvas 13 1/2 × 11 inches.
- The Day Dream, 1880. Oil on canvas. Victoria and Albert Museum, London.
- La Donna della Fiamma, 1877. Coloured chalks. Manchester Art Gallery.
- La Donna della Finestra, 1879. Oil on canvas. Fogg Museum of Art, Harvard University, Cambridge, USA.
- La Donna Della Finestra, 1881 (unfinished).
- Jane Morris, c. 1860. Pencil.
- Jane Morris, 1865.
- Mariana, 1870. Aberdeen Art Gallery.
- Pandora, 1869.
- Pandora, 1871.
- La Pia de' Tolomei, 1866–1870. Oil on canvas. Spencer Museum of Art, University of Kansas.
- Portrait of Mrs William Morris.
- Portrait of Jane Morris, 1858. Pen.
- Reverie, 1868. Chalk on paper. Ashmolean Museum, Oxford, UK.
- The Roseleaf, 1865. Pencil.
- Study of Guinevere for Sir Lancelot in the Queen's Chamber, 1857.
- Water Willow, 1871. Delaware Art Museum

Photographs of Jane Burden by Rossetti are available at .

By William Morris:

- La Belle Iseult (also called Queen Guinevere), 1858. Oil.

By Edward Burne-Jones:

- Numerous stained-glass windows, including at Christ Church, Oxford.

By Evelyn De Morgan:

- The Love Potion 1903
- Chalk study of Jane Morris for The Hourglass, 1904. De Morgan Foundation
- The Hourglass 1905 De Morgan Foundation Wightwick Manor
