= Proserpine (Rossetti) =

Painting by Dante Gabriel Rossetti

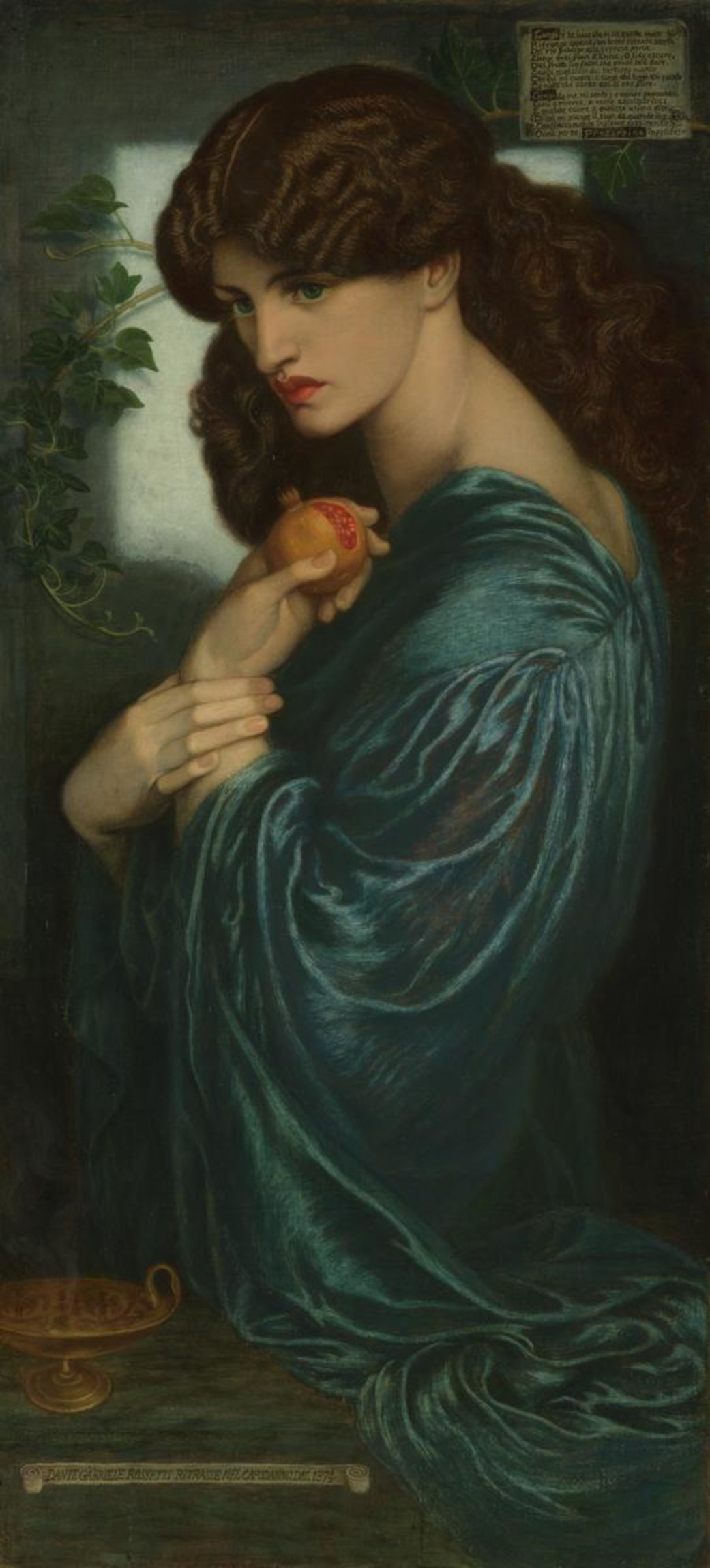
- Artist: Dante Gabriel Rossetti
- Year: 1874
- Medium: Oil on canvas
- Dimensions: 125.1 cm × 61 cm (49.3 in × 24 in)
- Location: Tate Britain, London

Proserpine (also Proserpina or Persephone) is an oil painting on canvas by British Pre-Raphaelite artist and poet Dante Gabriel Rossetti. It was made in 1874 and is now in the collection of the Tate Britain. Rossetti painted at least eight versions of the same subject from 1871 until 1882, the year of his death. Early versions were promised to Charles Augustus Howell.

The painting discussed in this article is the seventh version of Prosperine, which was commissioned by Frederick Richards Leyland. This painting is in the Tate Britain, but a very similar version of the subject is in the Birmingham Museum and Art Gallery.

== History ==
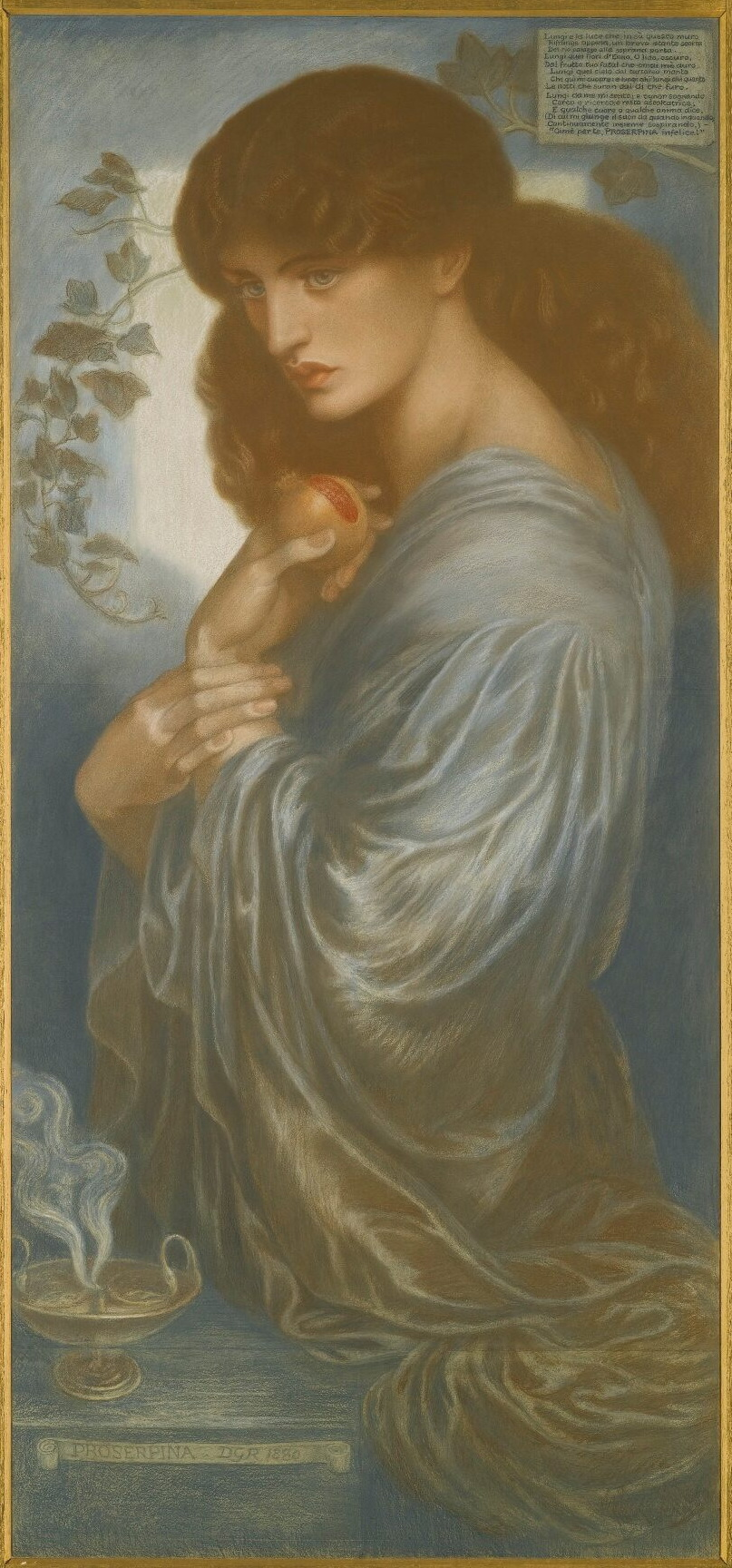
A version in coloured chalks, dated 1880.

Rossetti's Proserpine depicts the Roman goddess Proserpina who lives in the underworld during winter. In Roman mythology, Proserpina, daughter of Jupiter and Ceres, was carried off to the Underworld (Hades) by Pluto, who married her despite her love for Adonis. When Ceres begged Jupiter to return her daughter to the earth, he agreed, on condition that Proserpine had not eaten any fruits in Hades. As Proserpine had eaten six pomegranate seeds, it was decreed that she should remain in Hades for six months of the year and be allowed on the earth for the other six.

Rossetti inscribed the date 1874 on the picture, but he worked for seven years on eight different canvases of the same subject. The model for Prosperine, Jane Morris, was a friend of Rossetti and the wife of his Pre-Rapahaelite colleague William Morris. She was known for her delicate facial features, slender hands, pale skin, and thick raven hair. Rossetti painted the work at a time when his mental health was precarious and his love for Jane Morris was obsessive. Rossetti wrote about Proserpine,

She is represented in a gloomy corridor of her palace, with the fatal fruit in her hand. As she passes, a gleam strikes on the wall behind her from some inlet suddenly opened, and admitting for a moment the sight of the upper world; and she glances furtively towards it, immersed in thought. The incense-burner stands beside her as the attribute of a goddess. The ivy branch in the background may be taken as a symbol of clinging memory.

Unable to decide as a young man whether to concentrate on painting or poetry, Rossetti incorporated his own interpretation of poetic and literary sources into the work. Rossetti composed a sonnet to accompany this work that focuses on the theme of longing (see sonnet below) and may allude to a yearning to seduce Jane from her unhappy marriage with William Morris. Proserpine had been imprisoned in Pluto's underground realm for tasting the forbidden pomegranate. Jane, trapped by convention, was also tasting forbidden fruit. There is a deeper meaning in the painting as Rossetti stayed with Jane at Kelmscott Manor during the summer months each year and in winter she returned to stay with William Morris, thus paralleling Proserpine's freedom during summer.

The symbolism in Rossetti's painting indicates Proserpine's plight, as well as Jane Morris's plight, torn between her husband, the father of her two adored daughters, and her lover. The pomegranate draws the viewer's eye, the colour of its flesh matching the colour of Proserpine's full lips. The ivy behind her, as Rossetti stated, represents clinging memory and the passing of time; the shadow on the wall is her time in Hades, the patch of sunlight, her glimpse of earth. Her dress, like spilling water, suggests the turning of the tides, and the incense burner denotes the subject as an immortal. Proserpine's saddened eyes, which are the same cold blue color as most of the painting, indirectly stare at the other realm.

== The inscribed sonnet ==
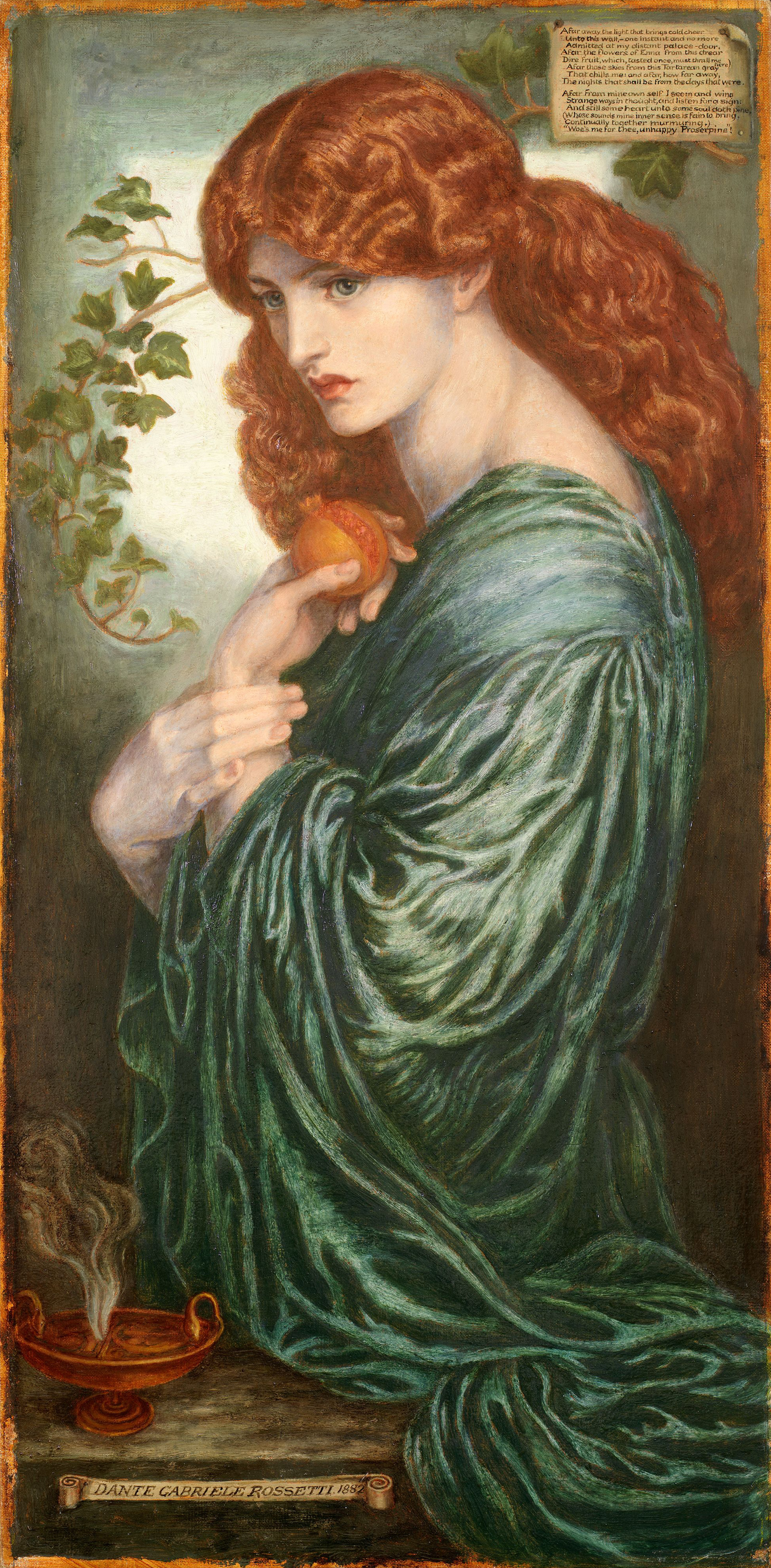
Rossetti's eighth and final version of Proserpine, now in the Birmingham Museum and Art Gallery (1882)

On the top right of the canvas "Proserpina" is inscribed by the artist, followed by his sonnet in Italian. The same sonnet in English is inscribed on the frame:

Afar away the light that brings cold cheer
Unto this wall, – one instant and no more
Admitted at my distant palace-door
Afar the flowers of Enna from this drear
Dire fruit, which, tasted once, must thrall me here.
Afar those skies from this Tartarean grey
That chills me: and afar how far away,
The nights that shall become the days that were.

Afar from mine own self I seem, and wing
Strange ways in thought, and listen for a sign:
And still some heart unto some soul doth pine,
(Whose sounds mine inner sense in fain to bring,
Continually together murmuring) —
'Woe me for thee, unhappy Proserpine'.
— D. G. Rossetti

The painting is signed and dated on a scroll at lower left: 'DANTE GABRIELE ROSSETTI RITRASSE NEL CAPODANNO DEL 1874' (in Italian) (Dante Gabriel Rossetti painted this at the beginning of 1874). The frame, designed by Rossetti, has roundels which resemble a section of a pomegranate, reflecting the sliced pomegranate in Proserpine's hand.

== Display ==
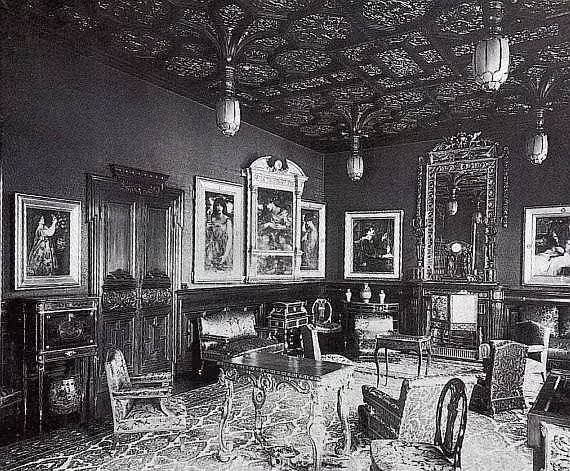
Six Rossetti paintings as hung in Leyland's drawing room, 1892. Proserpine hangs fourth from the left. (Click on any painting for its article.)

Leyland commissioned 18 paintings from Rossetti, not counting unfulfilled commissions. Soon after Leyland acquired his first Rossetti painting, he and Rossetti explored the idea of a triptych, which was eventually formed with Mnemosyne, The Blessed Damozel, and Proserpine. Three additional Rossetti paintings were then hung in Leyland's drawing room, all of which Leyland called "stunners."

== See also ==
- Proserpina
- English art
- List of paintings by Dante Gabriel Rossetti
- Rossetti and His Circle by Max Beerbohm
- Rossetti-Polidori family tree

== Sources ==
- Wildman, Stephen; Laurel Bradley; Deborah Cherry; John Christian; David B. Elliott; Betty Elzea; Margaretta Fredrick; Caroline Hannah; Jan Marsh; Gayle Seymour (2004). Waking Dreams, the Art of the Pre-Raphaelites from the Delaware Art Museum. Art Services International. p. 395.
