= Jane Alice Morris =

English embroiderer (1861–1935)

Jenny Morris
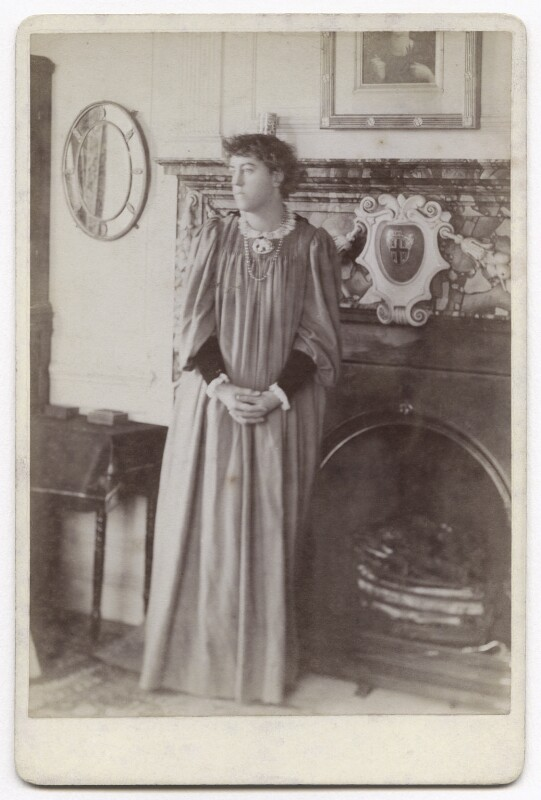
- Jenny Morris, May, 1878
- Born: Jane Alice Morris; 17 January 1861; Red House, Bexleyheath, London, England
- Died: 11 July 1935 (aged 74); Over Stowey, Somerset, England
- Resting place: St. George's Churchyard, Kelmscott, West Oxfordshire District, Oxfordshire, England
- Known for: Arts and Crafts movement
- Parent(s): William Morris; Jane Morris
- Relatives: May Morris (sister)

Jane Alice (Jenny) Morris (17 January 1861 – 11 July 1935) was an embroiderer. She was the elder daughter of William Morris and Jane Morris and sister to May Morris.

== Life ==
Jenny Morris was born 17 January 1861 at Red House, Bexleyheath, the elder child of William Morris, a designer, craftsman, and writer, and Jane Morris (née Burden), an embroiderer in the Arts and Crafts movement and artists' model. Her younger sister May Morris was born a year later.

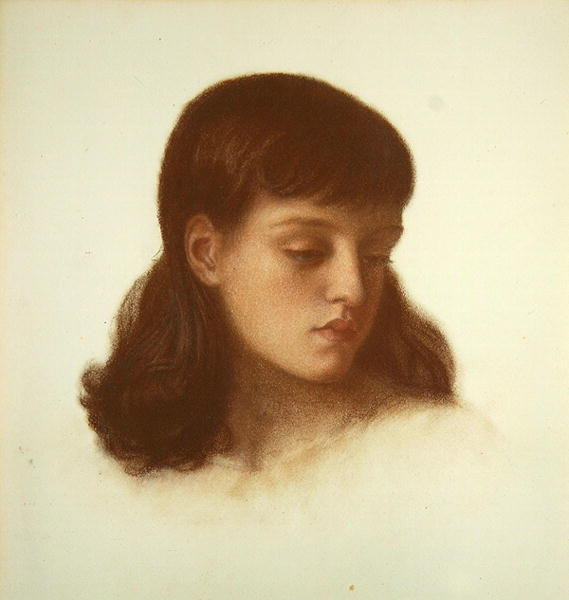
Jenny Morris by Dante Gabriel Rossetti, 1871

Jenny and her sister May were schooled at home, briefly attending Notting Hill High School. Highly intelligent, Jenny passed her Cambridge local examinations and was destined for one of the woman's colleges at Oxford or Cambridge University. However in 1876, she developed epilepsy. At first her symptoms were a relatively low level of severity, however as she got older her attacks got more frequent and severe. Whilst her parents were alive, Jenny lived at home in London, or for extended periods staying by the coast with a companion. After her mother died, her sister May took over responsibility for arranging her care.

Along with her sister and mother, Jenny was skilled in embroidery, and examples of her work are in the collection of the William Morris Gallery, London. Although these pieces show fine workmanship, her embroidery was limited to personal items for the family. A collection of letters written by Jenny to her father's legal executor Sydney Cockerell between 1897 and 1919 are in the British Library.

She died at Over Stowey (in Somerset) on 11 July 1935 at the age of 74 of diabetic complications.

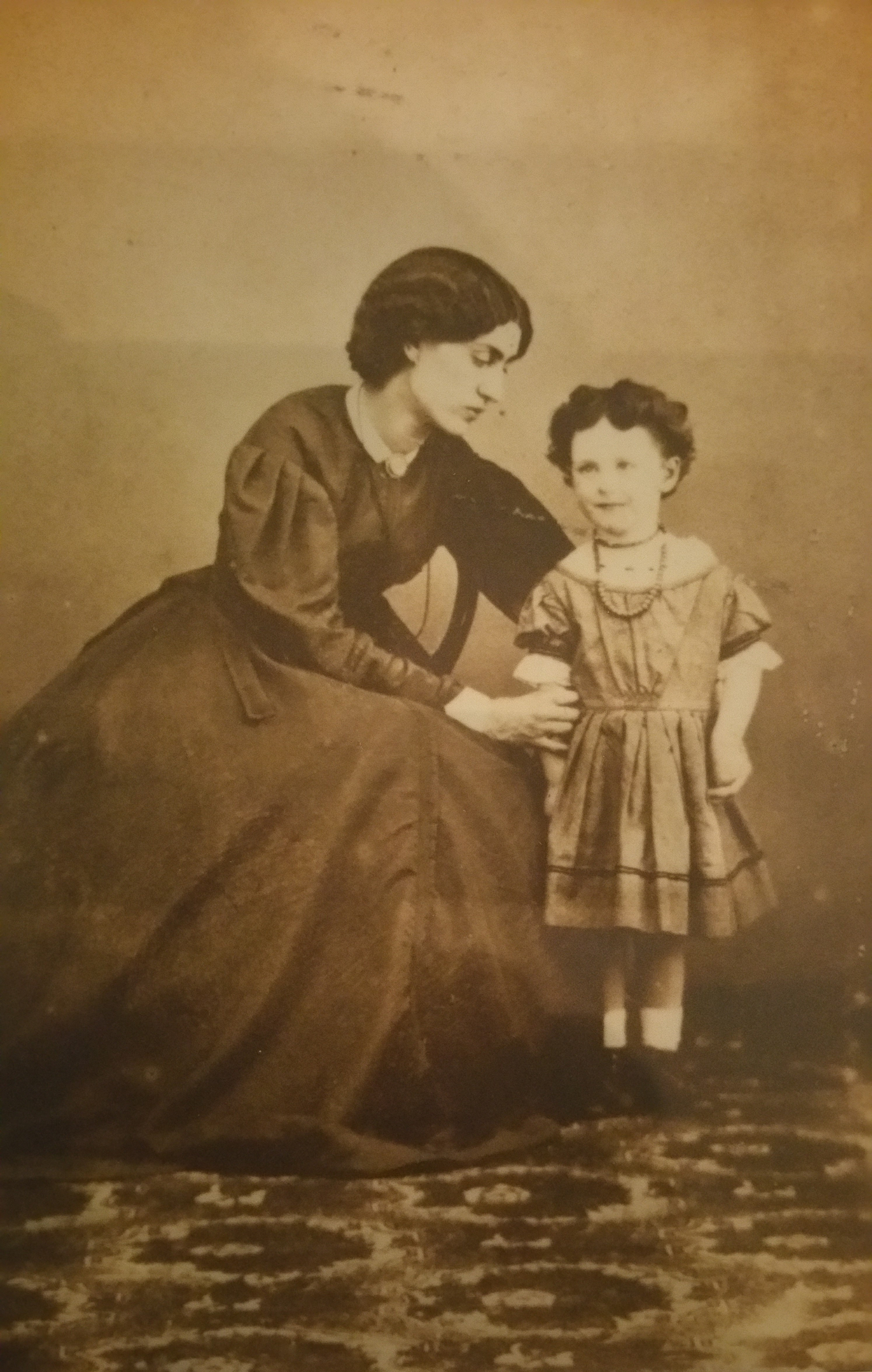
Jane and Jenny Morris circa 1864 by H. Smith

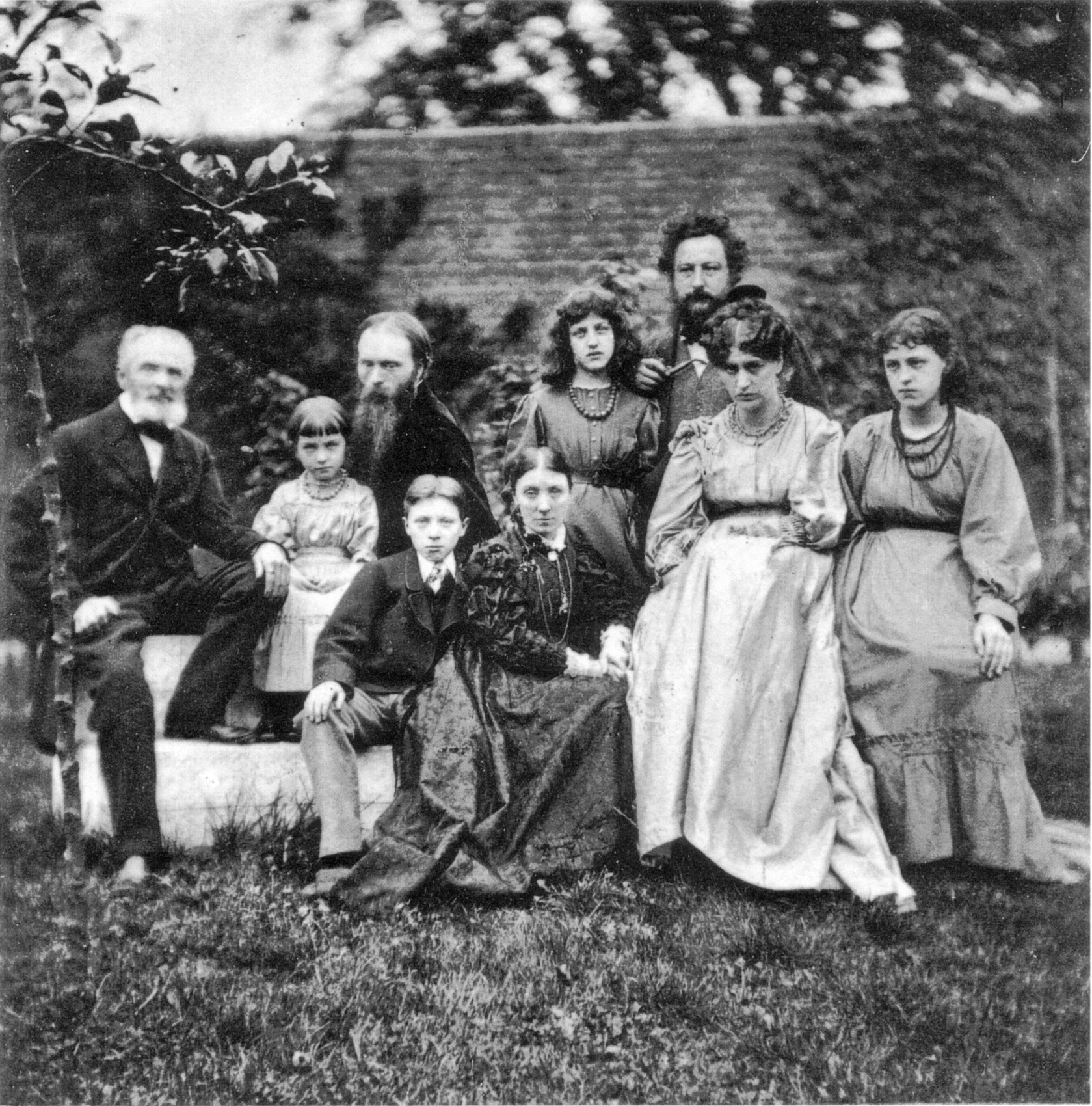
Morris and Burne-Jones Families, Jenny seated far right, photographed by Frederick Hollyer, 1874
