= Ligeia Siren =

Painting by Dante Gabriel Rossetti

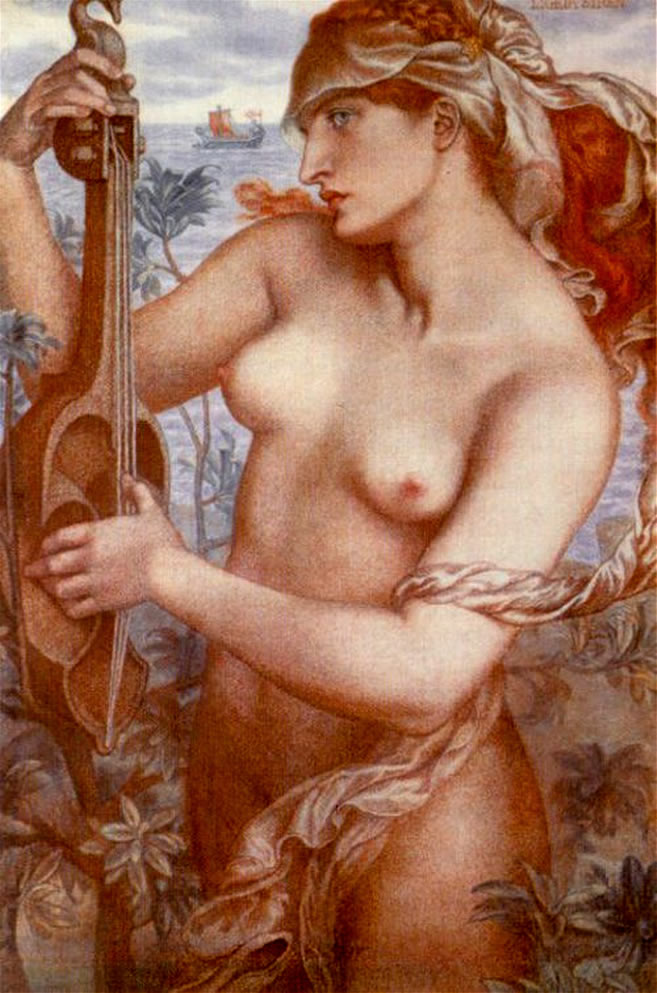
- Artist: Dante Gabriel Rossetti
- Year: 1873
- Medium: Chalk drawing / coloured chalks
- Dimensions: 79 cm × 47 cm (31 in × 18 1/2 in)
- Location: Private collection, unknown

Ligeia Siren is a chalk drawing by Dante Gabriel Rossetti completed in 1873. The painting depicts a siren, a creature from classical Greek mythology, familiar from tales such as Homer's Odyssey or Virgil's Georgics. The drawing is predominantly inspired from Rossetti's own 1869 libretto The Doom of the Sirens, in which Ligeia is one of the female leads. Instead of depicting the traditional encounter of the siren with her victims, who, entranced by her beauty and powers of music, are doomed to a terrible fate (as in The Siren (1900) by John William Waterhouse or Ulysses and the Sirens (1909) by Herbert James Draper), Rossetti depicts a timeless moment, where, contrary to the depiction in his libretto, she appears tranquil and impassive to her intended victims in the background.

In his detailed documentation of his brother's life and works, William Michael Rossetti records his brother writing of Ligeia Siren as "certainly one of my best things" and that, though it was only done in chalk, it was "quite an elaborate picture". The body is that of an unknown woman, (Note: The body model was 'a singular housemaid of advanced ideas', procured by Rossetti's assistant Henry Treffry Dunn, and willing to pose nude.) however the face is of model Alexa Wilding, whom Rossetti drew and painted often at this time, including for La Ghirlandata and Veronica Veronese. She stands amongst vegetation with an exotic instrument, staring into the distance. The bird on the instrument's headstock helps to identify the female figure as a siren from antiquity, as they were typically depicted with wings or as "birds inhabited by souls of the dead".

== The Doom of the Sirens libretto ==
Outside of his inner circle of friends, family, and wealthy patrons, Rossetti was often better known for his poetry and literature than for his paintings or drawings; however, his libretto for The Doom of the Sirens is still largely unknown. It is an ornate delivery of one of Rossetti's obsessions: the femme fatale and his "lifelong exploration of the complex social and cultural significance of the (female) figure". It was only published posthumously by his brother, William. Rossetti created several other works with subject matter concerning the myth of the siren, including the poem "Death's Songsters" (1870), a prose piece "The Orchard Pit" (1869) as well as his drawing Boatmen and Siren (1853) and his oil painting A Sea-Spell (1877).

In his libretto, Ligeia is one of the three siren sisters living on a remote island. With her song of love, Ligeia claims the life of a king and queen, but their son, the prince, is miraculously rescued by a hermit. The same hermit had previously issued the couple a warning to stay clear of the island. Before she dies the queen curses Ligeia to the same fate as her victims, that she may love and die for it. Years and years later, the rescued prince returns to the island to enact the doom of the sirens, and Ligeia meets the fate foretold in the queen's curse.

The libretto and painting explore core themes for Rossetti. One of the themes is the juxtaposition of the pagan/Christian dichotomy, the clash of a pagan mythical being and a Christian prince, and the triumph of the prince in the end. Also present, and more importantly for Rossetti, is the survival of love even when death is imminent or even after death has occurred.

== Pre-Raphaelite Brotherhood and influence ==
The Pre-Raphaelite Brotherhood (PRB) were a group of artists with core values wishing the return to artistic styles and norms to those of artists existing before Raphael, who they believed had led the art world astray. They believed that "artifice was to be abandoned in favour of an earnest truthfulness, a blurring of the boundaries between art and life, a kind of super realism which might embody a higher truth." The PRB often criticised modern art as overly dramatic and "sloshy", which they defined as anything "lax or scamped in the process". They contributed these terms to a largely popular artist at the time, Sir Joshua Reynolds, whom they loving called 'Sir Sloshua'. Many of the values of the PRB stayed with Rossetti for the rest of his creative career, even as he separated from the Brotherhood.

Many of Rossetti's later works, like Ligeia Siren, are often attributed to the Pre-Raphaelite Brotherhood although he was no longer with the group by this time. His later works were often criticised by fellow Pre-Raphaelite brothers as representative of Rossetti's own desires for the opposite sex, existing only as beauty without a purpose, and pictures lacking any moral or valuable narrative. Rossetti continued to develop his own deeply personal style, which some considered a degradation of PRB art. Some members of the PRB tried to distinguish themselves from this work by designating the period after which Rossetti participated in the fraternity as the (late) Pre-Raphaelite Brotherhood. Meanwhile, Rossetti formed a new group of his own that they lightly called the 'second generation' of Pre-Raphaelitism.

== History ==
Rossetti stopped publicly exhibiting his work after the harsh criticism he received for his painting Ecce Ancilla Domini! (1849–50). Thereafter, he predominantly sold his work directly to patrons and friends. As a result, it was impossible during his life to see several of his paintings together, making it difficult for the critics to form an impression of his visual art until much later. This affected the assessment of Ligeia Siren. According to William Michael Rossetti's detailed records of his brother's life, the chalk drawing was intended to go to William Graham along with La Ghirlandata for the price of £1,000. However it was passed over because of Ligeia's nudity. It eventually sold to a Charles Howell in August 1873. After being passed between multiple owners as debt payments, Ligeia Siren vanished from sight after 1880, resurfacing in 1973, when it was sold to a private collector by Christie's.

== See also ==
- List of paintings by Dante Gabriel Rossetti

== Sources ==
- Becker, Edwin; Prettejohn, Elizabeth; Treuherz, Julian (2003). Dante Gabriel Rossetti. Thames & Hudson. ISBN 978-0500093160.
- Macleod, Dianne S. (Autumn–Winter 1982). "Rossetti's Two Ligeias: Their Relationship to Visual Art, Music, and Poetry". Victorian Poetry. 20 (3/4): 89–102.
- Marsh, Jan (2005). Dante Gabriel Rossetti: Painter And Poet. Phoenix. ISBN 978-0753818978.
- Rossetti, Dante Gabriel (1869). "The Doom of the Sirens". Rossetti Archive. Institute for Advanced Technology in the Humanities, University of Virginia.
- Rossetti, William Michael (1889). Dante Gabriel Rossetti as Designer and Writer (1970 ed.). New York: AMS Press Inc.
- Tickner, Lisa (2003). Dante Gabriel Rossetti. British Artists Series. London: Tate Publishing. ISBN 978-1854374875.
- Upstone, Robert (2004). The Pre-Raphaelite Dream: Paintings and Drawings from the Tate Collection. London: Tate Publishing. ISBN 978-1854375216.
