= Ligeia (disambiguation) =

"Ligeia" is a short story by Edgar Allan Poe.

Ligeia may also refer to:

- Ligeia (American band), a metalcore band
- Ligeia (German band), a heavy metal band
- Ligeia (mythology), a siren in Greek mythology
- Ligeia Mare, the second-largest lake on Saturn's moon Titan (named after the siren)
- "Ligeia", a song from the thrash metal band Annihilator (band)
- "Ligeia", a song from the alternative band Bedlight for Blue Eyes

== See also ==
- Ligeia Siren, a chalk drawing by Dante Gabriel Rossetti
- The Tomb of Ligeia, a 1964 British film
- Ligia
- Ligia (name)
