= Lygia (given name) =

Lygia is a given name. Notable people with the name include:

- Lygia Bojunga Nunes (born 1932), Brazilian author of children's books
- Lygia Clark (1920–1988), Brazilian artist best known for her painting and installation work
- Lygia Fagundes Telles (born 1923), Brazilian novelist and short-story writer
- Lygia Pape (1927–2004), Brazilian artist, active in both the Concrete and Neo-Concretist movements in Brazil

== See also ==
- Ligia (name)
- Ligeia (disambiguation)
