= Ligia (given name) =

Ligia is a female given name. Notable people with the name include:

== Given names ==
=== Athletes ===
- Lígia Costa (born 1996), Brazilian handballer
- Ligia Grozav (born 1994), Romanian athlete
- Ligia Moreira (born 1992) Ecuadorean footballer
- Lígia Silva (born 1981), Brazilian table tennis player

=== Arts and literature ===
- Ligia Amadio, Brazilian conductor
- Ligia Hernández (born 1985), Venezuelan model
- Ligia Montoya (1920-1967), Argentinian artist
- Ligia Petit (born 1981), Venezuelan model and actress

=== Other ===
- Ligia B. Bieliukas (1923-1966), Lithuanian clubwoman
- Ligia Bonetti (born 1968), Dominican businesswoman
- Lígia Fonseca (born 1963), Cape Verdean lawyer
- Ligia Gargallo, Chilean chemist

== Middle names ==
- Ana Ligia Fabian (born 1988), Dominican volleyballplayer
- Ana Ligia Mixco Sol de Saca (born 1961), Salvadorean businesswoman and first lady

== Telenovelas ==
- Ligia Elena, 1982 Venezuelan telenovela
- Ligia Sandoval, 1981 Venezuelan telenovela

== See also ==
- Lygia (given name)
- Ligeia (disambiguation)
- Ligia
- Ligiah Villalobos
