= Ligeia (German band) =

German metal band

Ligeia was a German heavy metal band, best known for their 2004 album Gloria.

Having released independently, they signed with Iron Glory Records ahead of the release of Gloria in 2004.

== Discography ==
- Made of Stone (2000)
- Beyond the Sky (2002)
- Gloria (2004)
