= Veronica Veronese =

1872 painting by Dante Gabriel Rossetti

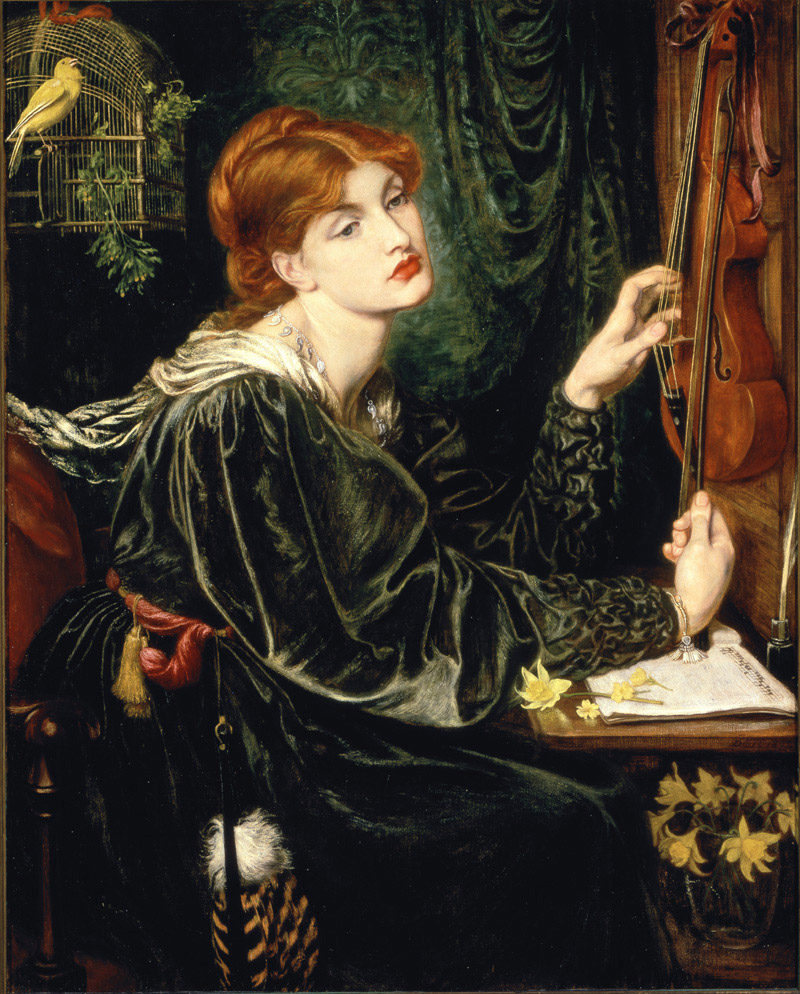
- Artist: Dante Gabriel Rossetti
- Year: 1872
- Medium: Oil on canvas
- Dimensions: 107.9 cm × 86.3 cm (42.5 in × 34.0 in)
- Location: Delaware Art Museum, Wilmington, Delaware

Veronica Veronese is an oil painting by Dante Gabriel Rossetti painted in 1872 with Alexa Wilding as the model. The painting was conceived as a companion to Lady Lilith. Rossetti sold the painting to one of his best clients, shipping magnate Frederick Richards Leyland. In 1923 it was acquired by the estate of Samuel Bancroft which donated it in 1935 to the Delaware Art Museum.

== Painting ==
Like much of Rossetti's work of the 1860s and 1870s, Veronica Veronese was inspired by Venetian painting. It is believed to represent "the artistic soul in the act of creation". This theme is expounded by the fictitious quote inscribed on the frame of the painting. Though the quote is attributed on the frame to "The Letters of Girolamo Ridolfi," critics believe that Algernon Charles Swinburne or Rossetti actually wrote it.

Suddenly leaning forward, the Lady Veronica rapidly wrote the first notes on the virgin page. Then she took the bow of her violin to make her dream reality; but before commencing to play the instrument hanging from her hand, she remained quiet a few moments, listening to the inspiring bird, while her left hand strayed over the strings searching for the supreme melody, still elusive. It was the marriage of the voices of nature and the soul—the dawn of a mystic creation.

— translation from the French by Rowland Elzea.

The symbolism in the painting includes the uncaged bird, which may represent "the marriage of the voices of nature and the soul" and overt flower symbolism. The camomile in the bird cage may represent "energy in adversity", the primroses youth, and the daffodils reflection.

Jane Morris lent the green dress in the picture. The violin was part of Rossetti's collection of musical instruments, and the fan also appeared in Monna Vanna. The few bars of musical composition on the manuscript may have been borrowed from George Boyce.

== Provenance and exhibitions ==
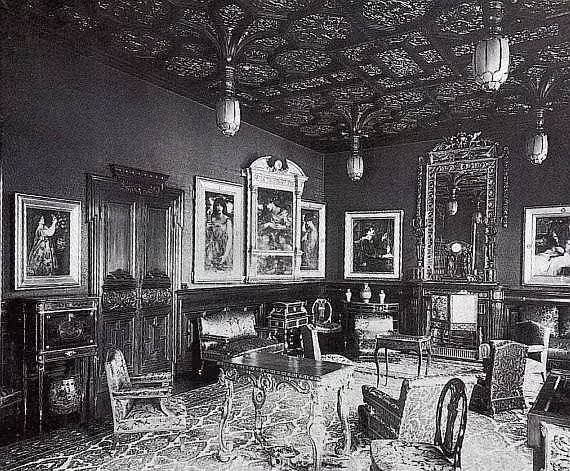
Six Rossetti paintings as hung in Leyland's drawing room, 1892. Lady Lilith hangs at the far right. (Click on any painting for its article.)

Leyland bought the painting from Rossetti in 1872 for £840 and it was sold at Leyland's estate sale, held at Christie's on 28 May 1892. The painting hung in Leyland's drawing room with five other Rossetti paintings that Leyland called "stunners."

After Leyland's estate sale, the painting changed hands three times until it was bought by Charles Fairfax Murray, another Pre-Raphaelite artist. Murray's son, John Edward Murray, sold it to the estate of Samuel Bancroft in 1923. Bancroft and his estate accumulated one of the largest collections of Pre-Raphaelite art outside of the United Kingdom and donated the collection in 1935 to the Delaware Art Museum.

The painting was exhibited in London in 1883, and in Washington, D.C. (1977), Richmond, Virginia (1982), London (1997), and Birmingham and Williamstown (2000).

== See also ==
- List of paintings by Dante Gabriel Rossetti

== Sources ==
- Wildman, Stephen; Laurel Bradley; Deborah Cherry; John Christian; David B. Elliott; Betty Elzea; Margaretta Fredrick; Caroline Hannah; Jan Marsh; Gayle Seymour (2004). Waking Dreams, the Art of the Pre-Raphaelites from the Delaware Art Museum. Art Services International. p. 395.
