= Venus Verticordia (Rossetti) =

Painting by Dante Gabriel Rossetti

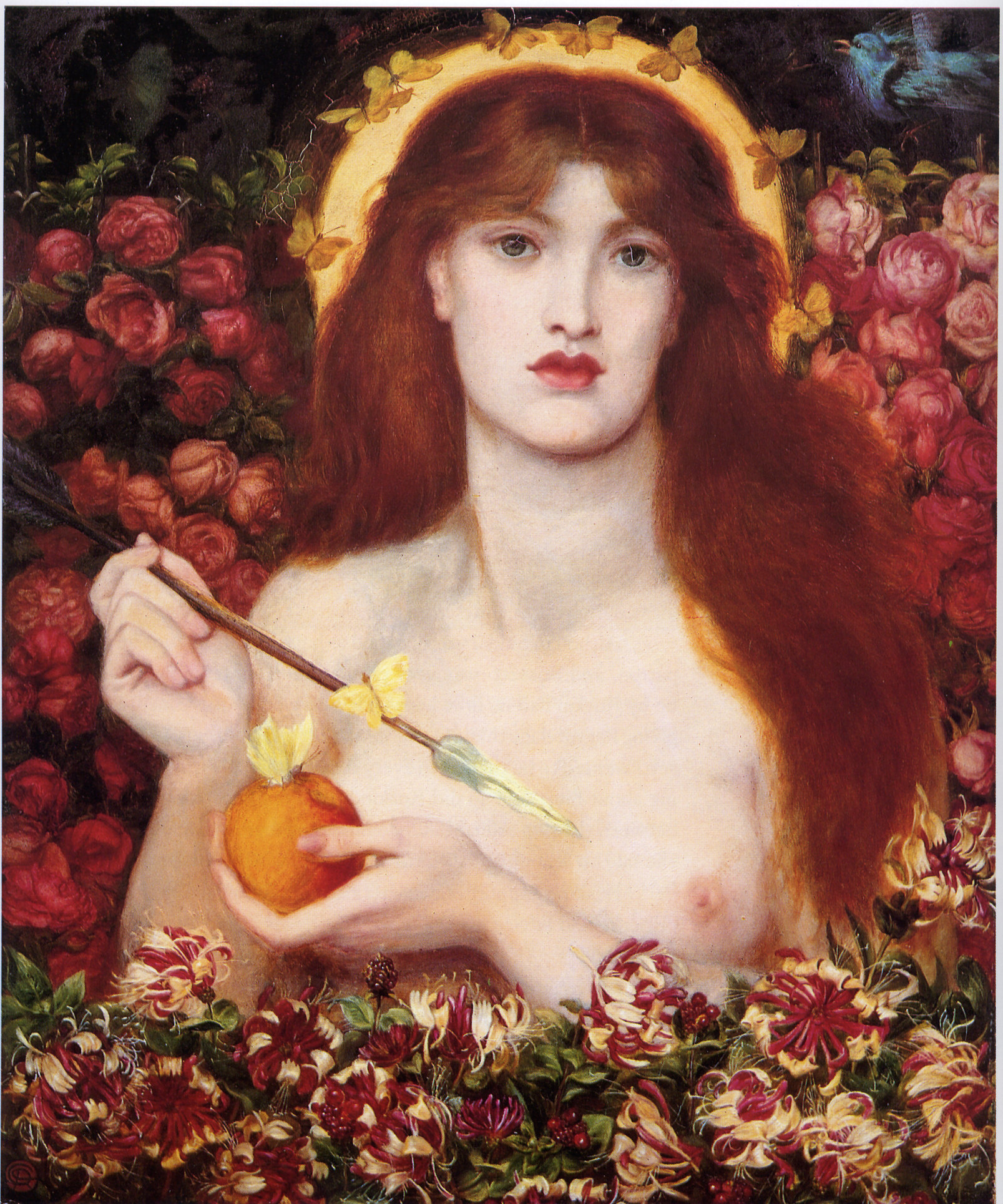
- Artist: Dante Gabriel Rossetti
- Year: 1864–1868
- Medium: Oil on canvas
- Dimensions: 98.1 cm × 69.9 cm (38.6 in × 27.5 in)
- Location: Russell-Cotes Art Gallery and Museum

Venus Verticordia (1864–1868) by Dante Gabriel Rossetti is a semi-nude depiction of the goddess Venus, portrayed as a young woman with a golden halo and flowing auburn hair, surrounded by pink flowers in a dark, lush green garden. Her left breast is visible, while the right is obscured by the golden apple she holds in her left hand. In her right hand she holds an arrow, the point directed towards her own heart, and on which rests a small yellow butterfly. Other similar butterflies ring the halo surrounding her head, and another sits on top of the apple she holds.

The title, meaning 'Venus, Changer of the heart', derives from Latin and refers to Venus's ability to turn women's hearts towards virtue.

== History of the painting ==
Patron John Mitchell of Bradford commissioned the painting from Rossetti in 1863, after seeing a chalk drawing by the artist of the model whose body was eventually used for the painting. This model was an unnamed woman, described as “a remarkably handsome cook whom he met in the street”. Rossetti worked on the painting until 1868, it was then sent to Mitchell in 1869. In 1867 Rossetti had altered the face of the Venus, changing from the features of the first model to those of Alexa Wilding. In his ‘Notes on the Royal Academy Exhibition, 1868’ Algernon Charles Swinburne wrote that "The great picture of Venus Verticordia has now been in great measure recast; the head is of a diviner type of beauty; golden butterflies hover about the halo of her hair; alight upon the apple or the arrow in her hands; her face has the sweet supremacy of a beauty imperial and immortal; her glorious bosom seems to exult and expand as the roses on each side of it. The painting of leaf and fruit and flower in this picture is beyond my praise or any man’s; but of one thing I will here take note; the flash of green brilliance from the upper leaves of the trellis against the sombre green of the trees behind. Once more it must appear that the painter alone can translate into words as perfect in music and colour the sense and spirit of his work." The painting became part the Russell-Cotes Art Gallery & Museum collection in 1945, after being purchased with assistance from the National Art Collections Fund.

== Symbolic imagery ==
The first and only major oil painting featuring a nude to be painted by Rossetti, Venus Verticordia features blatantly erotic symbolism. She is surrounded by a mass of roses and honeysuckles, during the 19th century Victorian period there was a heightened interest in the language of flowers, and these flowers would have been understood in this context as sensual metaphors of women's sexuality/genitals. As an artist, Rossetti also used the rose and honeysuckle flowers as symbols for sexual passion. The golden-tipped arrow held by Venus is Cupid's arrow’ (Cupid being her son, and himself the god of desire) is pointed towards the left side of the chest towards own heart. This suggests to the viewer the invocation of uncontrollable desire.

The apple alludes to Eris' infamous Apple of Discord which disrupted the beauty contest Judgement of Paris. In Greek mythology this story involves events leading up to the Trojan War. Paris is a Trojan swayed by his desire for the beautiful woman Helen of Troy, who been offered to him by Aphrodite (Venus). The apple also suggests the idea of the forbidden fruit and the story of the tempting of Eve by Sin in the Garden of Eden. The Christian iconography is at odds with the halo surrounding Venus, as it the cardinal sign of holiness, and furthermore in the case of female figures, purity. The yellow butterflies, eight of which fly through Venus’s halo, and two of which rest on her hands, may have several meanings. Butterflies have traditionally been symbols of the soul, and this particular swarm may represent the soul of Venus, her agents, or the involvement of the soul as well as the body in affairs of love and desire.

== Artist's poem ==
A poem Rossetti wrote to accompany the painting indicates his own interpretation of the term – as Venus turning men's hearts from fidelity to lust.

VENUS VERTICORDIA. (For a Picture.)
She hath the apple in her hand for thee,
Yet almost in her heart would hold it back;
She muses, with her eyes upon the track
Of that which in thy spirit they can see.
Haply, ‘Behold, he is at peace,’ saith she;
‘Alas! the apple for his lips,—the dart
That follows its brief sweetness to his heart,—
The wandering of his feet perpetually!’
A little space her glance is still and coy;
But if she give the fruit that works her spell,
Those eyes shall flame as for her Phrygian boy.
Then shall her bird's strained throat the woe foretell,
And her far seas moan as a single shell,
And through her dark grove strike the light of Troy.

== Critical reception ==
Well known art critic and long-time supporter of the Pre-Raphaelite Brotherhood John Ruskin strongly objected to the sexual tone and imagery in this painting. As Rossetti moved away from his early, more conventional Pre-Raphaelite style, his work began to clash with Ruskin's conservative nature. Letters between the two colleagues and friends indicate their falling out, and Ruskin's concerns with the imagery in Venus Verticordia after seeing it in Rossetti's artist studio.

"I purposely used the word ‘wonderfully’ painted about those flowers. They were wonderful to me, in their realism; awful – I can use no other word – in their coarseness." – Excerpt from a letter to Rossetti from John Ruskin, 1865

Murray Marks, a dealer in oriental porcelain, was invited by Rossetti to visit to see his collection, intending to supplying him with some blue and white porcelain; he commented, "the picture on the easel at the time, The Venus Verticordia arrested his attention, and almost took his breath away".

== See also ==
- List of paintings by Dante Gabriel Rossetti
