= La Ghirlandata =

Painting by Dante Gabriel Rossetti

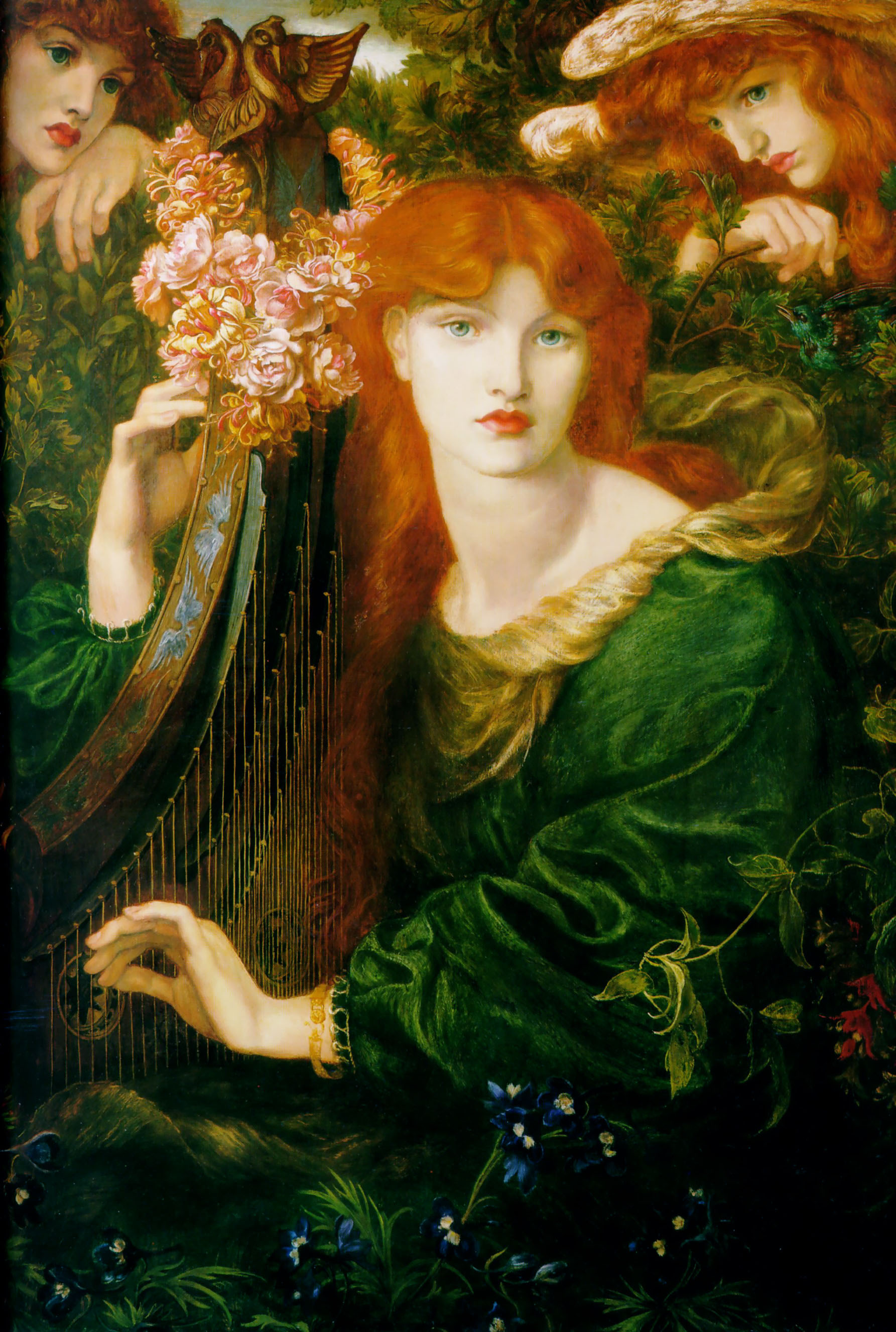
- Artist: Dante Gabriel Rossetti
- Year: 1873
- Medium: Oil on canvas
- Dimensions: 124 cm × 85 cm (49 in × 33 in)
- Location: Guildhall Art Gallery, London

La Ghirlandata ("The Garlanded Woman") is an 1873 painting by English painter and poet Dante Gabriel Rossetti. It is currently in the collection of the Guildhall Art Gallery in London, United Kingdom. The model who sat for the painting was Alexa Wilding. May Morris was the model for both angel heads in the top corners of the painting.

== See also ==
- List of paintings by Dante Gabriel Rossetti
