= Alexa Wilding =

English artists' model (1845–1884)

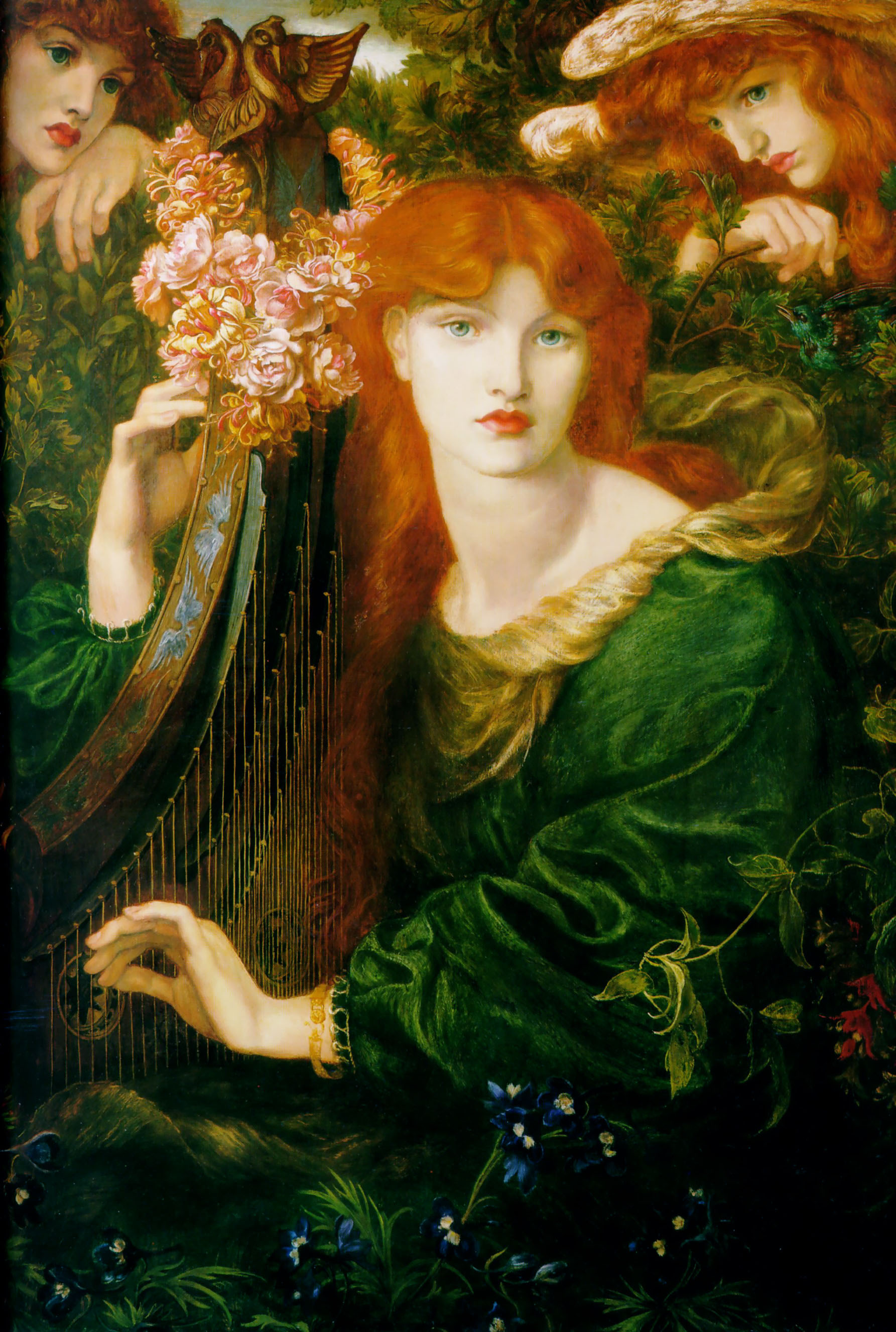
- La Ghirlandata (1873) modelled by Alexa Wilding, by Dante Gabriel Rossetti
- Born: Alice Wilding; 1847; Surrey, England
- Died: 25 April 1884 (aged 36–37); London, England
- Known for: Model (art)
- Notable work: Portrayed by Rossetti many times, 1860s and 1870s
- Movement: Pre-Raphaelites
- Children: Charles Wilding; Eleanor "Nellie" Wilding

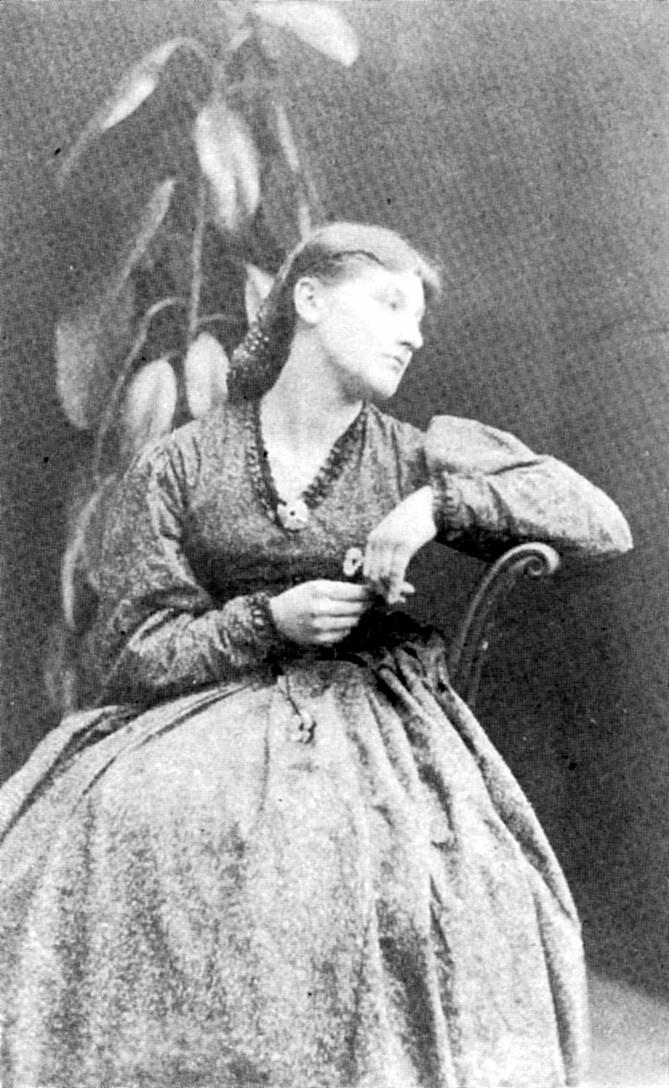
Alexa Wilding, photographed in the 1860s

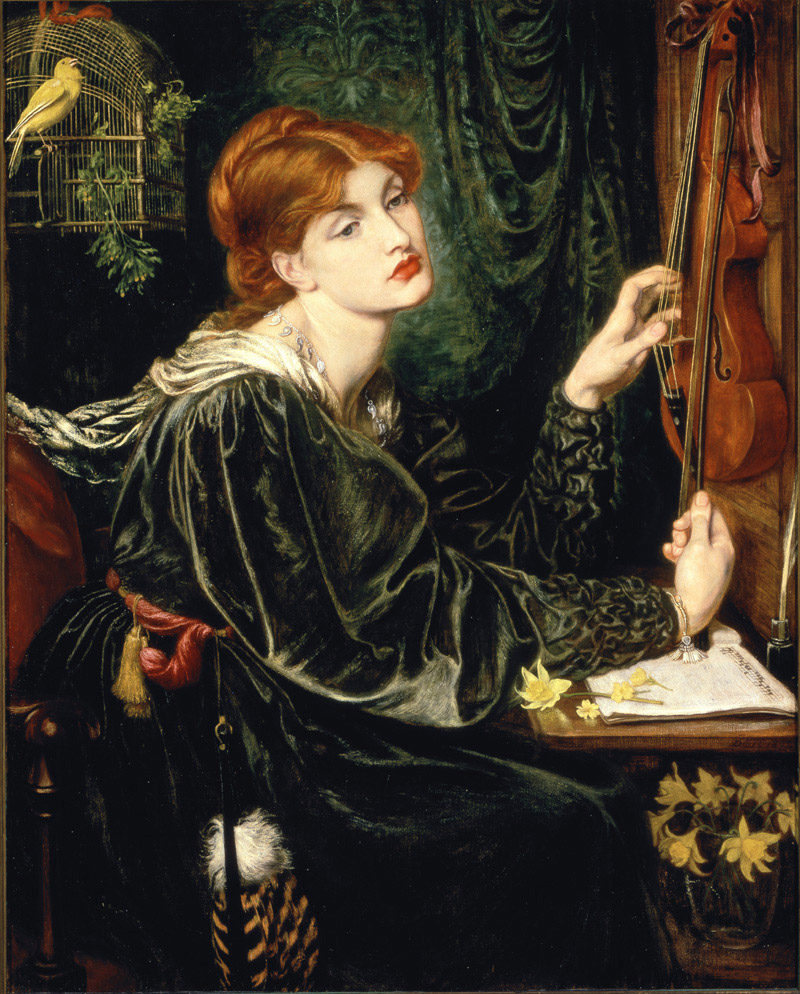
Veronica Veronese (1872)

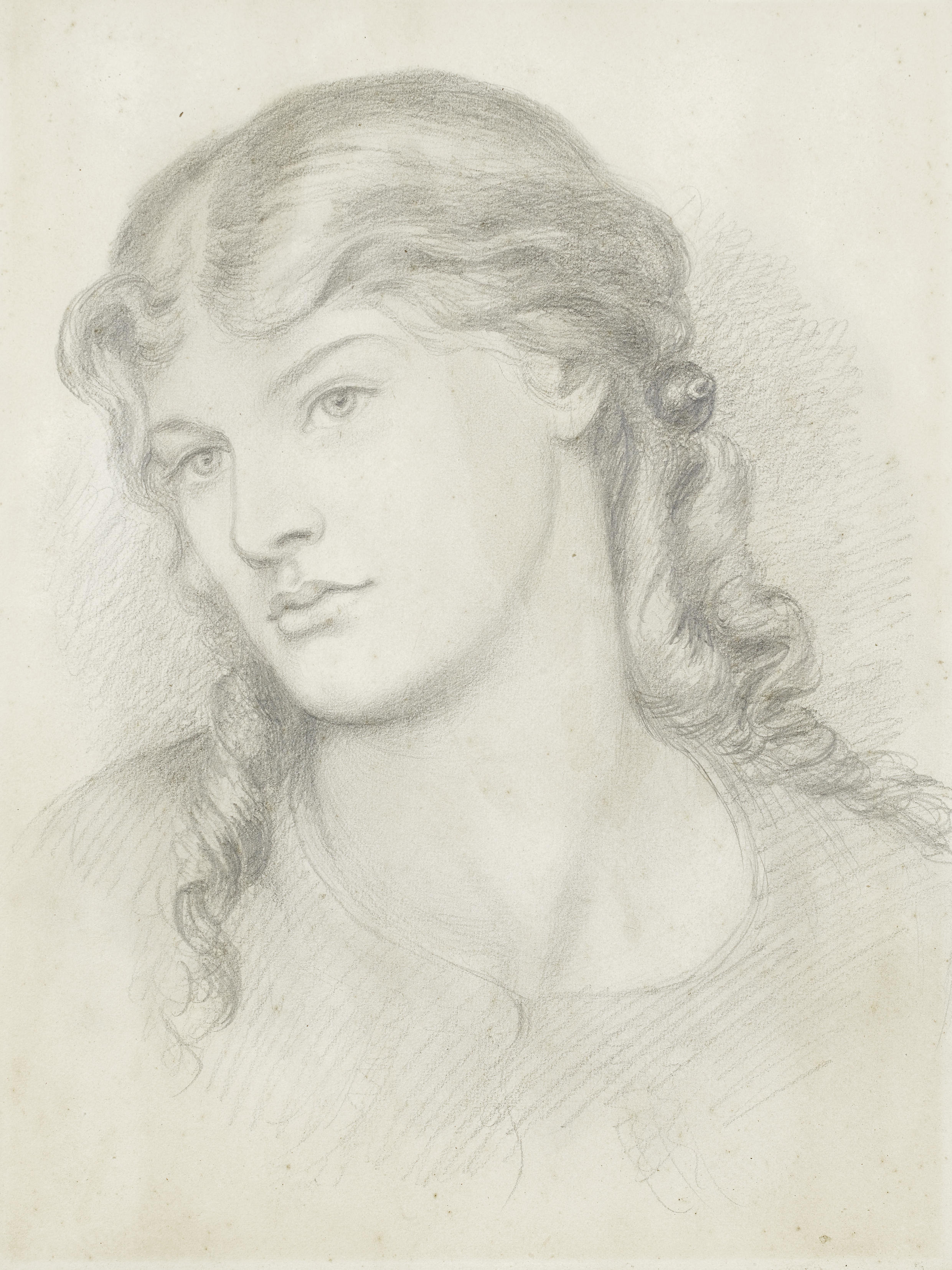
Alexa Wilding, by Dante Gabriel Rossetti, 1865

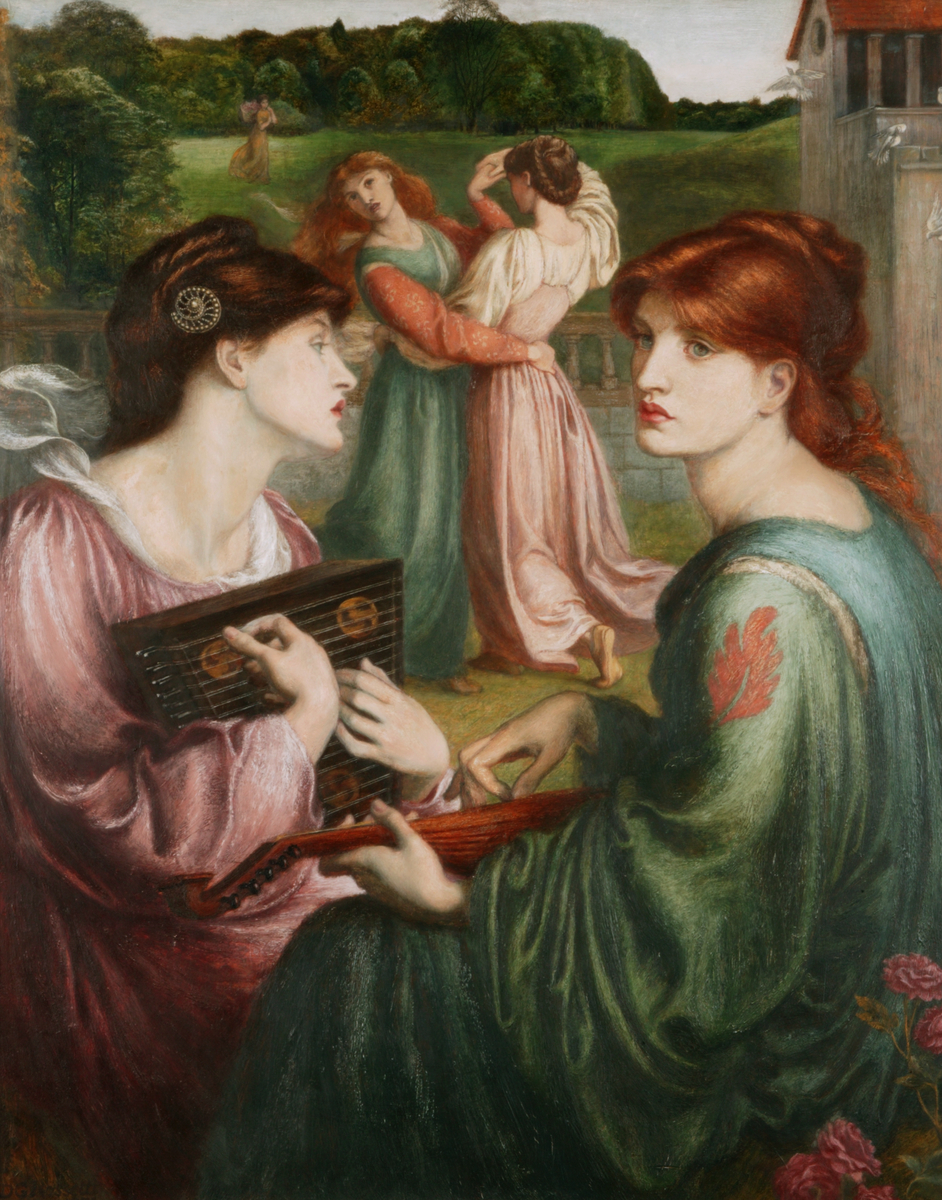
Alexa Wilding (right) in The Bower Meadow (1871–1872) with Marie Spartali Stillman (left), by Dante Gabriel Rossetti

Alexa Wilding (born Alice Wilding, c. 1847 – 25 April 1884) was an English model, one of the favourite models of the Pre-Raphaelite artist Dante Gabriel Rossetti and featured in some of his finest paintings of the later 1860s and 1870s. She sat for more of his finished works than any other of his more well-known muses, including Elizabeth Siddal, Jane Morris and Fanny Cornforth.

Comparatively little is known about Wilding, while Rossetti's other models, Siddal, Morris and Cornforth, are frequently written about. This is perhaps partly due to the lack of any romantic or sexual connection between the pair, which differentiates Rossetti's relationship with Wilding from those with some of his other muses.

== Biography ==
=== Early life ===
Alexa Wilding's working-class family originated from Shrewsbury, Shropshire, while Alexa herself (then Alice) was born an only child in Surrey in or about 1847. Her father was a piano-maker, while her father's brothers were butchers. According to the 1861 census, when she was 14, Wilding was living at 23 Warwick Lane near Newgate Market in London with her 59-year-old grandmother, two uncles and a cousin. She was a working girl, but her standard of life is not thought to have been terrible for the time, and she could read and write. By the time of her association with Rossetti, she was living with an aunt and working as a dressmaker with ambitions of becoming an actress.

=== Period as a model ===
Wilding was first seen by Rossetti in 1865, when she was walking one evening along the Strand. He was immediately impressed by her beauty. She agreed to sit for him the following day for a proposed painting of Aspecta Medusa, but failed to arrive as planned; it is possible that she was put off by the morally dubious reputation of models at that time. Weeks went by, and Rossetti had given up the idea of the painting he had in mind. So important did he consider the look of this specific model for it that when he spotted her again in the street, he jumped from the cab he was in and persuaded her to be led straight back to his studio. He paid her a weekly fee to sit for him exclusively, afraid that other artists might also employ her. She also posed for him in Kelmscott Manor where La Ghirlandata was painted. Her mixing with other guests there indicates her social ascension as professional models would not normally be invited. The two shared a lasting bond; after Rossetti's death in 1882, Wilding, though not particularly financially well off, was said to have travelled to place a wreath on his grave in Birchington-on-Sea.

In the 1881 census, Alice Wilding, aged 34, was living at 33 Redcliffe Road, Kensington, with her two young children, Charles and Nellie Wilding. Charles James Ernest Wilding was born in Hammersmith on 23 June 1876. Eleanor Wilding was born on 3 September 1877, also in Hammersmith. The identity of their father is not known. By this time Alexa held a position as a landlady and property-holder, a considerable achievement for a working-class woman. In his letters to Dunn from 1873, Rossetti complains about Wilding's housing situation, since he seems often to have been called upon to lend her money towards it; "Surely A.W. will now get rid of this mad house of hers."

In the 1860s, Wilding modelled for the painter George Price Boyce.

=== Death ===
The death certificate issued for Wilding records her death on 25 April 1884, aged 37. The cause of death was peritonitis for six days and eventual exhaustion; sixteen months earlier she had been diagnosed with a splenic tumour. This may be the disease that had previously caused Rossetti to think her ill, and prevented her sometimes from keeping her sittings.

She is buried in Brompton Cemetery, along with her grandmother, Mary Ann, and niece, Marie. While her death certificate states the date of her death as 25 April, her tombstone lists it as 24 April 1884.

== In Rossetti's art ==
In Rossetti's paintings, Wilding's elegant looks and ethereal beauty were in contrast to another of Rossetti's models, the voluptuous Fanny Cornforth. Wilding's more refined features were substituted for Cornforth's in Lady Lilith (1864–1868), in part when Rossetti's patron and owner of the painting Frederick Leyland considered the original too earthy. Similarly, the painting Venus Verticordia (1864–1868), originally modelled by a near six-foot-tall cook, was repainted with Wilding's face in January 1868. Rossetti seems to have considered her features versatile enough for the roles of both virtue, for example Sibylla Palmifera, and vice, as in the paintings mentioned here, in roles previously reserved for Cornforth.

Contemporaries seem to have disagreed over Wilding's capacity for expression: Rossetti's assistant, Henry Treffry Dunn said of her that she was "... without any variety of expression. She sat like a Sphinx, waiting to be questioned, and with always a vague reply in return... But she had a deep well of affection within her seemingly placid exterior." The artist's brother, William Michael Rossetti, meanwhile saw her as "capable of much varying expression." Dunn described Wilding as having "a lovely face, beautifully moulded in every feature, full of quiescent, soft, mystical repose that suited some of his conceptions admirably... He was struck with her beautiful face and golden, auburn hair. It was the very type of face he had been seeking so long."

Wilding's features are easy to spot in Rossetti's art; the red hair, long neck, perfect Cupid's bow lips, and somewhat softer eyes compared to Lizzie Siddal's famed heavy-lidded ones. However, in The Blessed Damozel, Wilding's features are less discernible thanks to Rossetti's portrayal of her with his late wife's eyes. Additionally two of Rossetti's paintings featuring Wilding are similar to those originally modelled for by his late wife Lizzie Siddal, Regina Cordium and Damsel of the Sanct Grael. According to his close friend, the art critic Frederic George Stephens, "nothing he drew of her, diverse as the delineations were, seemed less than an exact likeness."

== Paintings of Alexa Wilding ==
Those by Rossetti include:

- Monna Vanna (1866)
- Regina Cordium (1866); a revisit to the subject of his 1860 Regina Cordium, which had been modelled by his wife Elizabeth Siddal.
- Sibylla Palmifera (1866–1870)
- Venus Verticordia (repainted 1867-1868; originally 1864–1866), repainted with Wilding's face when it failed to sell; modelled originally by a cook whom he noticed in the street, "a very large young woman, almost a giantess".
- Dante's Dream at the Time of the Death of Beatrice (1871), far left.
- The Bower Meadow (1871–1872)
- Veronica Veronese (1872)
- Lady Lilith (repainted 1872-1873; originally 1864–1868), modelled originally by Fanny Cornforth (cf. this watercolour copy), but repainted with Wilding's face.
- La Ghirlandata (1873)
- The Beloved (retouched in 1873; originally 1863), modelled originally by Marie Ford, is also thought to be inspired by Wilding when retouched.
- Damsel of the Sanct Grael (1874)
- Roman Widow (1874)
- La Bella Mano (1875)
- A Sea-Spell (1875-1877)
- The Blessed Damozel (1875–1878); shows the influence of his next muse Jane Morris's hooded eyes.

Drawings by Rossetti include:

- Portrait of Alexa Wilding (1865)
- Sibylla Palmifera (Study) (c. 1866)
- Aspecta Medusa (c. 1867)
- Mary Magdalene (1867)
- Rosa Triplex (1867), centre.
- Venus Verticordia (Study) (1867–68)
- Study for ′La Pia de′ Tolomei′ (1868)
- Alexa Wilding, A Study for Dante's Dream (1870)
- Study for "Dante's Dream": Head of Alexa Wilding (1870)
- Lady Lilith - Study for the Head (1872-1872)
- Alexa Wilding (1874)
- Study for ′La Bella Mano′ (1875)
- Alexa Wilding (1879)
