= Demotte =

Demotte or DeMotte may refer to:

People:

- Rudy Demotte (born 1963), Belgian socialist politician and former Minister-President of Wallonia
- William Demotte (born 1991), professional rugby union player
- George Joseph Demotte (1877-1923), Belgian-born art dealer with galleries in Paris and New York City

Places:

- DeMotte, Indiana in the United States

Other:

- Demotte Shahnameh, also known as the Great Mongol Shahnameh, illustrated manuscript of the national epic of Greater Iran
