= Water Willow =

Water willow may mean:

- Decodon verticillatus, a species of flowering plant
- Dianthera americana, a species of flowering plant known commonly as American water-willow
- Justicia, a genus of flowering plants
- Water Willow (Rossetti), an 1871 painting by Dante Gabriel Rossetti

== See also ==
- False waterwillow
