= Stephanie Godwin =

English painter and illustrator (1917–2006)

Stephanie Godwin (10 June 1917 – 7 January 2006), also known as Stephani Godwin, Stephanie Scott-Godwin and Stephanie Scott-Snell, was an English painter and illustrator. She was born Stephanie Mary Allfree in Venice and grew up in London, the daughter of Geoffrey Stephen Allfree (1889–1918), an artist who was a member of the Royal Society of British Artists and an official war artist. Her father drowned when she was a year old in St Ives Bay while on active service with the Royal Navy in September 1918.

She studied at the Byam Shaw School of Art, where she met the artist Edward Fell Scott-Snell (1912–1988). They married in 1940 and moved into Kelmscott Manor, for which they had taken out a lease from May Morris before her death in 1938. They were the first permanent tenants of the Manor after the family of William Morris. While there they painted, wrote poetry, took drugs (Benzedrine, referring to it under the name "starlight") and jointly authored and illustrated a book on William Morris. Their younger son Joscelyn Godwin was born there in 1945.

After the war the couple changed their surname to Godwin, the name of Stephanie's mother. They emigrated to the US in 1948, settling at the artists colony in Woodstock, New York. A joint exhibition at the Demotte Galleries in New York two years later proved to be a failure. To make a living they began producing illustrations for children's books. Edward had previously worked as a book illustrator.

They separated in 1954. Stephanie continued to paint, mostly landscapes. Aged only 51 in the 'summer of love', she "embraced hippydom with some enthusiasm". Much of her early work was destroyed by her, or lost. She died at Woodstock in 2006, aged 88.

Joscelyn Godwin edited and published a selection of Stephanie and Edward's writings, letters and diaries in 2015. An exhibition, Only there is Life: the artists Edward and Stephani Scott-Snell, was presented at Kelmscott Manor between June and October 2018. Her painting Tondo: The Cherry Ribbon was sold at Rosebery's Fine Art Auctioneers in 2024.
