= Arktos (book) =

1993 book by Joscelyn Godwin

- Cover of the first edition
- Author: Joscelyn Godwin
- Language: English
- Subject: Polar regions of Earth, occultism in Nazism
- Publisher: Phanes Press/Thames & Hudson
- Publication date: 1993
- Publication place: United States/United Kingom
- Media type: Print (paperback)
- Pages: 260
- ISBN: 0-933999-46-1
- OCLC: 26547412
- Dewey Decimal: 001.94
- LC Class: BL2670 .G63 1993

Arktos: The Polar Myth in Science, Symbolism, and Nazi Survival is a 1993 book by historian of occultism Joscelyn Godwin. The book is a history of mythic and occultist interest in the polar regions of Earth, the Arctic and Antarctic, particularly in the context of and their influence on the mythology of occultism in Nazism. The book was first published in 1993 by Phanes Press in the United States and by Thames & Hudson in the United Kingdom.

It covers the presence of polar myths in many traditions from the ancient to the modern day, and its manifestations in Theosophy, Hollow Earth theories, and Nazi occultism. Godwin also discusses the legendary hidden realms of Agartha, Shambhala and Hyperborea. The book received largely positive reviews and academic assessments, with praise for its scholarly coverage of a fringe and confusing topic.

== Background and publication history ==
Joscelyn Godwin is a historian of occultism and Western esotericism. At the time of the book's publication, he taught at the music department of Colgate University.

Arktos was first published in 1993 by Phanes Press in Grand Rapids, Michigan, and in paperback by Thames & Hudson in London in the same year. Both editions are 260 pages long. In 1996, Arktos was republished by Adventures Unlimited Press in Kempton, Illinois.

== Contents ==
Following a preface, the book is split into five parts, each with multiple chapters. Godwin writes that in his approach to the book, he has "tried above all to separate the sense from the nonsense and to trace each rank growth to its roots". In the preface, Godwin writes of what drew him to his interest in the polar regions and their mythology, its repeated mention in occult literature.

The book profiles a variety of polar myths and their significance, from the ancient to the modern, though primarily in the 19th century, focusing on their influence on the occult. Godwin begins the body of the book with a note: the polar axis sits at about 23 1/2 degrees. He notes the history of a belief in its shift; this belief in a change in the degree of the polar axis serves as a motif in the work. In Part I, "Prologue in Hyperborea", Godwin traces the idea of an imagined "Golden Age" in spirituality. Godwin examines the ideas of Theosophy and its originator Helena Blavatsky, describing Blavatsky as "the most fecund source of ideas on our subject", and the occultist René Guénon, whose writings both wrote of a kind of polar myth and the mythical northern region of Hyperborea. He writes about the Hollow Earth in relation to the topic.

Part II, "The Northern Lights", has Godwin covers these earlier ideas and their alleged connection to Nazi currents and Nazi occultism, particularly the Thule Society, which are widespread in popular mythology. Godwin argues such myths influenced some occultist Nazi ideas and he traces borrowings from Theosophy to the influence of polar myths on Nazi ideas. "The Hidden Lands", Part III, covers hidden kingdoms portrayed as having ties to the polar regions, including Agartha, Shambhala, and Thule. As part of his coverage of the latter, he writes about science fiction writer Raymond Palmer and the Shaver hoax. Godwin also writes about neo-Nazi belief in polar ideas, including that that Hitler survived in Antarctica and the works of Miguel Serrano.

While in Part IV, "Arcadia Regained", Godwin writes about the history of ancient symbolic or mythic views of the polar regions, and additional spiritual approaches. The final section, "The Tilt", begins with an exploration of a "catastrophic" belief in a polar shift, as well as other theories on its meaning and consequences through history. In his conclusion, Godwin argues that whether life is actually better or worse, "the overall tone of global life has never been worse", but that "it is much too large to worry about" the world ending in such a dramatic fashion as the prophets he wrote about speculate. Following the main content of the book are endnotes, a bibliography, a list of image sources, and an index.

== Reception ==
The book received largely positive reviews and academic assessments. A review in the journal Polar Record said it was "probably as good a book as one could want on this subject", and was rather a history of ideas instead of a book with firm conclusions. Western esotericism scholar Nicholas Goodrick-Clarke, writing for The Times, called it, given the subject matter, a "masterpiece of clarity and economy", and an "Ariadne's thread through the tangled web of myths, scientific notions and religious beliefs surrounding the poles". L. Sprague de Camp praised the book in the journal Nature as a "remarkably comprehensive coverage of the pseudoscientific field in recent centuries, well written and knowledgeable"; he also said that, "having myself read through much of the Higher Nonsense in getting material for my own books, I must admire Godwin's stamina in wading through the vast quantities listed in his bibliography".

Michael Barkun noted it as "the most complete scholarly treatment of the place occupied by polar regions in esoteric literature". Speaking about Theosophy, Richard Noll called the book an "interesting and scholarly discussion of these issues from an occultist perspective". Goodrick-Clarke noted it in his book Black Sun as extensively analyzing the Shamballah and Agartha myths, and described its summaries of the works of Wilhelm Landig as admirable. Polar Record praised the bibliography and the wide range of materials used as sources, and called it a good entry point for obscure writings on polar topics. De Camp noted the book sometimes veered off track, but said that this was only natural for a topic where talking about it was "like trying to measure a cloud with a surveyor's tape". Historian and writer on esotericism K. Paul Johnson said the book was "a valuable contribution to the study of modern esotericism", praising Godwin for applying "the techniques and standards of intellectual history to a body of literature generally ignored by scholars". He wrote that the "subject matter of Arktos is intriguing and the explanations marvelously clear, especially considering how convoluted the doctrines in question are".

Writing for The Times Literary Supplement, Francis Spufford gave a more critical review; while noting Godwin did not "succumb in the more obvious ways to the danger of this material", writing that he was critical and uncharmed by "fascist romance", he saw problems with Godwin's approach. Spufford wrote that despite Godwin's obvious skepticism he seemed to be searching for the truth of a real polar tradition behind the false, and that he was reading too deeply into their mythologies. De Camp praised his attitude as fair, but also not taken in by the material. Wouter Hanegraaff, calling Godwin "one of the most knowledgeable and articulate scholars in the modern academic study of Western esotericism", praised Arktos as one of a few books on this topic that were "academic studies of high quality, without much evidence of the characteristic 'religionist' tone and perspective".
