= Joscelyn Godwin =

British composer and author (born 1945)

- Born: Joscelyn Godwin; 16 January 1945 (age 81); Kelmscott, Oxfordshire, England
- Occupations: Professor, author, translator
- Known for: Ancient music, paganism, occult/esoterica
- Notable work: Arktos

Joscelyn Godwin (born 16 January 1945) is a historian of the occult and esotericism. He is also a musicologist and translator known for his work on ancient music, early music, paganism, and music in the occult and spiritualism; a harpsichordist; and an occasional composer.

== Biography ==
Godwin was born on 16 January 1945 at Kelmscott, Oxfordshire, England. He is the younger son of the artists Edward and Stephanie Scott-Godwin, the first permanent residents to occupy Kelmscott Manor after the family of William Morris.

He was educated as a chorister at Christ Church Cathedral School, Oxford, then at Radley College (Music Scholar), and Magdalene College, Cambridge (Music Scholar; B.A., 1965, Mus. B., 1966, M.A. 1969). Moving to the US in 1966 he studied musicology at Cornell University, taught at Cleveland State University for two years, and then joined the Colgate University Music Department in 1971. He retired from Colgate in 2016 as Professor Emeritus of Music.

He has written, edited or translated many books on occultism and pagan music, including: Harmonies of Heaven and Earth (on the spiritual dimensions of music); Music and the Occult (a study of occult philosophy and its expression in music); a biography of English physician and mystical philosopher Robert Fludd; Athanasius Kircher’s Theatre of the World (a biography of Athanasius Kircher, a Jesuit, linguist, archaeologist and scholar); Arktos (an exploration of the mythology surrounding the Earth's polar regions); and Atlantis and the Cycles of Time.

Wouter Hanegraaff described him as "one of the most knowledgeable and articulate scholars in the modern academic study of Western esotericism".

== Bibliography ==
=== Books authored or co-authored ===
- Robert Fludd: Hermetic Philosopher and Surveyor of Two Worlds. London: Thames & Hudson, 1979; also published in French, Greek, Spanish, and Japanese. Republished by Adventures Unlimited Press.
- Athanasius Kircher: A Renaissance Man and the Quest for Lost Knowledge. London: Thames & Hudson, 1979; also published in French, German, Spanish, and Japanese.
- Mystery Religions in the Ancient World. London: Thames & Hudson, 1981, ISBN 0500110190; paperback, 1982, ISBN 0060631406; also published in Greek and Japanese.
- Harmonies of Heaven and Earth: The Spiritual Dimension of Music from Antiquity to the Avant-Garde. London: Thames & Hudson, 1987; also published in French, German, and Japanese; partly published in Spanish. Republished by Inner Traditions.
- Music and the Occult: French Musical Philosophies 1750–1950. Rochester: University of Rochester Press / London: Boydell & Brewer, 1995; also published in French and Japanese.
- The Mystery of the Seven Vowels in Theory and Practice. Grand Rapids, Michigan: Phanes Press, 1991; also published in Italian.
- Arktos (1993). Grand Rapids, Michigan: Phanes Press, 1993, also published in German (two different editions), Japanese, Greek, French, Italian, and Spanish. Republished by Adventures Unlimited Press.
- The Theosophical Enlightenment. Albany: State University of New York Press, 1994.
- Johann Friedrich Hugo Von Dalberg (1760–1812): Schriftsteller, Musiker, Domherr. Co-authored with Michael Embach. Mainz: Gesellschaft für mittelrheinische Kirchengeschichte, 1998; in German.
- The Pagan Dream of the Renaissance. Grand Rapids, Michigan: Phanes Press / London: Thames & Hudson, 2002.
- The Real Rule of Four. New York: Disinformation Company, 2004; also published in French and Portuguese.
- The Golden Thread: The Ageless Wisdom of the Western Mystery Traditions. Wheaton, Illinois: Quest Books, 2007.
- Athanasius Kircher's Theatre of the World. London: Thames and Hudson, 2009; ISBN 978-0-500-25860-6.
- Atlantis and the Cycles of Time: Prophecies, Traditions, And Occult Revelations. Rochester, Vermont: Inner Traditions, 2011; ISBN 978-1-59477-857-5.
- Upstate Cauldron: Eccentric Spiritual Movements in Early New York State. Albany: State University of New York Press, 2015; ISBN 978-1-4384-5595-2.
- The Forbidden Book: A Novel. Co-authored with Guido Mina di Sospiro. Revised edition, New York: The Disinformation Company, 2011 (electronic book). Print edition: San Francisco: Disinformation Books (by then an imprint of Red Wheel/Weiser), 2013. ISBN 193887501X. Also published in Spanish, Danish, Russian, Greek, Bulgarian, Polish, Romanian, and Thai.
- Forbidden Fruits: An Occult Novel. Co-authored with Guido Mina di Sospiro. Rochester, Vermont: Inner Traditions, 2020; ISBN 1644111578.

=== Books edited ===
- Alessandro Scarlatti, Marco Attilio Regolo. Cambridge, Massachusetts: Harvard University Press, 1975 (series: The Operas of Alessandro Scarlatti, vol. 2).
- Schirmer Scores: A Repertory of Western Music. New York: Schirmer Books, 1975.
- Music, Mysticism and Magic: A Sourcebook. London: Routledge & Kegan Paul, 1986; Harmondsworth: Penguin Arkana.
- Michael Maier, Atalanta Fugiens: An Edition of the Fugues, Emblems and Epigrams. With an introductory essay by Hildemarie Streich. Tysoe, Warwickshire: Magnum Opus Hermetic Sourceworks, 1987; Grand Rapids, Michigan: Phanes Press. Included a cassette tape of the first complete recording of the fifty Fugues, sung by Rachel Platt, Emily Van Evera, Rufus Muller, and Richard Wistreich. The recording has been remastered and issued on compact disc by Claudio Records. Spanish edition with expanded introduction, La Fuga della Atalanta, Girona, Spain: Ediciones Atalanta, 2007.
- Marius Schneider, Rudolf Haase, and Hans Erhard Lauer: Cosmic Music. Three Musical Keys to the Interpretation of Reality, translated by Marton Radkai and Joscelyn Godwin. Rochester, Vermont: Inner Traditions, 1989.
- Paul Brunton: Essential Readings. Co-edited with Randall Cash and Timothy Smith. Wellingborough, Northamptonshire: Crucible Books, 1990.
- Harmony of the Spheres: A Sourcebook of the Pythagorean Tradition in Music. Rochester, Vermont: Inner Traditions, 1993; also published in Spanish (Girona: Atalanta, 2009), with illustrations and a new introduction.
- The Hermetic Brotherhood of Luxor: Historical and Initiatic Documents of an Order of Practical Occultism. Co-edited with Christian Chanel and John Patrick Deveney. York Beach, Maine: Samuel Weiser, 1995. Also published in French and Italian.
- Ésotérisme, gnoses & imaginaire symbolique: Mélanges offerts à Antoine Faivre. Co-edited with Richard Caron, Wouter Hanegraaff, and Jean-Louis Vieillard-Baron. Leuven, Belgium: Peeters, 2001.
- John Michell, Confessions of a Radical Traditionalist. Waterbury Center, Vermont: Dominion, 2005.
- Petrus Talemarianus, Natural Architecture, translated by Ariel Godwin. Sacred Science Institute, 2006.
- The Starlight Years: Love and War at Kelmscott Manor, 1940–1948 – The Paintings, Drawings and Writings of Edward and Stephani Scott-Snell/Godwin. Stanbridge, Dorset: Dovecote Press, 2015.

=== Books translated ===
- Werner Walcker-Meyer, The Roman Organ of Aquincum. Ludwigsburg, Germany: Musikwissenschaftliches Verlagsgesellschaft, 1972.
- Salomon Trismosin, Splendor Solis. Edinburgh: Magnum Opus Hermetic Sourceworks, 1981; Grand Rapids, Michigan: Phanes Press. 1991. Another version: Splendor Solis: Harley Ms. 3469. Barcelona: Moleiro, 2011, 53–69.
- René Guénon, The Multiple States of Being. Burdett, New York: Larson Publications, 1984.
- Antoine Fabre d'Olivet, The Secret Lore of Music. Rochester, Vermont: Inner Traditions, 1988. Originally entitled Music Explained as Science and Art.
- Johann Valentin Andreae, The Chemical Wedding of Christian Rosenkreutz. Grand Rapids, Michigan: Phanes Press, 1991. Reissued in Rosicrucian Trilogy: The Three Original Rosicrucian Documents in New English Translations: Red Wheel/Weiser, 2016. Godwin's contribution is one of the three translations.
- Antoine Faivre, The Eternal Hermes. Grand Rapids, Michigan: Phanes Press, 1994.
- Francesco Colonna, Hypnerotomachia Poliphili: The Strife of Love in a Dream. London & New York: Thames & Hudson, 1999, and re-editions.
- Julius Evola, Ride the Tiger. Co-translated with Constance Fontana. Rochester, Vermont: Inner Traditions, 2003.
- Hans Kayser, Textbook of Harmonics. Co-translated with Ariel Godwin. Sacred Science Institute, 2006
- Marco Baistrocchi, Agarttha: A Guenonian Manipulation? Fullerton, California: Theosophical History, 2009 (series: Theosophical History Occasional Papers, No. XII).
- Julius Evola and the UR Group, Introduction to Magic, Volume II: The Path of Initiatic Wisdom. Rochester, Vermont: Inner Traditions, 2019.

=== Composition ===
- Six Suites for Harpsichord
- "Epistle to Harmodius", part song (text by Stephani Godwin); Musical Times supplement, October 1966
