= Guido Mina di Sospiro =

Italian writer

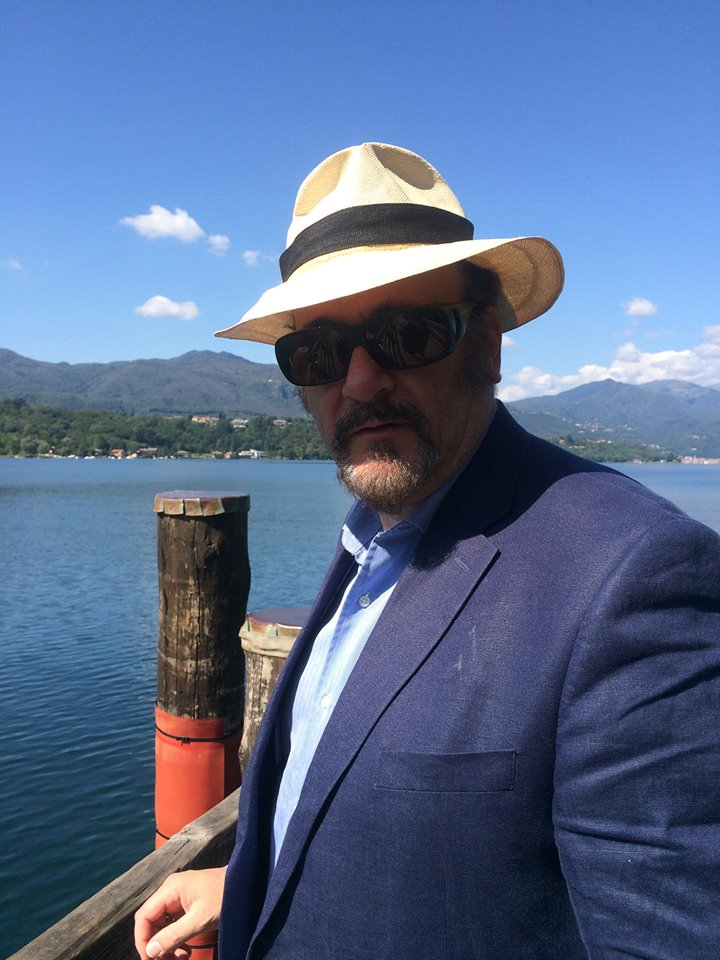
- Born: Buenos Aires, Argentina
- Education: University of Pavia; University of Southern California
- Occupations: Novelist, nonfiction writer, essayist
- Writing career
- Period: 2000–present
- Genres: Thriller, narrative nonfiction, memoirs, nonfiction
- Website: www.guido-mina-di-sospiro.com

Guido Mina di Sospiro is an Argentine-born novelist, essayist, and author of narrative nonfiction.

== Early life and education ==
Guido Mina di Sospiro was born in Buenos Aires, Argentina, into an ancient Italian family, which relocated to Italy three months after his birth. He was raised in Milan, and has been living in the United States since the 1980s, currently near Washington, D.C.

He was educated at the University of Pavia, and later at the USC School of Cinema-Television, now known as USC School of Cinematic Arts, at The University of Southern California.

== Writing career ==
Mina di Sospiro began as a music critic, by writing for Ritmo, Italy's oldest jazz periodical (1945), and then, as a correspondent from Los Angeles, for the music and cinema magazines Tutti Frutti and Elaste, respectively Italian and German. While still living in Italy, he wrote and directed the feature film Heroes and Villains, first shown at the Cineteca Italiana (Italian Cinémathèque), in Milan, in 1979; in Los Angeles, he wrote and directed the short film If I Could Do It All Over Again, I'D Do It All Over You, which premiered at the 32nd Berlin Film Festival, in 1982.

=== The Story of Yew ===
Mina di Sospiro's novel The Story of Yew, the memoirs of a two-thousand-year-old female yew tree, was inspired by the yew that grows in the cloister of Muckross Abbey, near Killarney, in Ireland. Botanist and dendrologist Alan Mitchell opined that "As a blend of science and imaginative fiction, this is a remarkable book, far removed from 'science-fiction' as normally understood. It deals with the real world in an inventive way without putting a foot wrong.

The book has been translated into many languages, as has From the River, the memoirs of a mighty river.

=== The Forbidden Book ===
Mina di Sospiro has co-authored The Forbidden Book with Joscelyn Godwin, the noted scholar of western esoteric tradition. The novel deals with the incendiary reality of radical Islamic terrorism, with an attack first on Italian and then on Spanish soil, while trying to analyze, and then put to use by harnessing its alleged powers, a real book of 1603, written by Cesare Della Riviera, entitled Il Mondo magico de gli heroi (The Magical World of the Heroes). It is a very mysterious treatise of alchemy that supposedly teaches how to attain the Tree of Life and make a man into a god. In the novel, the Riviera family possesses a secret, annotated edition that gives specific instructions on magical techniques and sexual alchemy.

=== The Metaphysics of Ping-Pong ===
On his own, the author has publishedThe Metaphysics of Ping-Pong in 2013, of which Publishers Weekly states that it "can constitute a perfect introduction to the vast history of humankind's quest for philosophical clarity".

=== Leeward and Windward ===
A romance of the high seas that toys with the tropes of conventional fiction as a pretext for a daring alchemical exploration of the coniunctio oppositorum. Philosopher Maurizio Ferraris has likened it to Voltaire's Candide. In its Italian edition as Sottovento e sopravvento the novel has garnered rave reviews.

=== Forbidden Fruits ===
The second occult novel co-authored with Joscelyn Godwin. In Dennis McKenna's words: "A wild tale of adventure and intrigue involving a 20,000 year old secret entheogen sequestered in a golden pomegranate, recovered from the ocean depths off the coast of Malta. The discovery quickly spins off into a fast-paced story, weaving together ancient rites, secret cults, alchemical transformations, shamanic shenanigans, and ruthless, very bad people."

== Magazines ==
He contributes to the web magazine Reality Sandwich to the literary magazine and journal of cultural criticism New English Review, to New Dawn Magazine, to the independent Italian online newspaper Linkiesta and to the "adventurous" literary web magazine Pangea.

== Translations ==
His books have been translated into Bulgarian, Danish, Dutch, French, Greek, Italian, Korean, Polish, Romanian, Russian, Spanish, Thai and Turkish.
