= Kelmscott Manor =

Manor house in West Oxfordshire, England

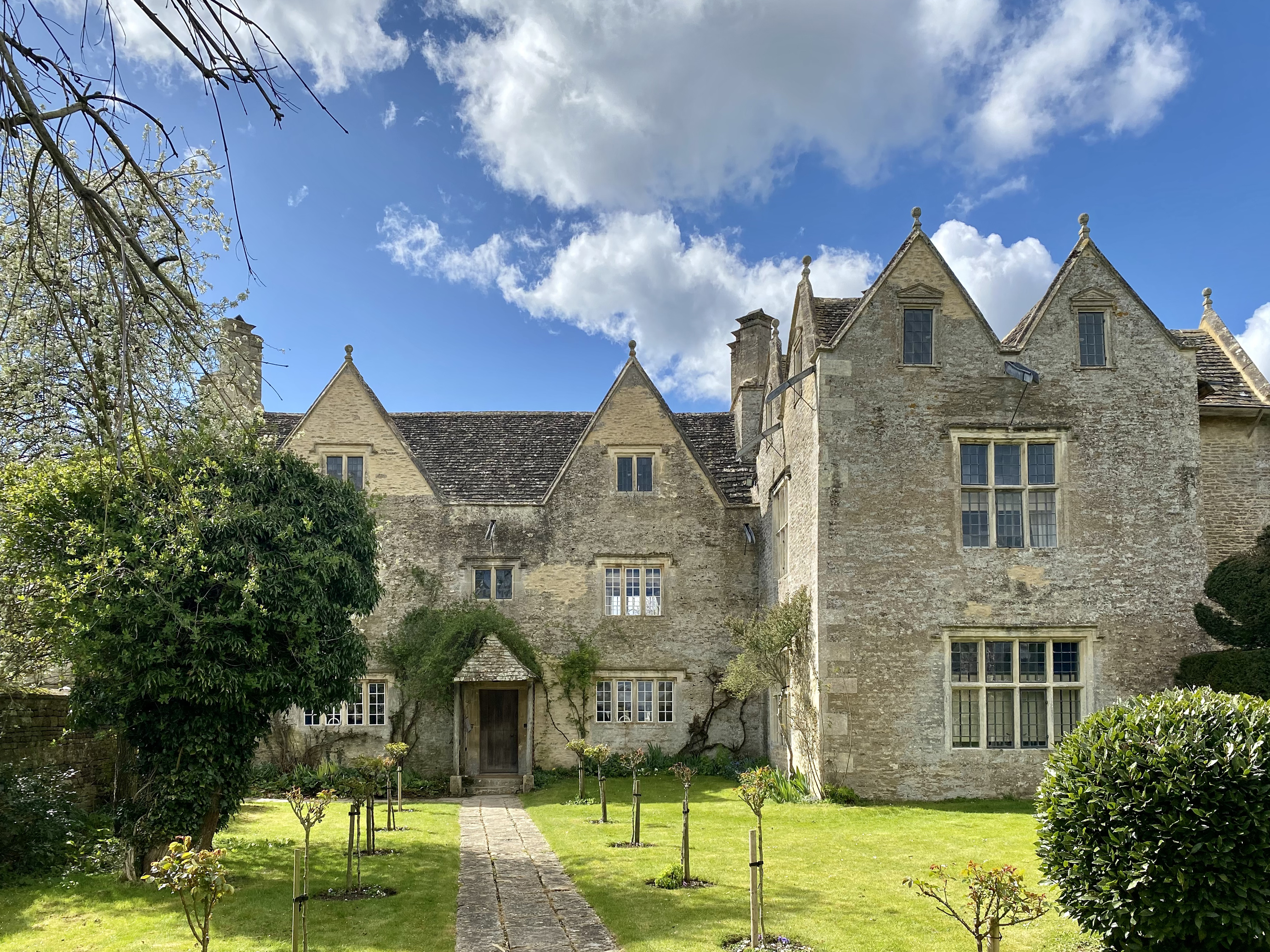
- Kelmscott Manor

- Location within Oxfordshire
- 51°41′17″N 1°38′18″W
- Type: Manor House
- Location: Kelmscott
- OS grid reference: SU 25096 98888

History
- Built: 1570

Site notes
- Area: West Oxfordshire
- Owner: Society of Antiquaries of London

Listed Building – Grade I
- Official name: Kelmscott Manor
- Designated: 12 September 1955
- Reference no.: 1199373

Listed Building – Grade II
- Official name: Garden wall, attached summerhouse and privy at Kelmscott Manor
- Designated: 30 Mar 1989
- Reference no.: 1053381

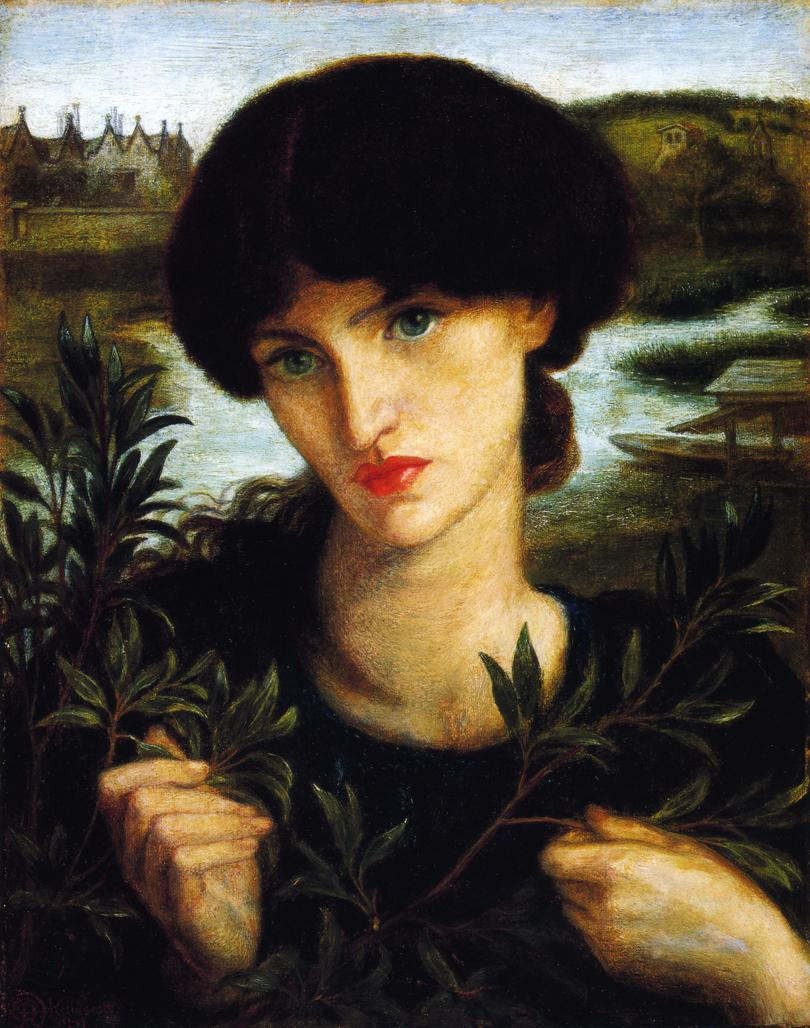
The painting Water Willow with Kelmscott Manor in the background

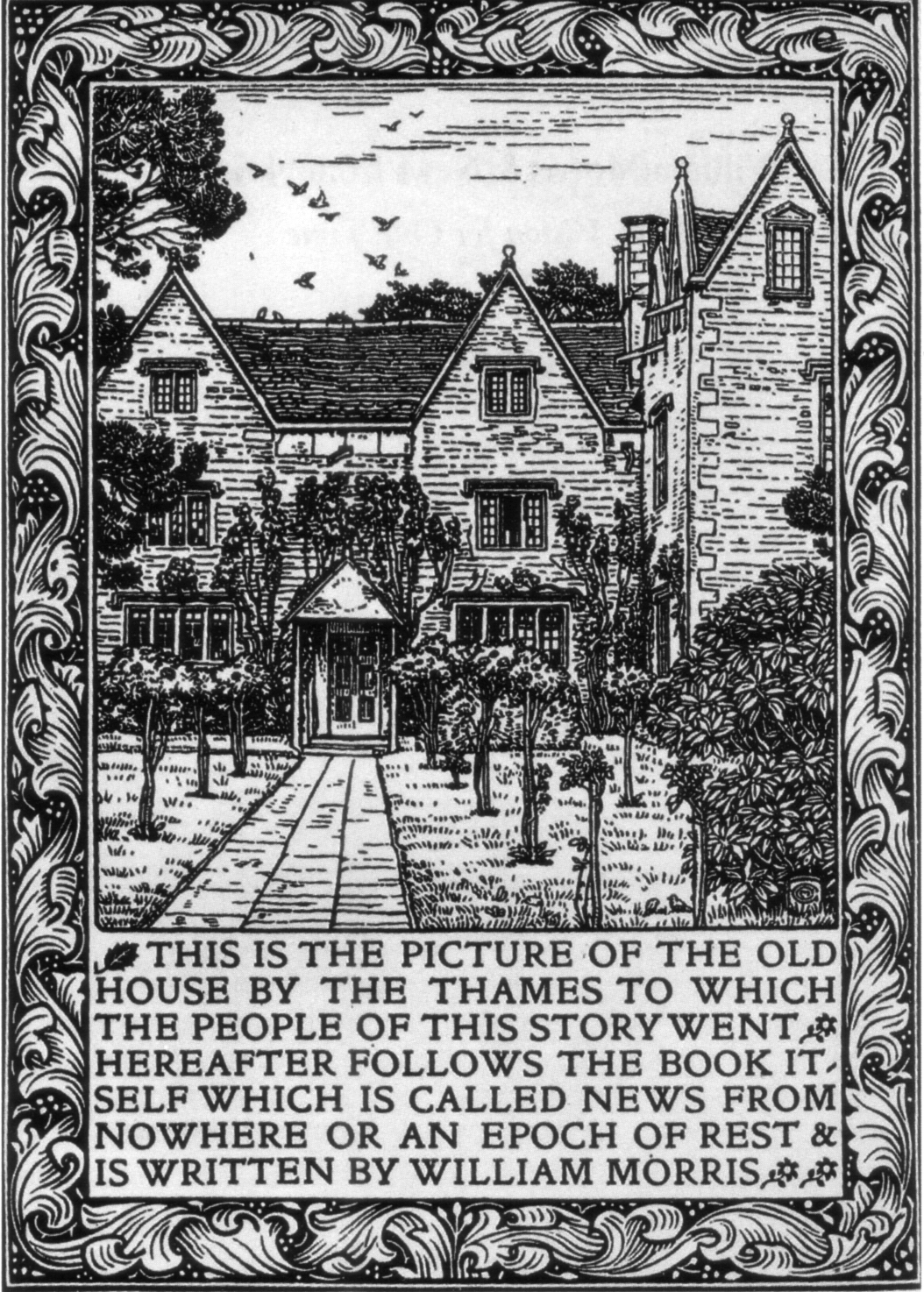
The Manor in News from Nowhere

Kelmscott Manor is a limestone manor house in the Cotswolds village of Kelmscott, in West Oxfordshire, southern England, close to the River Thames. It dates from around 1570, with a late 17th-century wing, and is listed Grade I on the National Heritage List for England. The house was the country home of the writer, designer and socialist William Morris from 1871 until his death in 1896.

== History 1570 to 1870 ==
The house was built by local farmer Thomas Turner and remained in the family for many generations. After George Turner died in 1734, the house was let out. The house was originally called Lower House, but became Kelmscott Manor when James Turner (d.1870) purchased 53½ acres of manorial land together with the lordship in 1864. After James died the manor passed to his nephew, Charles Hobbs, who let out the property.

== William Morris and family ==
Kelmscott Manor was the country home of the writer, designer and socialist William Morris from 1871 until his death in 1896. Today it is owned by the Society of Antiquaries of London, and is open to the public on Thursdays, Fridays and Saturdays during the summer.

Morris drew great inspiration from the unspoilt authenticity of the house's architecture and craftsmanship, and its organic relationship with its setting, especially its garden. The Manor is featured in Morris' work News from Nowhere. It also appears in the background of Water Willow, a portrait of his wife, Jane Morris, painted by Dante Gabriel Rossetti in 1871.

After William Morris's death in 1896, the Manor continued to be occupied by his widow, Jane Morris (who purchased it in 1913) and later, his daughters Jenny and May. Jenny died in 1935 and May in 1938. She bequeathed the house to Oxford University, on the basis the contents were preserved and the public were granted access. The university were unwilling to preserve the house as 'a museum piece' and passed the house and land to the Society of Antiquaries in 1962.

== Wartime ==
The first permanent residents to live in the Manor after the Morris family were the artists Edward and Stephanie Scott-Godwin, who were friends of May Morris. They lived there from 1940 until 1948, publishing a book on William Morris during that time with their own illustrations. According to Simon Poë this period marked "a transitional moment in the history of the house, between its Victorian heyday and its present incarnation as a heritage site and visitor attraction".

== 21st century ==
The manor was in a precarious state of decay when passed to The Society and much of the 1960s work was to make sure that the manor house did not deteriorate further. Most of the main roof beams were rotten which meant that a lot of the structure needed to be replaced. Internal walls and floors were strengthened and a new porch added to the North entrance. The associated barns were purchased by the Society in the 1970s and converted into a shop and tearoom.

The internal décor today is substantially that of Morris, and includes many of his famous textile patterns as well as much of his furniture. Visitors can explore all three floors of the manor, including the attic spaces which would originally have been used by farm labourers. Morris's bedroom contains many of his original books, and a collection of Dürer prints. Other rooms display furniture from Red House in Bexleyheath, Kelmscott House in Hammersmith and other family homes. There are also further works by Rossetti, Sir Edward Burne-Jones, and Pieter Brueghel the Younger.

The manor was reopened in April 2022 after a major restoration project undertaken by the Society. The work, funded by grants totalling £6m from the National Lottery Heritage Fund and the Kelmscott: Past Present and Future campaign, has seen extensive work undertaken to the structure of the house, as well as renovation of the interior. The manor is a Grade I listed building. The manor's annual visitorship is 26,000.

== Garden ==
The garden includes many old trees, including a very old black mulberry at the rear of the house. The front garden is walled with a summer house in one corner, and both the wall and the summerhouse are Grade II listed. The front garden contains many standard roses. Although part of the original orchard has been removed to make a small car park, many fruit trees have been left intact.

William Morris named his London residence "Kelmscott House" and the private press that he founded "the Kelmscott Press" after Kelmscott. He was buried in the village churchyard in a tomb designed by his friend and colleague Philip Webb.

== See also ==
- Arts and Crafts movement
- Fasnacloich, a country house in Harrisville, New Hampshire, said to be based on Kelmscott Manor
