= Great Mongol Shahnameh =

Persian style illustrated manuscript

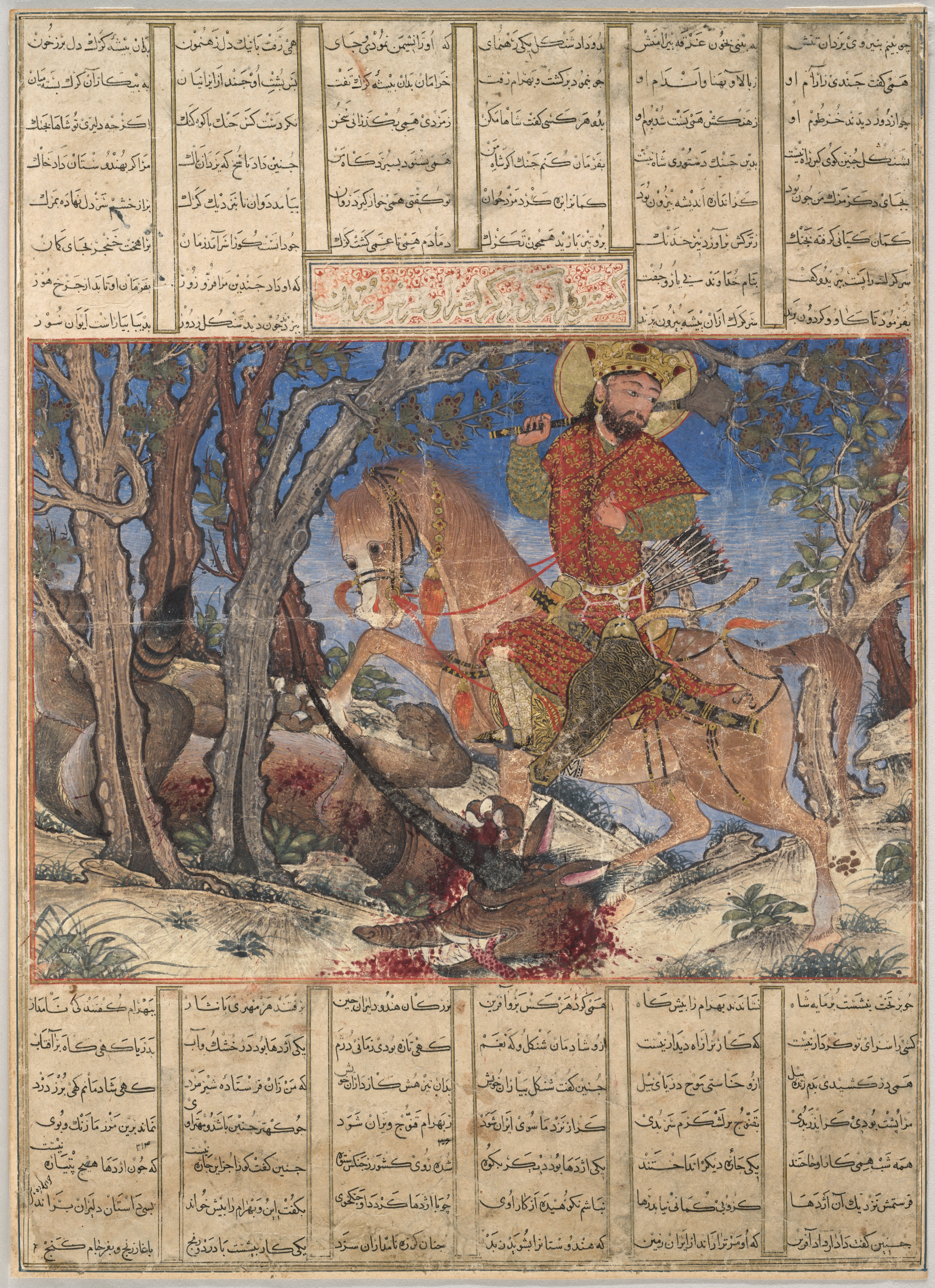
Bahram Gur killing a wolf, Harvard University Art Museum

The Great Mongol Shahnameh (Persian: شاهنامه بزرگ ایلخانی) also known as the Demotte Shahnameh or Great Ilkhanid Shahnama, is an illustrated manuscript of the Shahnameh, the national epic of Greater Iran, probably dating to the 1330s. In its original form, which has not been recorded, it was probably planned to consist of about 280 folios with 190 illustrations, bound in two volumes, although it is thought it was never completed. It is the largest early book in the tradition of the Persian miniature, in which it is "the most magnificent manuscript of the fourteenth century", "supremely ambitious, almost awe-inspiring", and "has received almost universal acclaim for the emotional intensity, eclectic style, artistic mastery and grandeur of its illustrations".

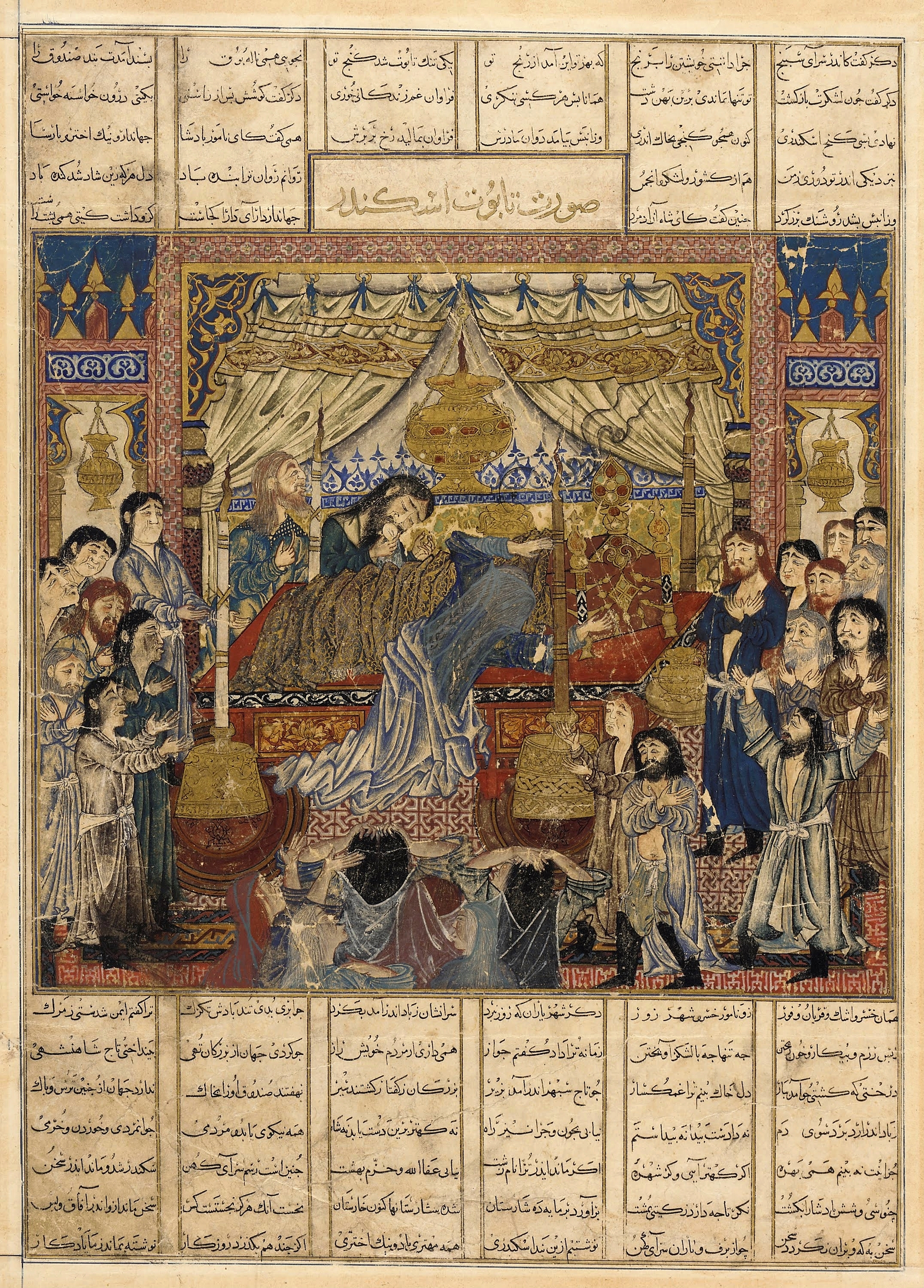
Mourning the dead Iskandar (Alexander the Great), Freer Gallery of Art

It was produced in the context of the Il-khanid court ruling Persia (modern day Iran) as part of the Mongol Empire, about a century after their conquest, and just as the dynasty was about to collapse. It remained in Persia until the early 20th century, when it was broken up in Europe by the dealer George Demotte, and now exists as 57 individual pages, many significantly tampered with, in a number of collections around the world.

== Miniatures ==
Like other Persian manuscripts, it uses paper. Excluding blank margins, the pages are 41 by 29 cm, with the text in six columns of 31 lines where not interrupted by the miniatures. These mostly take the full width of the page, and are placed at various heights within it. None are full page. Some miniatures use irregular "stepped" shapes to suit the subject. Given the history of the manuscript (see below), the usual system of numbering by folios cannot be applied.

The style, technique and artistic quality of the miniatures are highly variable; it has been suggested that different artists were responsible for them, but attempts to assign the miniatures to different hands have not achieved consensus. There seems to be experimentation in several respects. Some miniatures are paintings in ink lines and coloured washes, others use opaque watercolour, in a range of palettes. Some pigments have not lasted well. The miniatures have elements derived from both Chinese and (less often) Western traditions; for example the mourners of Iskandar draw from Christian depictions of the Lamentation of Christ, and reminiscences of several other standard scenes from the Life of Christ in art appear in other miniatures. Even costumes are highly variable: 37 styles of hat have been found, and 8 of lapels.

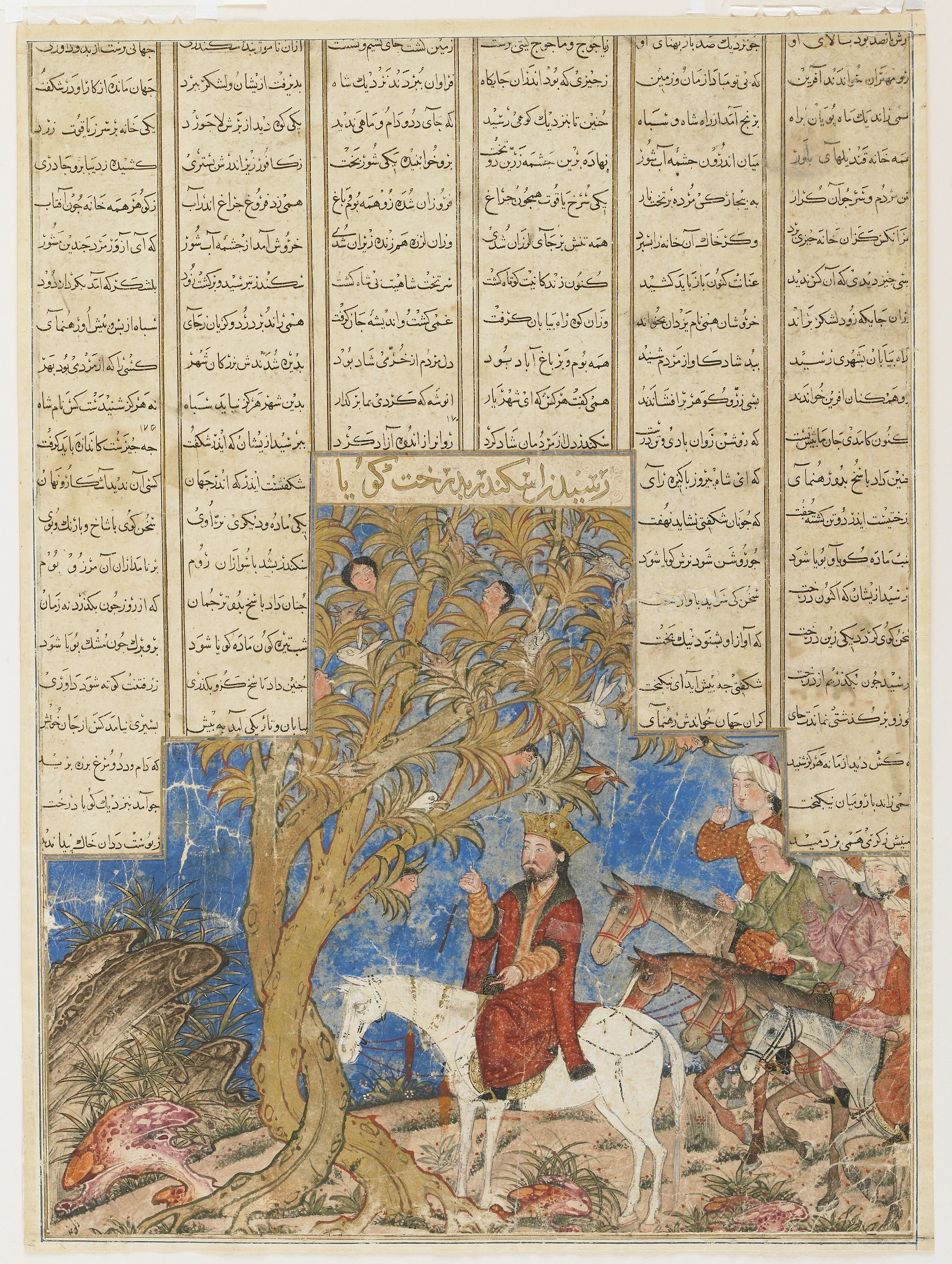
Iskandar (Alexander the Great) at the Talking Tree, which foretells his death. Freer Gallery of Art

From the vast range of potential moments to illustrate in the Shahnameh, and even allowing for the limited proportion that have survived, the illustrations show unusual choices. The story of Iskandar, a Persianized version of Alexander the Great, is very heavily illustrated, while the longer story of Rustam much less so. Themes given emphasis by the choices of what to illustrate include "the enthronement of minor kings, dynastic legitimacy, and the role of women as kingmakers", as well as scenes of murder and mourning. These choices are usually taken as reflecting contemporary political events, including "tensions between the Il-khanid dynasty and Persian subjects", and the Black Death, which was ravaging Persia in these years. They have been described as "often doom-laden".

Borrowings from Chinese art, in the shape of gnarled trees, round-topped wave-like rocks and tightly curling strips of cloud, dominate the landscapes and skies. In many images, large main figures dominate the composition in a way unusual in Persian miniatures, though common in the West. In Chinese art, there were large main figures, but these were not combined with landscape painting, as they are here. The display of emotion by figures is also unusual; the convention for depicting grief is borrowed from Christian art. Kings often have halos.

As regards their shape, 29 are horizontal rectangles, 8 vertical ones, and 12 squares, giving a total of 49 rectangular images. Stepped images total nine, with 5 symmetrical and four not (so 58 in total).

== Background ==
The Shahnameh, an epic poem of about 60,000 couplets, was completed in 1010 by Ferdowsi. It covers the pre-Islamic history of Persia, beginning in pure legend, but by the final Sassanid kings giving a reasonable accurate historical account, mixed in with romantic stories. It represented an assertion of Persian national identity, begun during the Iranian Intermezzo after the Arab Abbasid Caliphate had lost effective control of Persia. By the time it was finished the Turkic Ghaznavids had taken over.

The Mongol Empire had begun to conquer Persia in 1219, and completed it in the 1250s, founding the sub-dynasty and state known as the Ilkhanate, which as well as Persia included modern Iraq and parts of Afghanistan, Turkey and several other countries (especially parts of the former Soviet Union). The Mongols initially mostly continued a nomadic lifestyle and lived separately from their Persian subjects, but increasingly settled in Persian cities and developed an understanding of Persianate culture, as well as converting to Islam, which happened rapidly, at least among the elite, after the newly-converted Ghazan reached the throne in 1295. However, the Mongols remained largely culturally distinct at the time the Great Mongol Shahnameh was created.

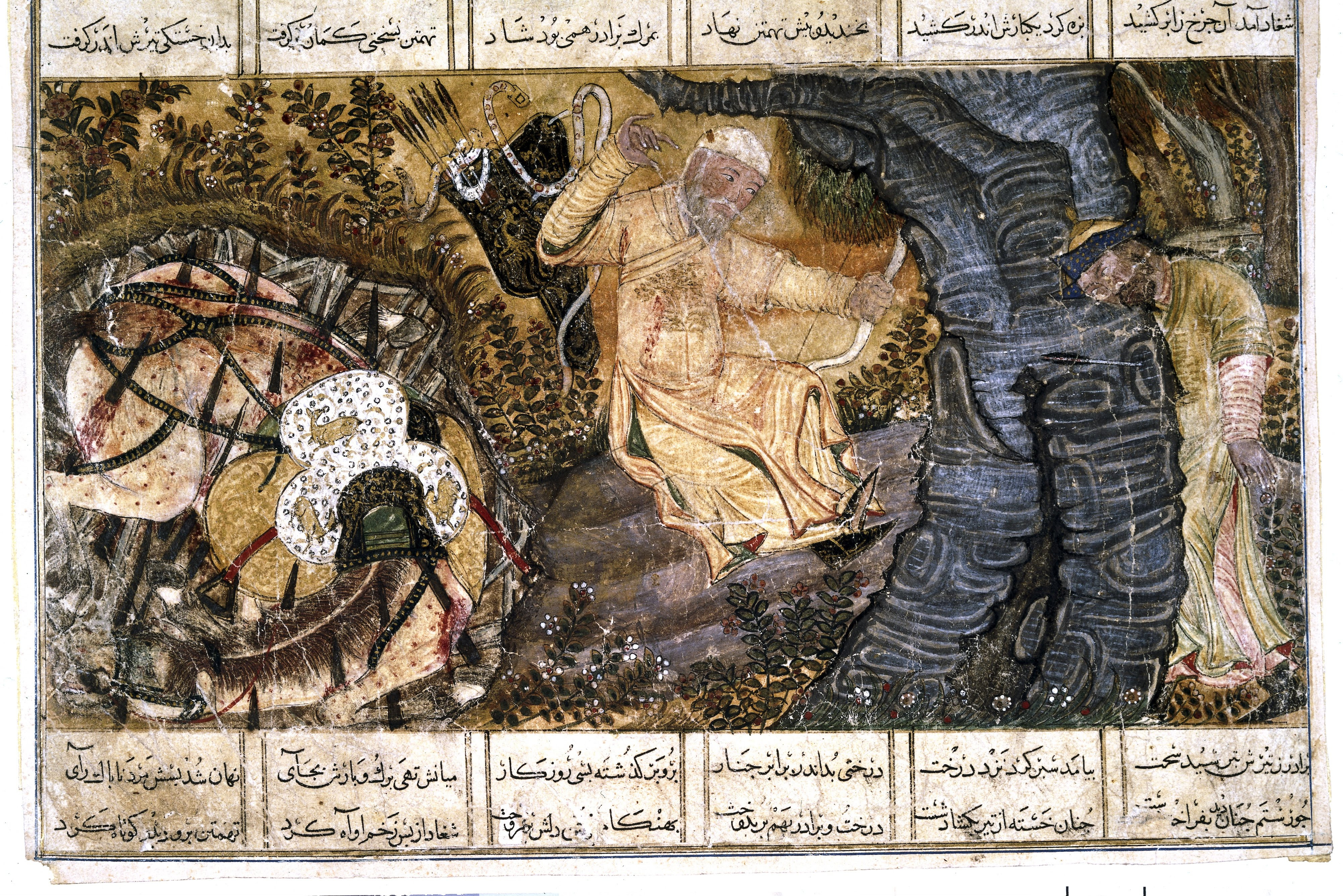
The death of the hero Rustam and his horse Rakhsh; as he dies Rustam shoots his treacherous brother through the tree he hides behind. British Museum

Tiles with verses from the Shahnameh have been found in a Mongol palace, dating from about 1280. It is clear from literary references that there was a pre-Islamic tradition of illustrating stories later included in the Shahnameh in wall-paintings and probably other media, and some Islamic ceramics may well show such scenes. But there are no survivals, or mentions, of illustrated books of the Shahnameh before the 14th century, and the ten surviving manuscripts from between 1300 and 1350 all appear to have been produced for Mongols. Possibly a relative unfamiliarity with the Persian language and the text may have encouraged adding pictures.

These include three "small" Shahnamehs, perhaps the earliest, whose small size (text and image area of 250 x 170 mm in a typical example) may have suited nomadic owners, and four manuscripts for the semi-independent Injuid rulers of Shiraz and Isfahan in the south-west. This latter group, probably all later than the Great Mongol Shahnameh, are influenced by it, though much less complex in style.

The books had a political purpose, which is reflected in the choice of incidents to illustrate: "in such works, the hitherto stubbornly alien rulers of Iran were expressing a new and public commitment to the religion and cultural heritage of the very lands that they themselves had devastated some two generations previously—and doing so with an urgency that suggested they were making up for lost time."

In the first decade of the 13th century the Persian Jewish vizier, Rašīd-al-Dīn was commissioned by Ghazan to continue a history of the Mongols, which he completed in 1307, and the next khan Öljaitü ordered a world history, the Jami' al-tawarikh, the earliest manuscript of which also dates to 1307. Rašīd-al-Dīn set up a scriptorium in the Tabriz suburb of Rab'-e Rashidi, where the book was researched, scribed, illustrated and bound. The intention was to produce two illustrated manuscript copies each year, one in Persian and one in Arabic, for distribution around the empire; parts of three of these survive, as well as parts of other books from the workshop. They are illustrated in a fairly consistent style, which the Great Mongol Shahnameh builds on and significantly develops. After Rašīd-al-Dīn was executed in 1318 the workshop declined or ceased, but his son Ḡīāṯ-al-Dīn Moḥammad revived it when he rose in the court in the 1330s, and the Great Mongol Shahnameh is assumed to have been created there.

== History ==
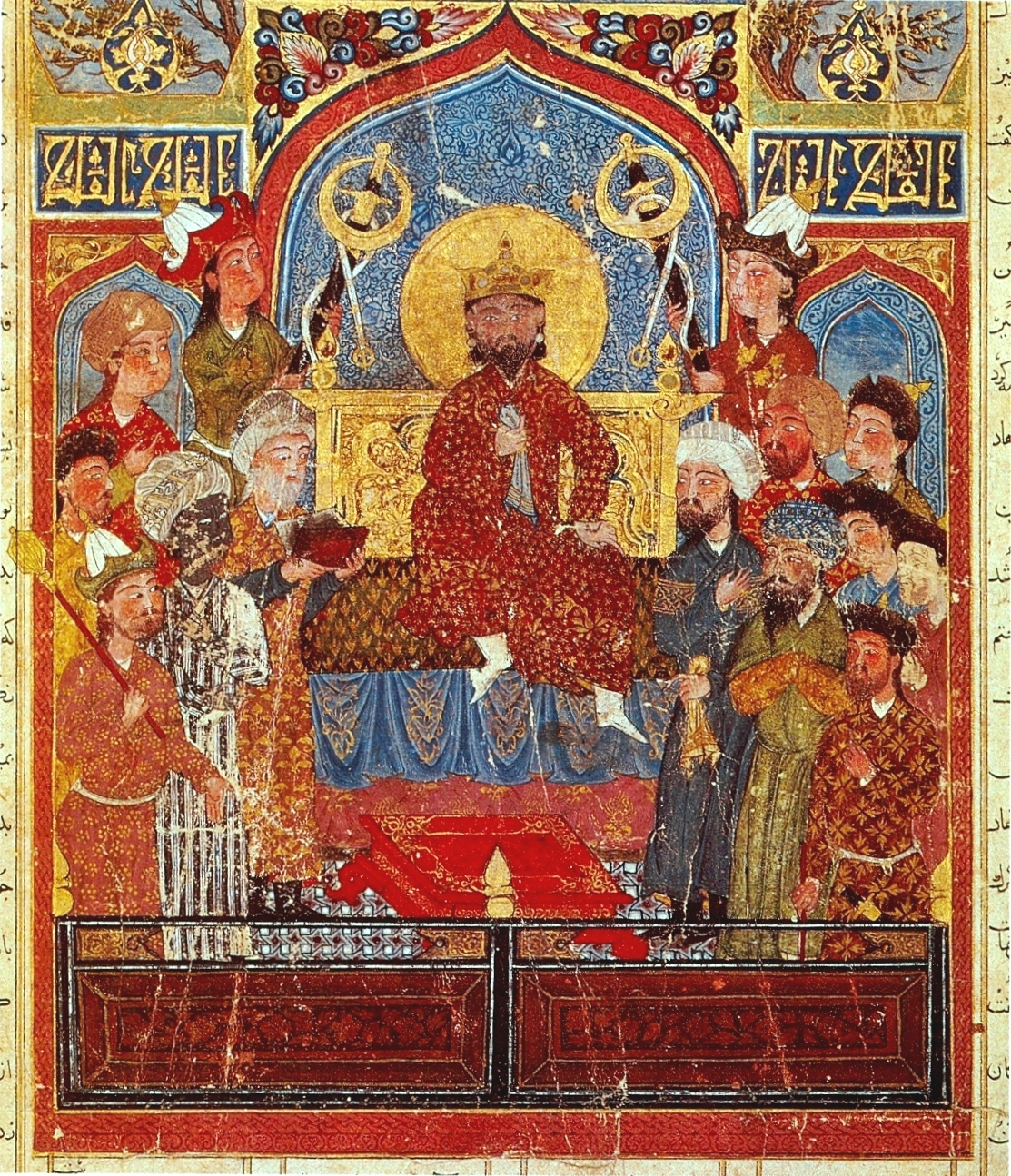
Enthroned ruler, Louvre

Ardashir and his Dastur (Councillor). Keir Collection

Any colophon with details of when the work was produced and who commissioned it, which many Persian manuscripts have, has been lost. The work has always been located to Tabriz in the late Il-khanid period, and was clearly a massive project commissioned by someone important in the court, probably with the ruler as the ultimate recipient, either through a gift or a delegated commission. Recent studies of the manuscript have been dominated by the conclusions reached at a seminar at Harvard in 1975, published in 1980 by Oleg Grabar and Sheila Blair (see Further reading below).

This proposed a short period of creation, with the start of work very precisely dated to "between November 1335 and May 1336", and a commission by Rašīd-al-Dīn’s son Ḡīāṯ-al-Dīn Moḥammad, with work on the manuscript probably brought to an end by his murder in May 1336. Both these points have been generally accepted, though the lack of evidence for either has been noted, and in particular some scholars favour a period of creation stretching over a much longer period. The main alternative initial patron proposed has been the last of the main line of Ilkhanid rulers, Abu Sa'id, who died in 1335, as did his sons, all apparently of the plague, so precipitating the splitting of the Ilkhanate into small states. If this was the case, Ḡīāṯ-al-Dīn Moḥammad might very well have still been responsible for fulfilling the commission.

The miniaturist Dust Muhammad wrote a history of Persian painting in about 1544, over 200 years later, in which he refers to an important royal Shahnameh, which he describes as "square" in format, which the Great Mongol Shahnameh is not. Nevertheless, many scholars have thought he was describing the Great Mongol Shahnameh. Dust Muhammad traced the style of painting used in his day to a painter called Ahman Musa, and described the Shahnameh as produced by a pupil of his, called Shamsuddin, for Shaikh Awais Jalayir, a ruler of the Jalayirid dynasty reigning 1356–74. If the period of creation was in fact protracted, this account might refer to the later stages of work.

The manuscript seems to have remained in Tabriz until the early 16th century, if not later, and then at some point entered the main library of the shahs, where it was photographed in the late 19th century, still bound. At this point it was extensively restored, probably at the Golestan Palace library: the folios were trimmed, remargined, and renumbered, with missing text supplemented on new paper folios, written out by Tehran calligraphers following fourteenth-century style. Many of the paintings were retouched, with occasional Persian commentary written onto them. It first appeared in Europe with Georges Demotte, a Belgian art dealer active from 1900–23 in Paris: "Demotte is said to have acquired the manuscript in Paris in about 1910; he bought it from Shemavan Malayan, brother-in-law of the well-known dealer Hagop Kevorkian, who had brought it from Tehran".

Demotte failed to raise the price he wanted for the whole manuscript from the Metropolitan Museum of Art and other potential buyers. He then separated the miniatures and sold them, after various physical interventions to increase the sale value, and without properly recording the original form of the book. Pages were pulled apart to give two sides with miniatures, and to disguise this and the resulting damage, calligraphers were hired to add new text, often from the wrong part of the work, as Demotte did not expect his new clientele of wealthy collectors to be able to read Persian. This has left the subject of some miniatures still uncertain, as the surrounding text does not match them. Scholars have been very critical of the "infamous" Demotte, and it irked many that the manuscript he treated so brutally carried his name, so the new name of "Great Mongol Shahnameh" was promoted, and has generally won acceptance.

Currently, 57 miniatures from this manuscript have been identified in museums around the world, including the Freer Gallery of Art, which has the largest group at 16 pages, Chester Beatty Library (11 folios with 7 miniatures), the Louvre (2), British Museum, Metropolitan Museum of Art (2), and museums in Berlin, Boston (2), Cleveland, Detroit, Geneva (3), Montreal, and other cities, as well as private collections including the Keir Collection of Islamic Art (4) and the Khalili Collection of Islamic Art (1)

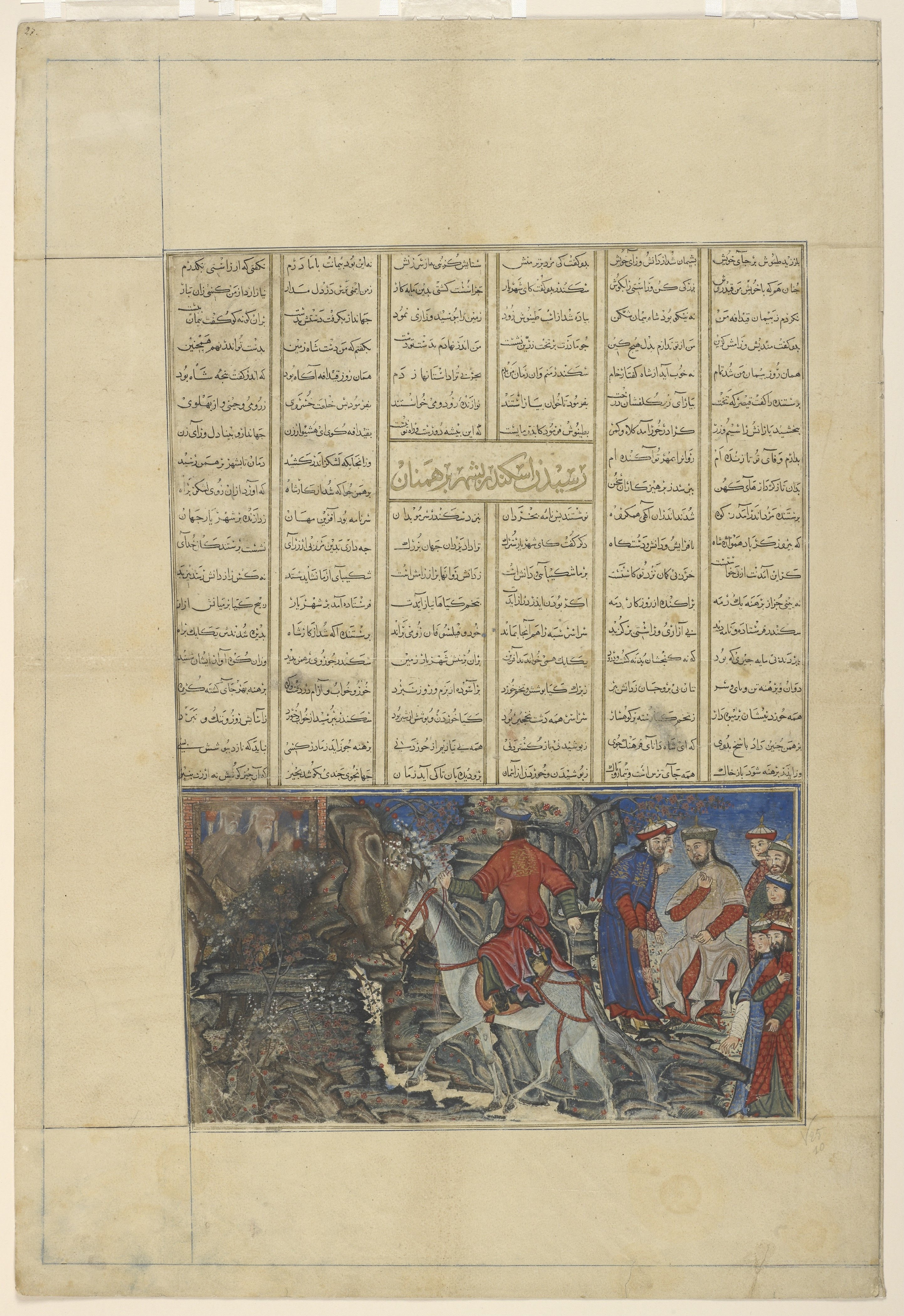
Taynush Before Iskandar and the Visit to the Brahmans, Arthur M. Sackler Gallery

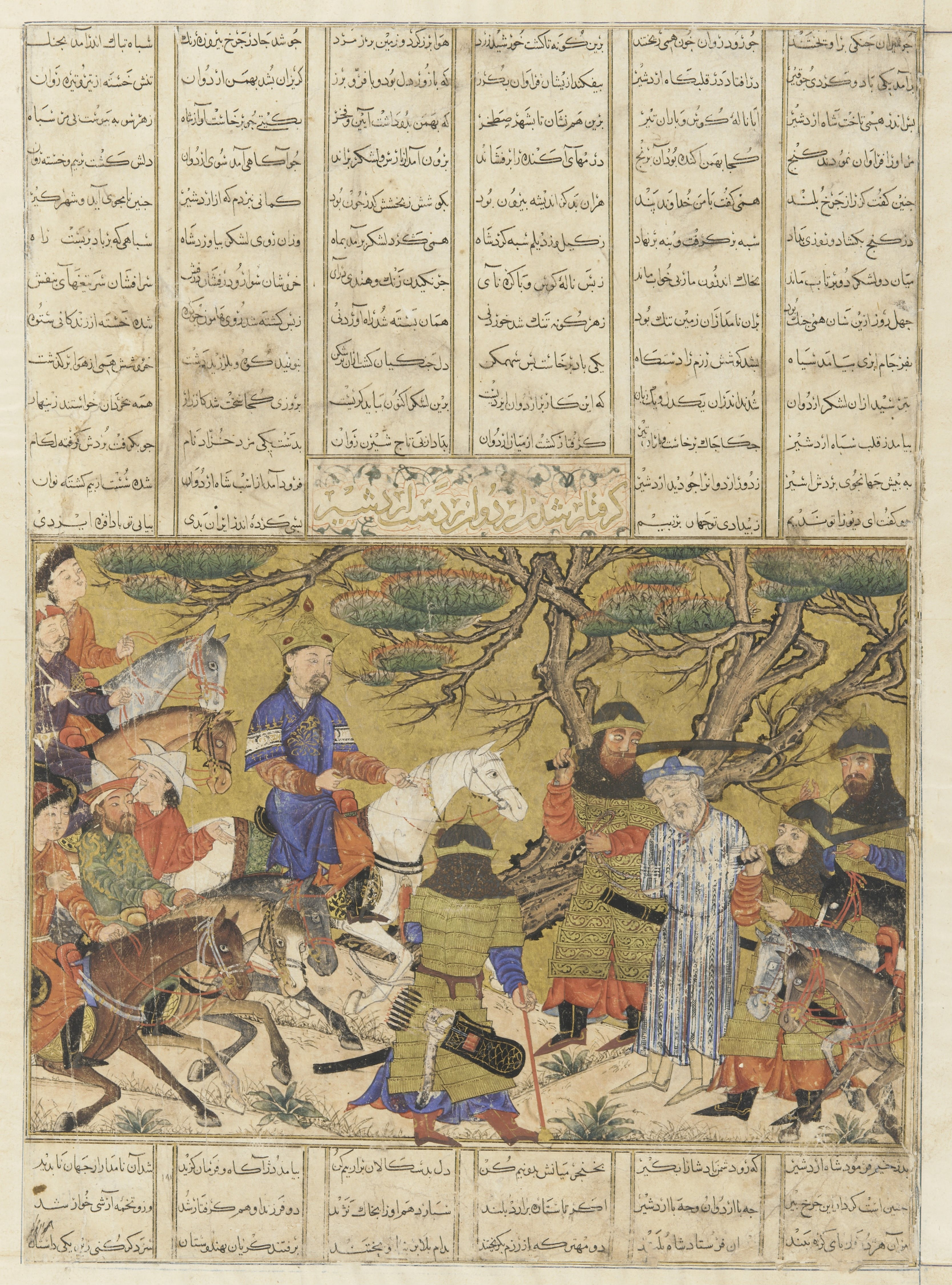
Ardashir I Captures Ardavan, Arthur M. Sackler Gallery

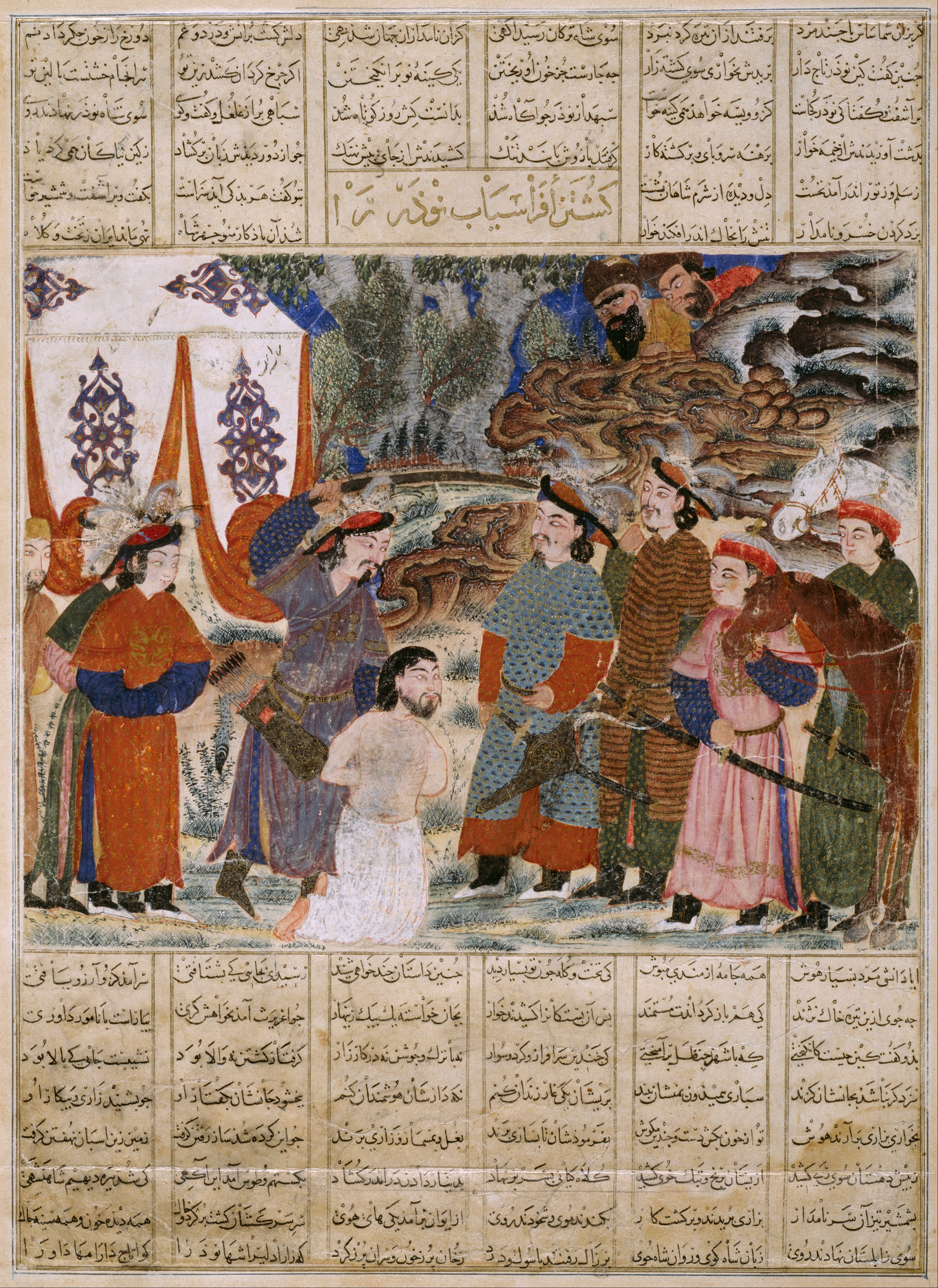
Afrasiab Killing Naudar, Nelson-Atkins Museum of Art

Anushirwan Holds a Banquet for his Minister Bozorgmehr, Cleveland Museum of Art

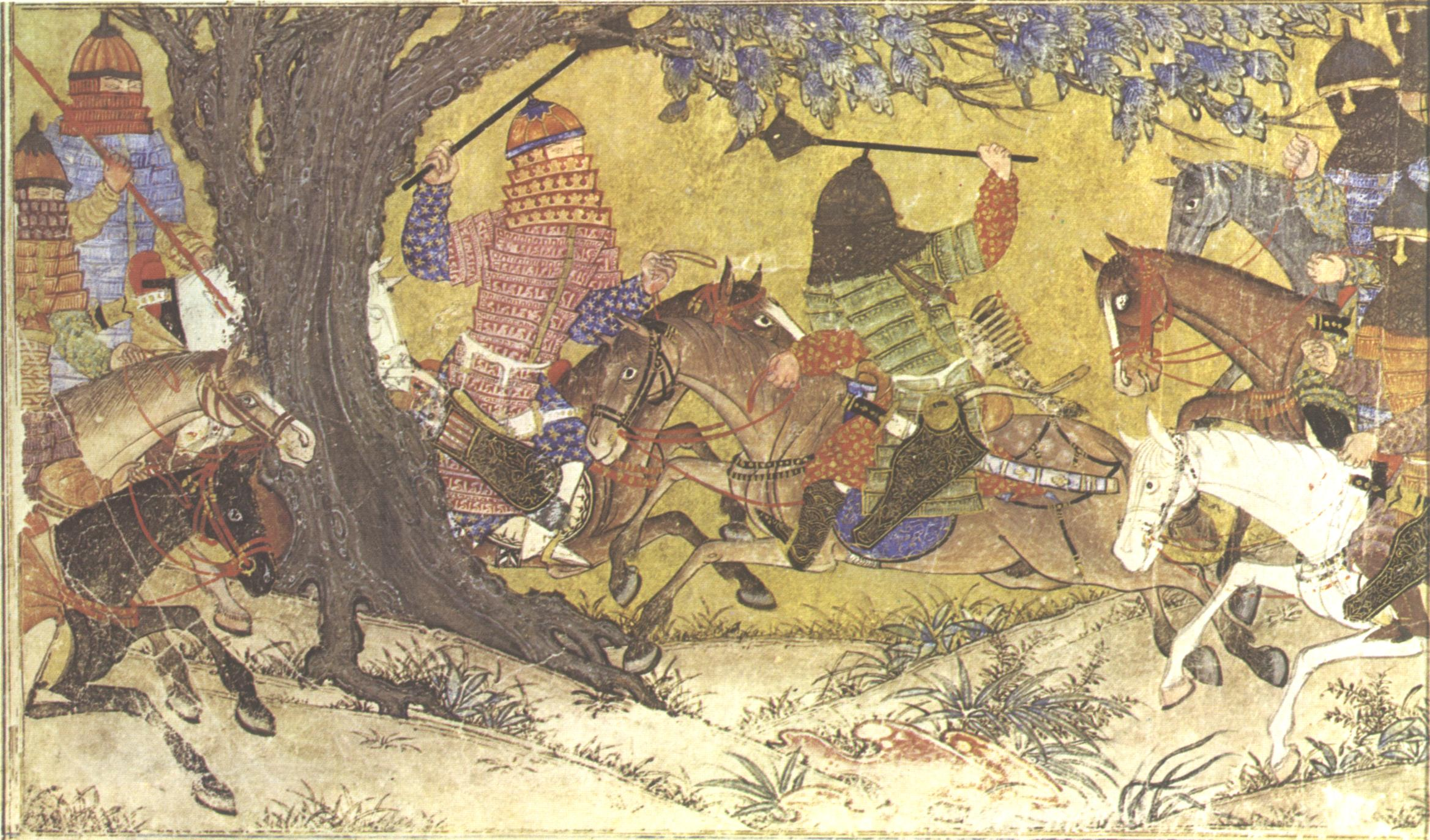
Ardashir Battles Bahman, Son of Ardavan. Detroit Institute of Arts

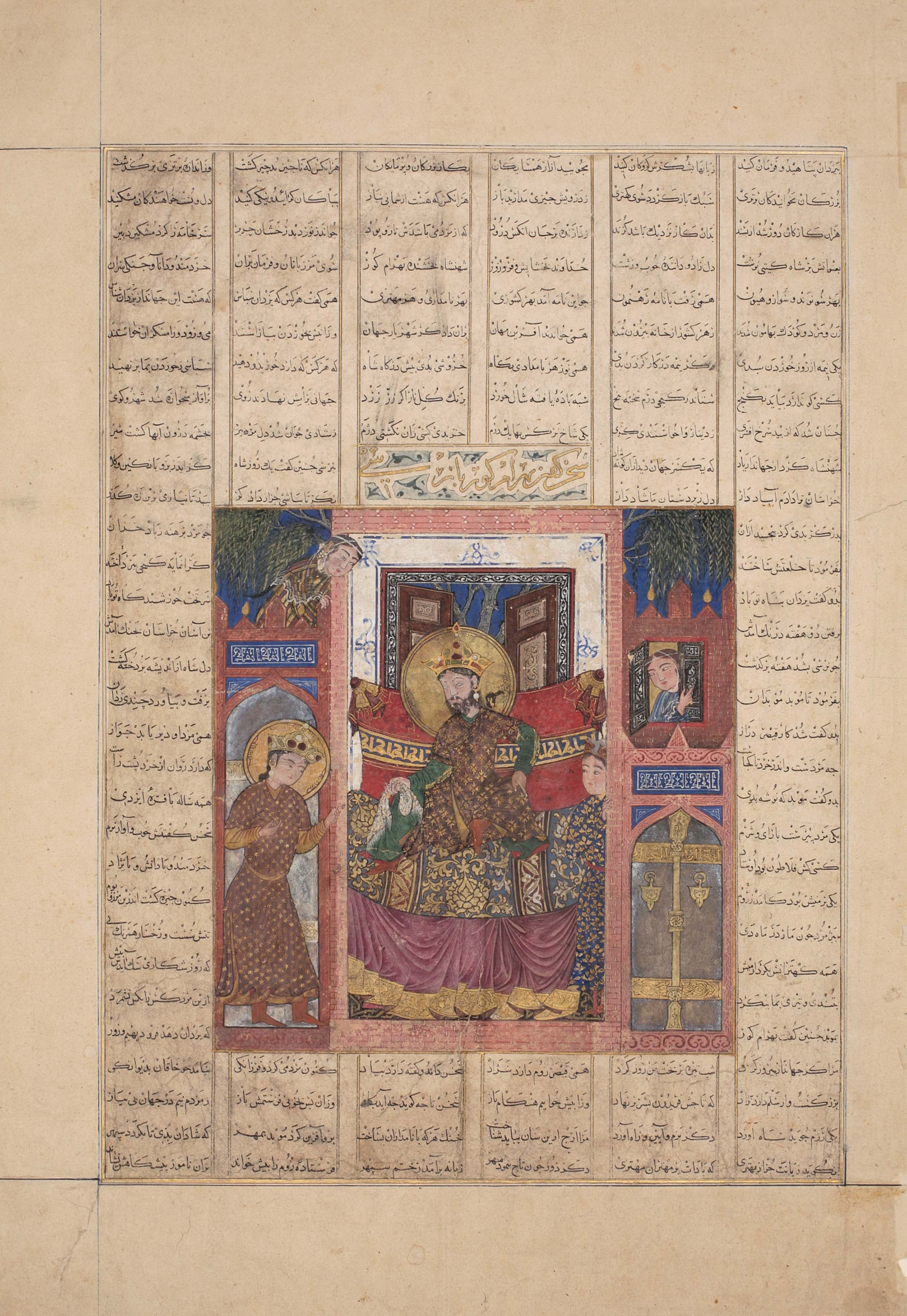
Bahram Gur Sends his Brother Narsi as Viceroy to Khurasan, Khalili Collection of Islamic Art

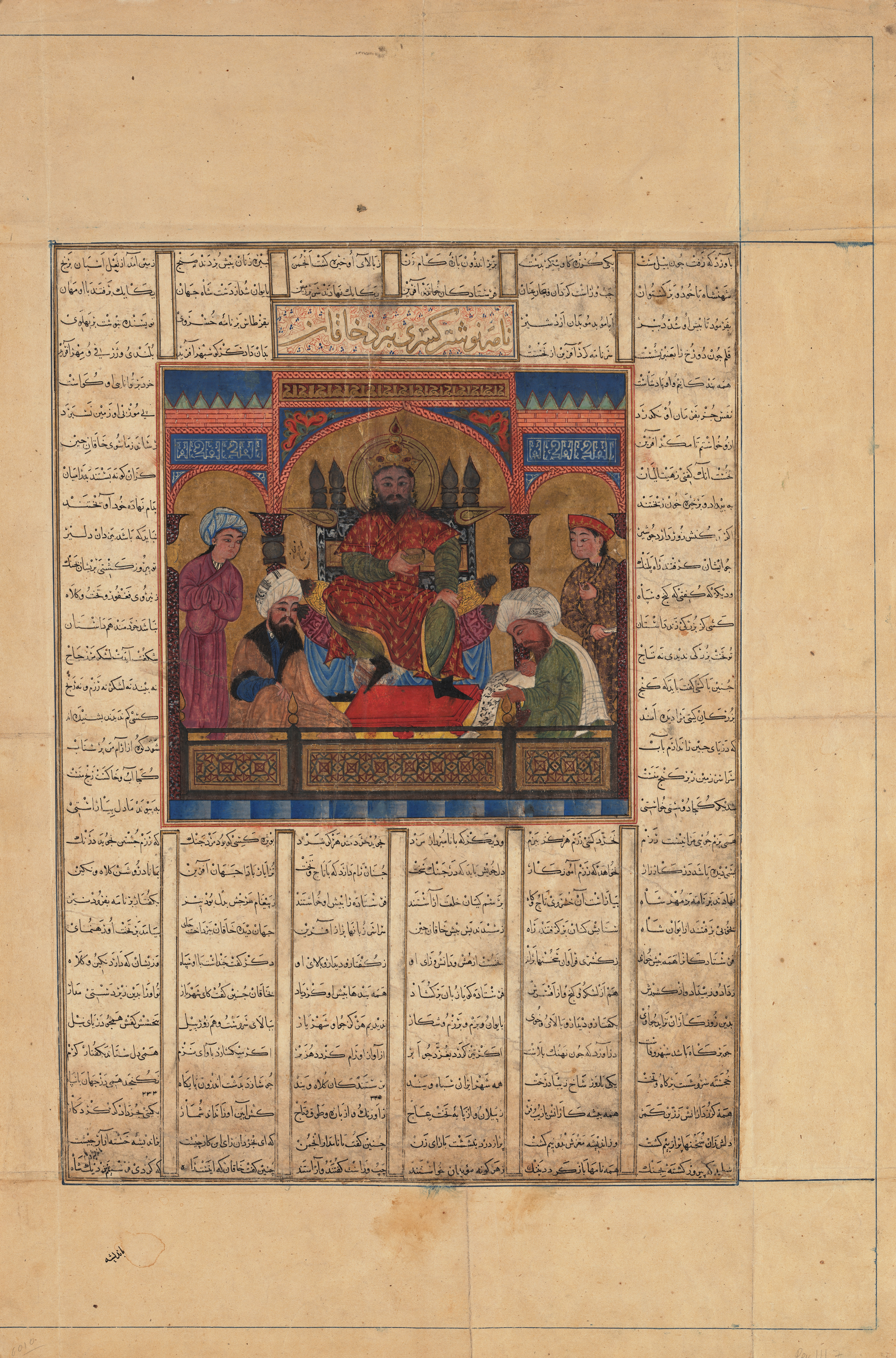
Anushirvan dictates a letter to the Khaqan of Chin, Chester Beatty Library

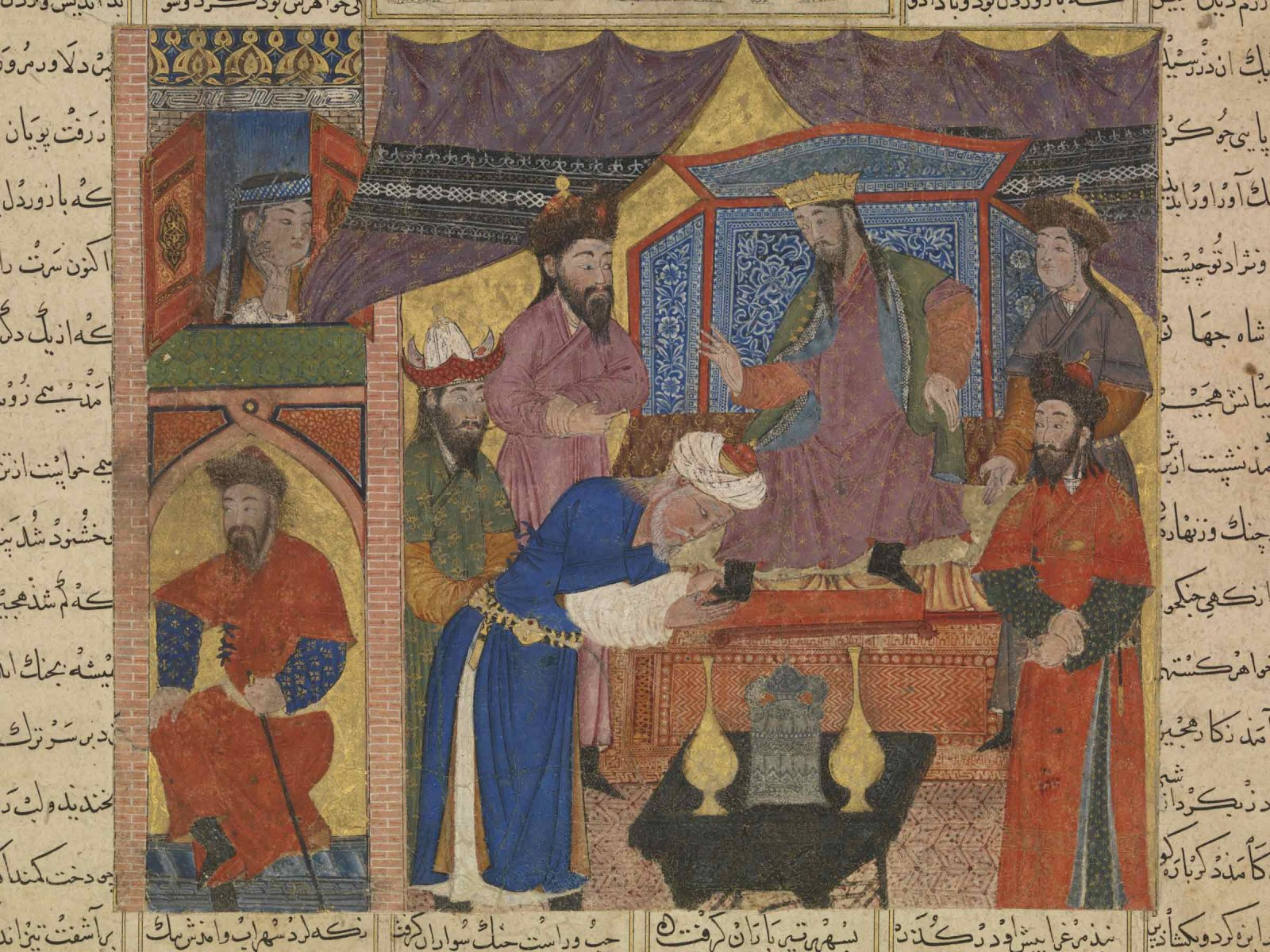
Zal meets king Manuchihr, asking for his mercy, Chester Beatty Library
