= Red Wheel/Weiser =

American occult book publisher

- Status: Active
- Founded: 1956
- Founder: Samuel Weiser
- Country of origin: United States
- Headquarters location: San Francisco, California (editorial); Newburyport, Massachusetts (sales/marketing)
- Distribution: Self-distribution (US); Georgetown Publications (Canada); Brumby Sunstate (Australia); Hay House (South Africa); Deep Books (Europe); Curreri World Services (Asia)
- Publication types: Books
- Nonfiction topics: New Age, occult
- Imprints: Career Press; Conari Books; Disinformation Books; New Page Books; Phanes Press; Red Wheel; Turning Stone Press; Weiser Books
- Official website: RedWheelWeiser.com

Red Wheel/Weiser, also known in different periods in its history as RedWheel/Weiser/Conari and Samuel Weiser, Inc., is a book publishing company with several imprints, probably the best known of which are Conari Books, Red Wheel, and Weiser Books. It is America's second-largest publisher of occult and New Age books, behind Llewellyn Worldwide, and is also one of the oldest American publishers to concentrate almost exclusively on that genre and adjacent ones (e.g. spirituality, as well as cryptids, conspiracy theories, and other fringe subjects). It publishes on average 60–75 new titles per year and maintains a large backlist, partly of books that it originally published, and partly of older, public-domain but scarce occult books.

== Imprints ==
=== Career Press ===
Career Press was founded in 1985 by Ron Fry and is focused on business books. Red Wheel/Weiser acquired Career Press in 2017.

=== Conari Books ===
This imprint was acquired in 2002. Before this, Conari Books had been a separate publisher, based in Berkeley, California, dating back to 1989. This imprint focuses on books that address sociology and parenting issues through a spiritual or New Age perspective. Mango Publishing acquired Conari from Red Wheel/Weiser in 2019.

=== Disinformation Books ===
Disinformation Books was founded in 1997 as the publishing division of Disinformation. It was acquired by Red Wheel/Weiser in 2012.

=== New Page Books ===
New Page Books was founded in 1999 as the general nonfiction imprint of Career Press.

=== Phanes Press ===
Phanes Press was an independent book publisher until acquired by Red Wheel Weiser Conari in 2004. Phanes Press was founded by David Fideler in 1985 and published books concerning "the spiritual, philosophical and cultural traditions of the Western world", and topics ranging from "alchemy to Sufism, from Gnosticism to Neoplatonism", to the traditions of the Pythagoreans. The company's publications were distributed by Words Distributing Co., which had 23 publisher clients in 2000.

As a so-called "micro-publisher", the company had published only 52 titles by 2004, when it was purchased by the then-named Red Wheel/Weiser/Conari. Reprints of Phanes titles were slated to appear under the Weiser Books imprint after the acquisition.

Among Phanes's best-selling titles were The Pythagorean Sourcebook and Awakening Osiris. Other titles published by Phanes included:

- Blackfoot Physics by F. David Peat
- The Manual of Harmonics by Nicomachus of Gerasa
- The Pagan Dream of the Renaissance by Joscelyn Godwin
- The Voice of the Earth by Theodore Roszak
- The Theology of Arithmetic by Pseudo-Iamblichus; translation, introduction, notes by Robin Waterfield; foreword by K. Critchlow, Phanes Press, 1988, ISBN 0-933999-72-0.

=== Red Wheel ===
Red Wheel was started in 2000 as a Weiser imprint for spiritually oriented and occult self-help and how-to books, and at that time the company name was changed from Samuel Weiser, Inc., to RedWheel/Weiser, with several other variations used, including Weiser, Inc.

=== Turning Stone Press ===
Turning Stone was launched in 2012. It is a self-publishing imprint, in collaboration with Hampton Roads Publishing and Hierophant Publishing.

=== Weiser Books ===
This main imprint is also the oldest. It was founded as Samuel Weiser, Inc., in 1956, a time when few other publishers were willing to tackle occult subjects, and was originally an offshoot of the New York City retailer Weiser Antiquarian Books. This imprint publishes the backlist and continues to acquire books on occultism, astrology, esoteric subjects, Eastern religions, Wicca, and related topics.

=== Quest Books ===
In 2023, they acquired Quest Books, previously owned by the Theosophical Publishing House, itself the publishing arm of the Theosophical Society in America.

== Location ==
After New York, the company was located in Boston, Massachusetts, and then in York Beach, Maine for most of its history. In 2006, the editorial department moved to San Francisco, California, and the sales and marketing department moved to Newburyport, Massachusetts.
