= George Joseph Demotte =

International art dealer (1877–1923)

- Born: 1877; Belgium
- Died: 1923 (aged 45–46); France
- Occupation: Art dealer
- Organization: Demotte Galleries
- Children: Lucien (died 1934)

George Joseph Demotte, alternatively Georges-Joseph Demotte (1877–1923) was a Belgian-born art dealer, the owner of galleries in Paris (27 rue de Berri) and New York (8 East 57th Street) specializing in the sale of medieval French art.

He has become infamous among historians of Islamic art for his treatment of the highly important Great Mongol Shahnameh or "Demotte Shahnameh". This came into Demotte's hands about 1910, when "he bought it from Shemavan Malayan, brother-in-law of the well-known dealer Hagop Kevorkian, who had brought it from Tehran".

Demotte failed to raise the price he wanted for the whole manuscript from the Metropolitan Museum of Art and other potential buyers. He then separated the miniatures and sold them, after various physical interventions to increase the sale value, and without properly recording the original form of the book. Pages were pulled apart to give two sides with miniatures, and to disguise this and the resulting damage, calligraphers were hired to add new text, often from the wrong part of the work, as Demotte did not expect his new clientele of wealthy collectors to be able to read Persian. This has left the subject of some miniatures still uncertain, as the surrounding text does not match them. Scholars have been very critical of the "infamous" Demotte, and it irked many that the manuscript he treated so brutally carried his name, so the new name of "Great Mongol Shahnameh" was promoted, and has generally won acceptance.

His portrait was painted by Henri Matisse in 1918.

In 1923 he sued his former New York agent, Jean Vigoroux, in the French courts for embezzlement, while simultaneously suing Sir Joseph Duveen for slander in the American courts, for having declared a medieval statuette that Demotte had sold a fake. Neither suit had been settled when Demotte died, accidentally shot by a friend and fellow art-dealer, Otto Wegener, while returning from a boar-hunting trip. Wegener was cleared of homicide by the French courts, but ordered to pay compensation to Demotte's family.

Demotte's galleries, estimated at the time of his death to be worth $2,000,000, passed to his seventeen-year-old son Lucien (died 1934).
