= Updike =

Updike is a surname of Dutch origin, and is a spelling variant of the Dutch Opdijk, a topographic surname meaning someone who lived on a dike. The surname has been present in North America since the settlement of New Netherland in the 17th century. Updike used to be spelled as Updyke and many other ways, but is now most commonly spelled as Updike.

People with the surname Updike or Updyke include:

- Daniel Berkeley Updike (1860–1941), American printer and historian of typography
- Daniel Updike, Attorney General of Rhode Island (1722–1732) - see List of attorneys general of Rhode Island
- David Updike (born 1957) is an American writer and academic
- Elizabeth Updike Cobblah (born 1955) is an American art teacher and ceramicist, painter, and illustrator
- Martha Ruggles Bernhard Updike (October 18, 1937 – October 9, 2023) was an American social worker and the widow of author John Updike
- Isaac Updike (born 21 March 1992) is an American track and field athlete
- James Updyke, a one-time pen name of W. R. Burnett (1899–1982), American novelist and screenwriter
- John Updike (1932–2009), American novelist, poet, short story writer, art critic, and literary critic
- Junius Marcellus Updyke, the namesake of the Junius Marcellus Updyke Farm, Virginia, on the National Register of Historic Places
- Linda Grace Hoyer Updike (1904–1989), American writer
- Mary Pennington (Updike) Weatherall, visual artist and the first wife of John Updike
- Matthew Updike, 21st century American Paralympic cyclist
- Nancy Updike, American public radio producer and writer
- Ralph E. Updike (1894–1953), a U.S. Representative from Indiana
- Wesley Updike (1900 – 1972) was an American educator, soldier, and father of author John Updike
- Sallie Updyke Mundy (born 1962), American judge
- Sarah Updike Goddard (c. 1701–1770), née Updike, American printer and a cofounder and publisher of the Providence Gazette and Country Journal

== Fictional characters ==
- In The Algerine Captive: or the Life and Adventures of Doctor Updike Underhill: Six Years a Prisoner among the Algerines, one of the first American novels, published in 1797

== See also ==
- Oudendijk (disambiguation)
- Van Dijk
