= Oudendijck =

Oudendijck is a Dutch surname. Notable people with the surname include:

- Evert Oudendijck
- Adriaen Oudendijck

== See also ==
- Oudendijk
- Updike
- Van Dijk
