= Berckheyde =

Berckheyde is a surname. Notable people with the surname include:

- Gerrit Berckheyde (1638–1698), Dutch painter
- Job Adriaenszoon Berckheyde (1630–1693), Dutch painter, brother of Gerrit
