= Ostade =

Ostade is the surname of two Dutch brothers, both of whom were painters:

- Adriaen van Ostade (1610–1685), genre painter
- Isaac van Ostade (1621–1649), genre and landscape painter
