= Auguste Corteau =

Greek writer (born 1979)

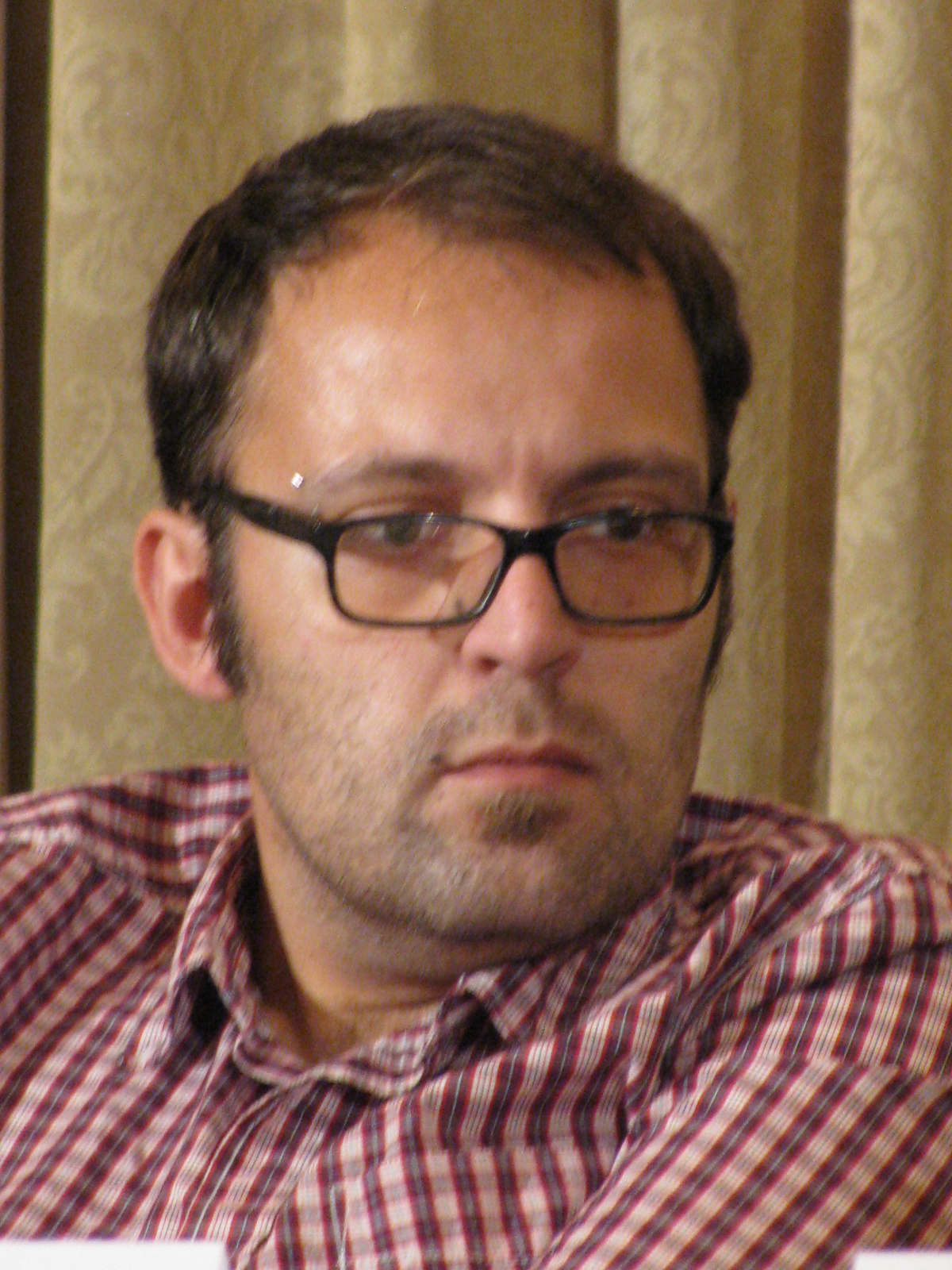
- Born: 2 January 1979 (age 47); Thessaloniki, Greece
- Education: Medicine, Aristotle University of Thessaloniki
- Occupation: Writer
- Spouse: Anastasios Samouilidis (2014-)
- Writing career
- Language: Greek, English
- Genres: Fiction, children's literature
- Notable work: The book of Katerina
- Website: corteau.gr

Petros Hadjopoulos (Greek: Πέτρος Χατζόπουλος; born 2 January 1979), better known by his pen name Auguste Corteau (Greek: Αύγουστος Κορτώ), is a Greek author.

== Early life ==
Corteau was born in Thessaloniki, in 2 January 1979.

== Career ==
In addition to the fourteen novels, novellas and short stories collections he has published over the years, he has also worked extensively as a translator, and has translated into Greek numerous works by English-language writers, amongst them books by Nabokov, Banville, Updike, Annie Proulx and Cormac McCarthy.

In 2004 Corteau won the Greek National Book Award for Children's Literature and the IBBY Prize for Best Children's Novel.

In 2014, he participated in the International Writing Program's Fall Residency at the University of Iowa in Iowa City, IA.

His latest novel, The Book of Katherine, chronicled his mother's lifelong struggle with bipolar disorder. It was adapted for stage by George Nanouris in 2014, starring Lena Papaligoura in the leading role and musician Lolek in the musical background of the performance.

== Gay Rights activism ==
Auguste Corteau is an activist against discrimination based on sexual orientation, and has even received verbal attacks on his positions. In November 2014, he married his partner in the state of New York. In January 2016, he signed with his partner a Cohabitation Pact, being the first same-sex couple after the law was passed in the Hellenic Parliament. He and his partner Anastasios Samouilidis were the first same-sex couple to get married at Athens City Hall, three weeks after same-sex marriage was legalized in Greece on February 15, 2024.

== List of works ==
=== Fiction ===
- The Book of Vice (short stories, Exandas, 1999)transl. Le livre des vices (Le serpent à plumes, 2001), Il libro dei vizi (Edizioni Est/Ouest, 2002)
- Rabastin (novel, Exandas, 1999)
- The Square (novel, Exandas, 2000)
- Haunted (novel, Exandas, 2001)
- Animal (whodunit, Exandas, 2002)
- The Streets Sculptor (novella, Odos Panos, 2002 – shortlisted for the Greek National Book Award–category:short fiction)
- The Man Faeries (whodunit, Exandas, 2003)
- La Gioconda's Son (novella, Exandas, 2003) trans. Le fils de la Joconde (Le serpent à plumes, 2007)
- The Rabies (novella, Minoas, 2004)
- Testosterone (original script for the movie by George Panoussoupoulos, 2004)
- Shameless Suicides (novel, Kastaniotis, 2005)
- The Demonizer (novel, Kastaniotis, 2007)
- The Obliteration of Nicos (novel, Kastaniotis, 2008)
- SIXTEEN (novel, Kastaniotis, 2010)

=== Children's literature ===
- Whatever Happened to Dorothy Snot? (Patakis, 2003 – Greek National Book Award for Children's Literature - transl. into Spanish by Ediciones Santillana as "La desaparición de Claudia Braun")
- The Rabbits’ Revolution (Kastaniotis, 2004)
- Mommy Doesn’t Want to Buy Me a Pet (Patakis, 2005)
- The Haunted Tower of Ursula de Fluff (Patakis, 2005)
- Santa Claus and the Little Devil (Kastaniotis, 2006)
- Little Santa (Ellinika Grammata, 2006)
- The Accursed Talisman of Meowfertiti (Patakis, 2007)
- Little Rouala (Kastaniotis, 2009)

=== Translations ===
- Les Sandals, by Jorge Semprun (Exandas, 2003)
- Les Onze Mille Verges, by Guillaume Apollinaire (Exandas, 2005)
- Down the Rabbit's Hole, by Peter Abrahams (Patakis, 2005)
- Les Anges Brûlent, by Thibault de Montaigu (Hestia, 2006)
- Close Range, by Annie Proulx (Kastaniotis, 2006)
- Villages, by John Updike (Kastaniotis, 2006)
- Ludmilla's Broken English, by D.B.C. Pierre (Ellinika Grammata, 2006)
- Christine Falls, by Benjamin Black (Kastaniotis, 2006)
- Postcards, by Annie Proulx (Kastaniotis, 2007)
- Lolita, by Vladimir Nabokov (To Vima, 2007)
- Terrorist, by John Updike (Kastaniotis, 2007)
- Behind the Curtain, by Peter Abrahams (Patakis, 2007)
- The Road, by Cormac McCarhty (Kastaniotis, 2007)
- Night Watch, by Sarah Waters (Kastaniotis, 2007)
- The Gathering, by Anne Enright (Kastaniotis, 2007)
- No Country for Old Men, by Cormac McCarthy (Kastaniotis, 2008)
- Black Girl / White Girl, by Joyce Carol Oates (Kastaniotis, 2008)
- Oil!, by Upton Sinclair (Kastaniotis, 2008)
- Bad Dirt, by Annie Proulx (Kastaniotis, 2008)
- Into the Dark, by Peter Abrahams (Patakis, 2008)
- The Secret Scripture, by Sebastian Barry (Kastaniotis, 2009)
