= Wesley Updike =

American educator and soldier

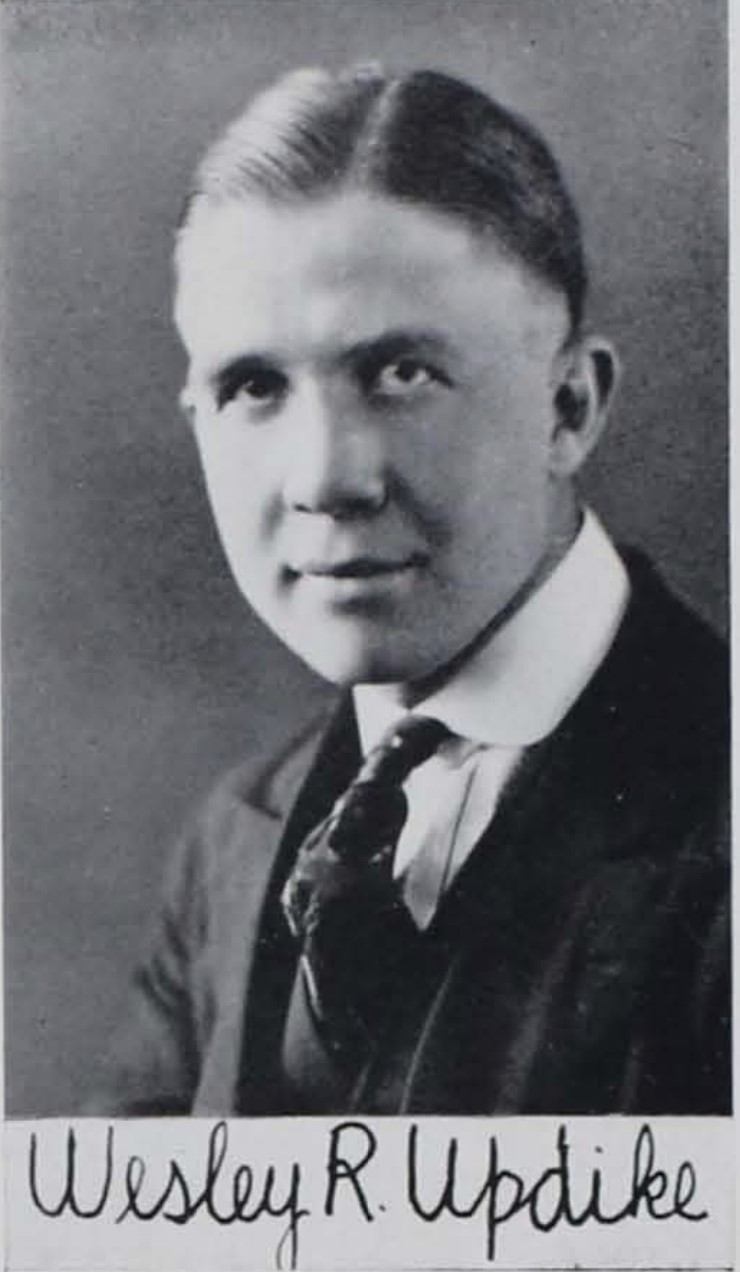
Wesley Updike 1923 Ursinus yearbook photo

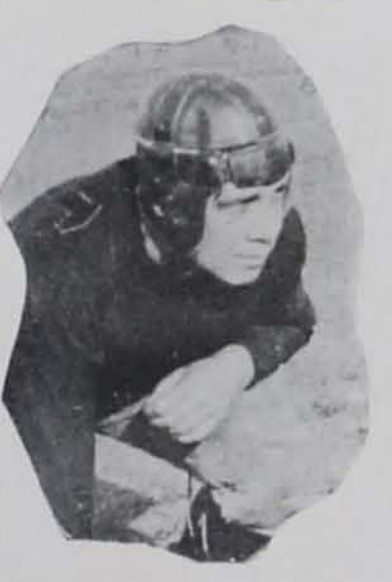
Wesley Updike playing football at Ursinus College, ca. 1920s

Wesley Russell Updike (1900 – 1972) was an American educator, soldier, and father of author John Updike, husband of writer Linda Grace Hoyer Updike, and grandfather of David Updike. Wesley Updike served as a prominent model for many main characters his son's works, including as the central character in The Centaur (1963), which won the National Book Award for Fiction, and Updike's family history is broadly paralleled in In the Beauty of the Lilies (1996).

== Early life and education ==
Wesley Russell Updike was born on February 22, 1900, in Trenton, New Jersey, to Virginia (Blackwood) Updike, a Missouri native, and Rev. Hartley Titus Updike, a Princeton educated Presbyterian minister, who suffered employment difficulties due to a throat ailment. Updike had an older brother, Archibald. and sister, Mary. As a child Updike had to wear braces due to malnutrition-related developmental issues. In high school he suffered an injury while hauling newspapers and had to leave school, but a donor allowed him to return and attend St. Stephen's Episcopal Boarding School (later known as Bard College). During World War I Wesley Updike served as a private in the Student Army Training Corps from October 30, 1918, until December 13, 1918. Wesley Updike enrolled at Ursinus College in Pennsylvania in 1919 on a football scholarship and was a chemical-biological major.

== Marriage, birth of John, and career in Shillington ==
Updike met his future wife, Linda Hoyer, on his first day of college, and married her in 1925. After graduation Updike worked various jobs including teaching at schools in Florida and Delaware, superintending a small oil and gas field in Ohio, and working as a hotel desk clerk in Reading, Pennsylvania. From 1927 to 1932 Updike worked as a lineman for AT&T. Updike's only child, John, was born in 1932. After being laid off during the Great Depression in 1932, Wesley Updike became certified as a teacher after studying at Albright College, and then in 1934 he obtained a job as a math teacher in Shillington, Pennsylvania, with the help of his wife's cousin. Updike was a popular and humorous teacher and many of his antics were re-told in The Centaur and other works by his son, who had his father as a teacher for three years. In 1941 Updike received a M.S. in education from the University of Pennsylvania. The Updikes lived with Linda Updike's parents in Shillington until 1945 when they repurchased the family farm in nearby Plowville, which the family had sold in the 1920s, and they family moved back there over Wesley and John's objections. Wesley Updike was also active in the Lutheran church in Shillington and Plowville. Updike died April 16, 1972, in Reading, Pennsylvania, and was buried in the Robeson Lutheran Church Cemetery. Many of Wesley and Linda Updike's papers were donated to Ursinus College by their son.
