= John Updike Childhood Home =

- U.S. National Register of Historic Places
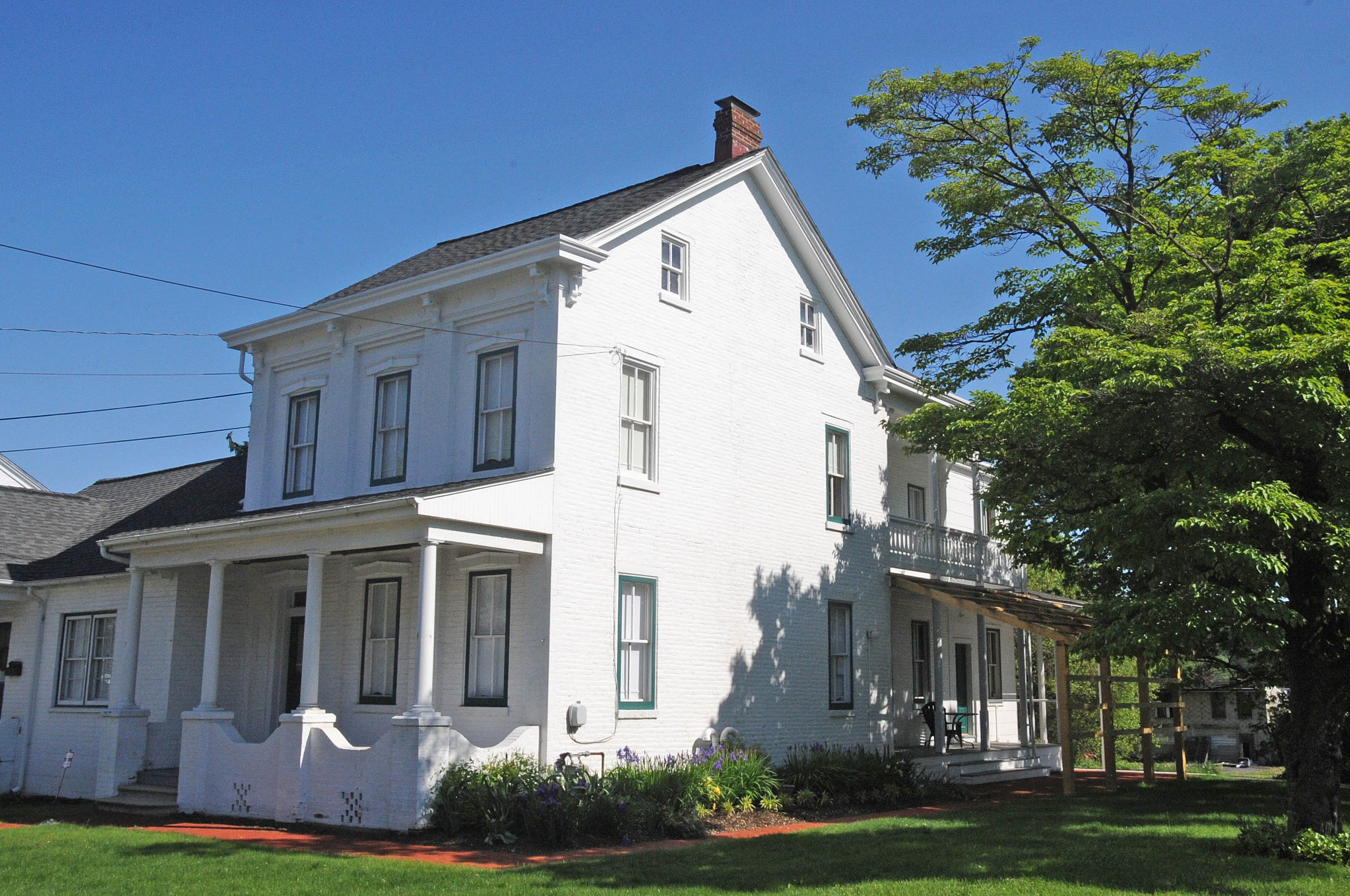
- John Updike Childhood Home
- Location: 117 Philadelphia Ave, Shillington, Pennsylvania
- Coordinates: 40°18′08″N 75°57′54″W
- NRHP reference No.: 100003635
- Added to NRHP: April 22, 2019

The John Updike Childhood Home is the childhood home of American novelist and two-time Pulitzer Prize winner John Updike, who lived there with his father Wesley Russell Updike and mother Linda Grace Hoyer Updike, who was also a writer. The home is located in Shillington, Pennsylvania, a suburb of the City of Reading.

== History and architectural features ==
Living in the house from the time he was born until he was thirteen years of age, Updike wrote his first fiction, poetry and prose in the house and "famously said it was where his 'artistic eggs were hatched.'” The home and surrounding communities of Shillington and Reading inspired a great deal of Updike's writings, with several of his works specifically incorporating parts of the house and the community.

The building was listed on the National Register of Historic Places on April 22, 2019. In 2021, the home received a Pennsylvania Historic Marker and was opened as a museum operated by the John Updike Society. The museum features ten rooms of exhibits that discuss Updike's childhood and the influence the area had on him and his writing.
