= Elizabeth Updike Cobblah =

American art teacher and ceramicist

Elizabeth Updike Cobblah (born 1955) is an American art teacher and ceramicist, painter, and illustrator in Massachusetts. She is the eldest child of author John Updike, and was the model for several of his characters. She is married to Tete Cobblah.

== Early life and education ==
Elizabeth Pennington Updike was born in 1955 in England while her father, John Updike, and mother, Mary Pennington (Updike) Weatherall, were studying at Oxford University's Ruskin School of Drawing. John Updike wrote "March a Birthday Poem" about Cobblah's birth. As an infant she returned to New York City with her parents while her father wrote for The New Yorker. The family then moved to Ipswich, Massachusetts, where she spent most of her childhood with her three younger siblings, including the writer David Updike. She graduated from the Pingree School, Salem State University and then Rhode Island School of Design in Providence, where she met her husband, Tete Cobblah, a native of Ghana. They have two sons.

== Career ==
In 1990 Cobblah illustrated The Predator, a book written by her grandmother, Linda Grace Hoyer Updike. Characters based on Cobblah appear in many of her father's published writings, including "Grandparenting", the Rabbit series, "Toward Evening," "Incest," "Should Wizard Hit Mommy," "Avec la Bebe-sitter," "The Music School," "Daughter, Last Glimpses," and "Separating." Since Updike's death in 2009, Cobblah has been an active supporter and donor to Updike's museum in Pennsylvania as well as charities for the disabled in Ghana. She teaches art at the Fenn School in Concord, and lives in Maynard, Massachusetts.
