= Barber Extracting a Tooth =

Painting by Adriaen van Ostade

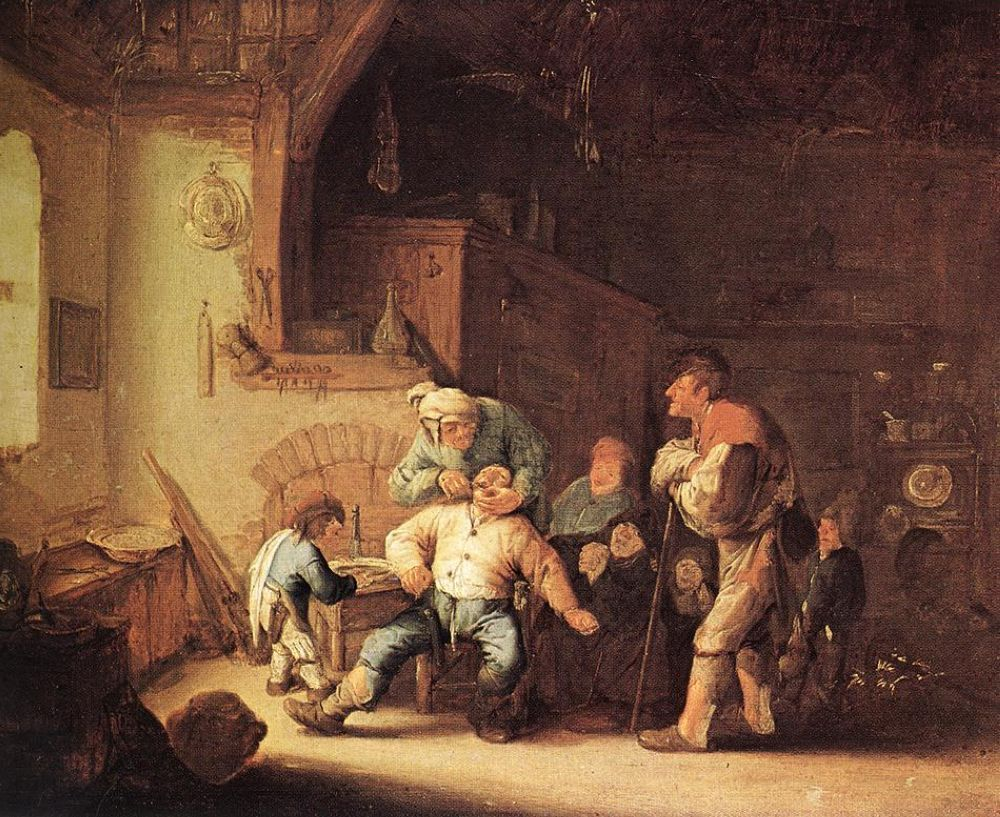
- Artist: Adriaen van Ostade
- Year: c. 1630–1635
- Medium: oil on panel
- Dimensions: 34 cm × 41.3 cm (13 in × 16.3 in)
- Location: Kunsthistorisches Museum, Vienna

Barber Extracting a Tooth is an oil-on-panel genre painting by Adriaen van Ostade, dated from c. 1630–1635. It is held in the Kunsthistorisches Museum, in Vienna.

== Description ==
The painting depicts a genre scene in a humble barbershop, where the vaillage barber surgeon extracts a villager’s tooth under the gaze of several figures, some of whose faces appear slightly blurred. A shaft of light from the window illuminates the left side of the scene, a characteristic technique of the artist, while the right side remains in partial shadow. On the wall, a series of scissors alludes to the barbershop’s function. As was often the case, the painter favored popular themes, which he approached with great realism.
