= Job Adriaenszoon Berckheyde =

Dutch painter

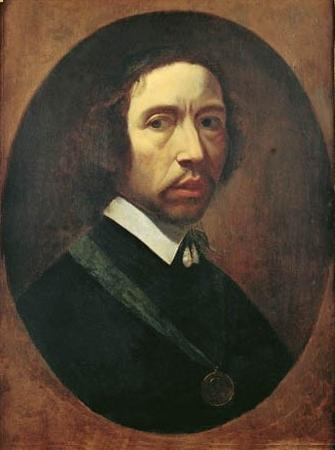
- Selfportrait.
- Born: Job Adriaenszoon Berckheyde; Haarlem, Netherlands
- Died: 23 November 1693
- Known for: Painting
- Movement: Baroque

Job Adriaenszoon Berckheyde (baptized 27 January 1630 – before 23 November 1693) was a Dutch artist of the 17th century, active in Haarlem, Amsterdam, and The Hague.

== Biography ==
Job Berckheyde was born in Haarlem and was the older brother of the painter Gerrit who he later taught to paint. He was apprenticed on 2 November 1644 to Jacob Willemszoon de Wet, and his master's influence is apparent in his first dated canvas, "Christ Preaching to the Children" (1661), one of his few biblical scenes. On 10 June 1653 he repaid a loan from the Haarlem Guild of Saint Luke. From 1656-1660 the two brothers made an extended trip along the Rhine to Germany, stopping off at Cologne, Bonn, Mannheim and finally Heidelberg, following the example of their fellow guild member Vincent van der Vinne. The brothers worked in Heidelberg for Charles I Louis, Elector Palatine (with Job producing portraits and hunting scenes, and receiving a gold chain from the Elector in reward) but were ultimately unable to adapt to court life and so returned to Haarlem, where they shared a house and perhaps a studio. He became a member of the Haarlem rederijkersgilde 'De Wijngaardranken' in 1666–1682. He is registered in Amsterdam 1682–1688, where he became a member of the Guild of St Luke there in 1685–1688. Berckheyde was buried in Haarlem.

== Works ==
He could paint landscapes in the same style as his brother, but seems to have preferred interiors and genre works, whereas his brother's oeuvre consists mostly of outdoor scenes. The Elector's gold chain may be the one he wears in his early Self-portrait (1655), his only documented work from the 1650s. Job is better known for his later work, which consists mainly of interior views of the Sint-Bavokerk in Haarlem and simple genre scenes recalling those of his Haarlem contemporaries Adriaen van Ostade and Jan Steen. Less prolific than his brother, but more varied in his output, producing bible and genre scenes as well as cityscapes. Confusion between their works may have resulted from the similarity of their signatures, where Job's j resembles Gerrit's g. Job also signed his work with an H (for Hiob or Job) and with the monogram HB.
