= Gerrit Berckheyde =

Dutch Golden Age painter

Gerrit Adriaenszoon Berckheyde
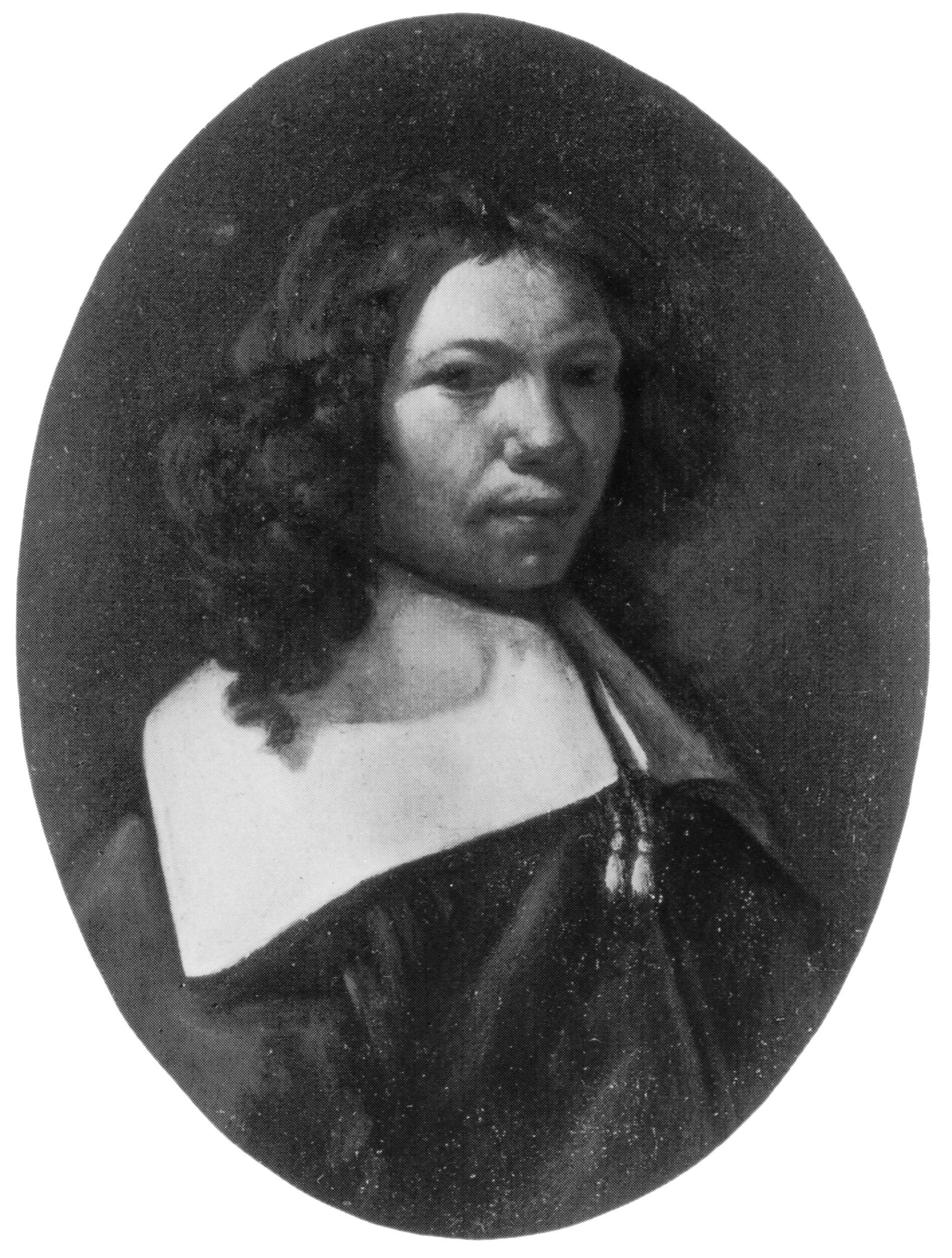
- Gerrit Berckheyde portrayed by his brother Job
- Born: 1638; Haarlem
- Died: 10 June 1698 (aged 59–60); Haarlem

Gerrit Adriaenszoon Berckheyde (1638 – 10 June 1698) was a Dutch Golden Age painter, active in Haarlem, Amsterdam, and The Hague, who is best known today for his cityscapes.

== Biography ==
Berckheyde was born and died in Haarlem. Christened as an infant 6 June 1638, he was the younger brother (by eleven years) and student of the painter Job Adriaenszoon Berckheyde. Golden-age historian Arnold Houbraken claimed that Job had been trained as a bookbinder by his father, and could not discover who taught him to paint. Gerrit, in turn, learned from his older brother. Job's teacher must have been a Haarlem master, and some claim it was Frans Hals, but Houbraken claimed he travelled as a journeyman between Leiden and Utrecht, offering his services as a portrait painter and learned by doing. During the 1650s the two brothers made an extended trip along the Rhine to Germany, stopping off at Cologne, Bonn, Mannheim and finally Heidelberg. The brothers worked in Heidelberg for Charles I Louis, Elector Palatine, where they were both awarded a golden medal for their efforts, but were ultimately unable to adapt to court life and so returned to Haarlem, where they shared a house and studio. Gerrit became a member of the Haarlem Guild of Saint Luke on 27 July 1660. He was followed by the painter Adriaen Oudendijck.

== Works ==
According to the Netherlands Institute for Art History (RKD), he was a painter known for his Italianate landscapes as well as portraits and cavalry pieces. His influences include Pieter Saenredam's style (for church interiors), refined draughtsmanship and dispassionate attitude—in short, the qualities of "Dutch Classicism", akin to Vermeer. Berckheyde favoured views of monuments on large open squares, rather than giving up clarity for the sake of pictorial effect by painting views along canals as the other great Dutch cityscape painter, Jan van der Heyden, did.

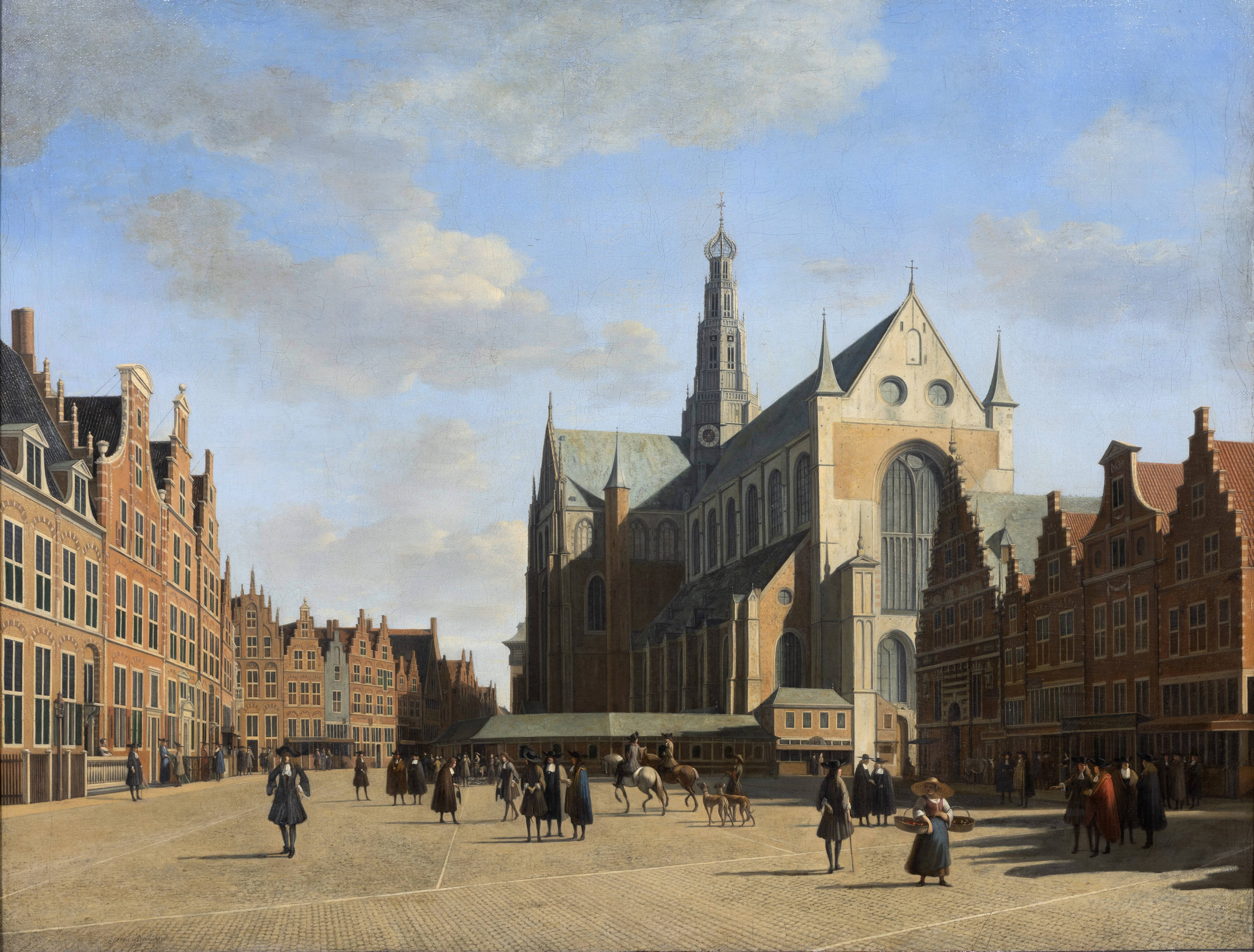
The Grote Markt and Grote Kerk, Haarlem, in 1696, by Gerrit Adriaenszoon Berckheyde

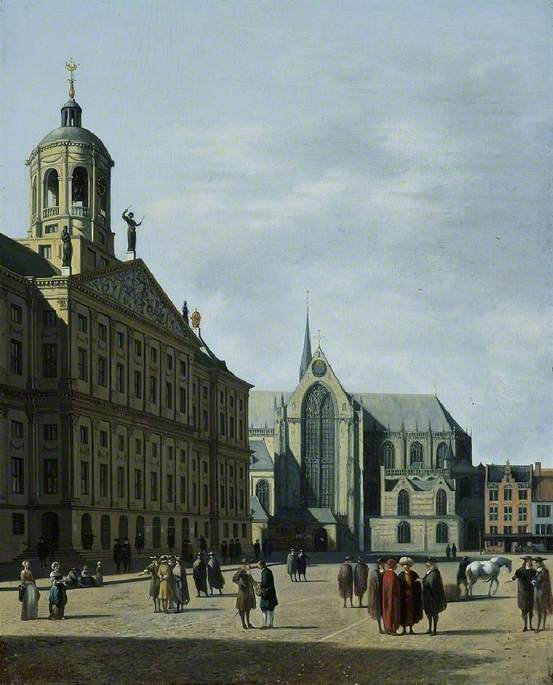
The new City Hall of Amsterdam, 1670s

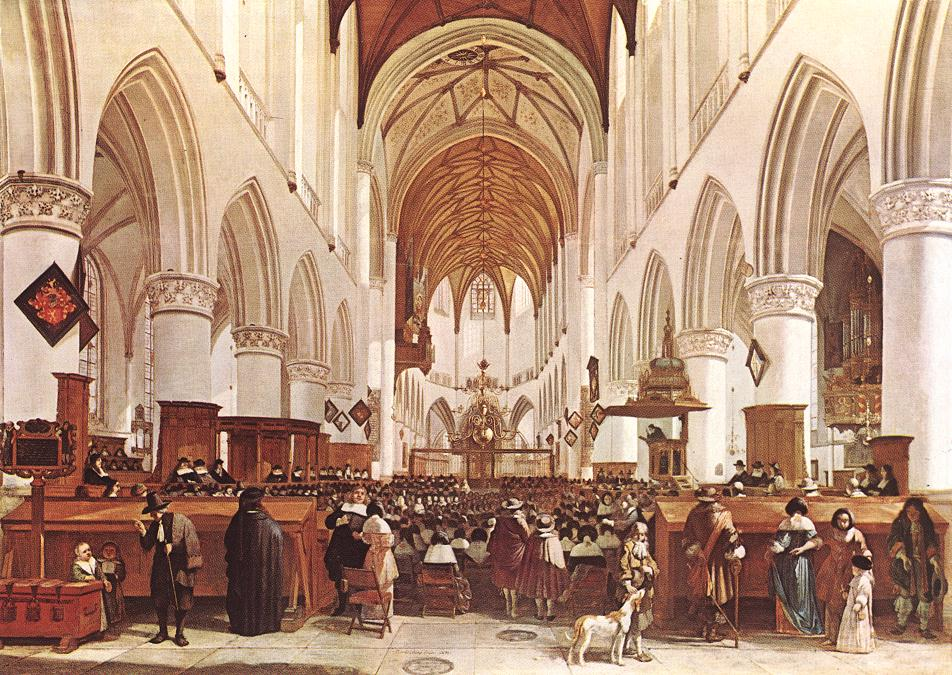
Interior of the Grote Kerk, Haarlem, 1673

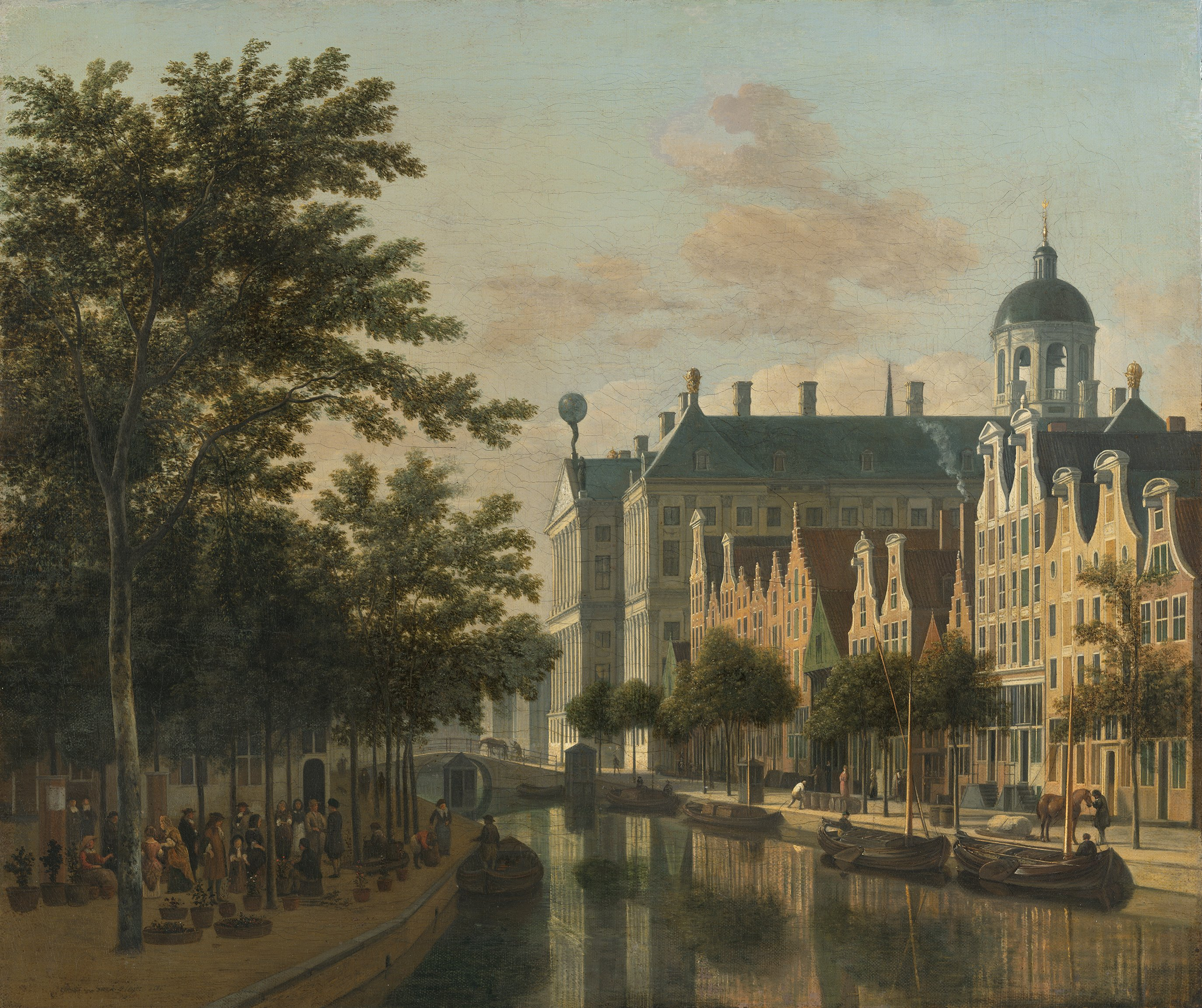
The Nieuwezijds Voorburgwal with the Flower Market, Amsterdam, 1686

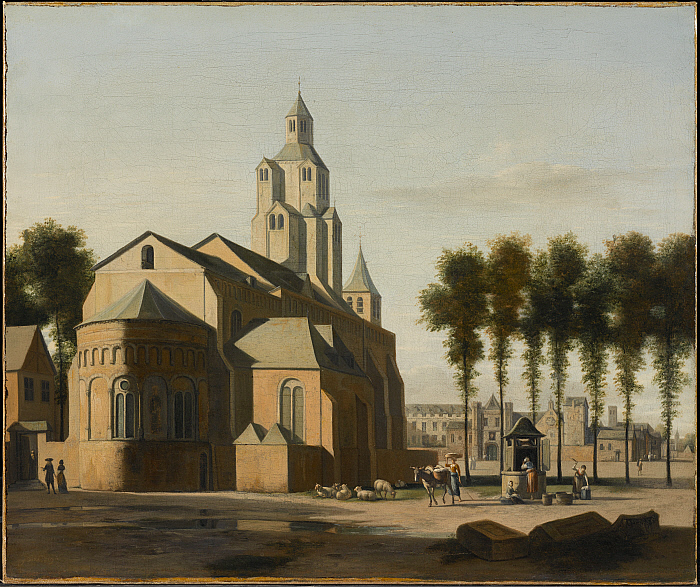
Church of Saint Cecilia, Cologne (c.1685), Oil on canvas, 20 3/8 x 24 1/4 in. (51.8 x 61.6 cm), Clark Art Institute

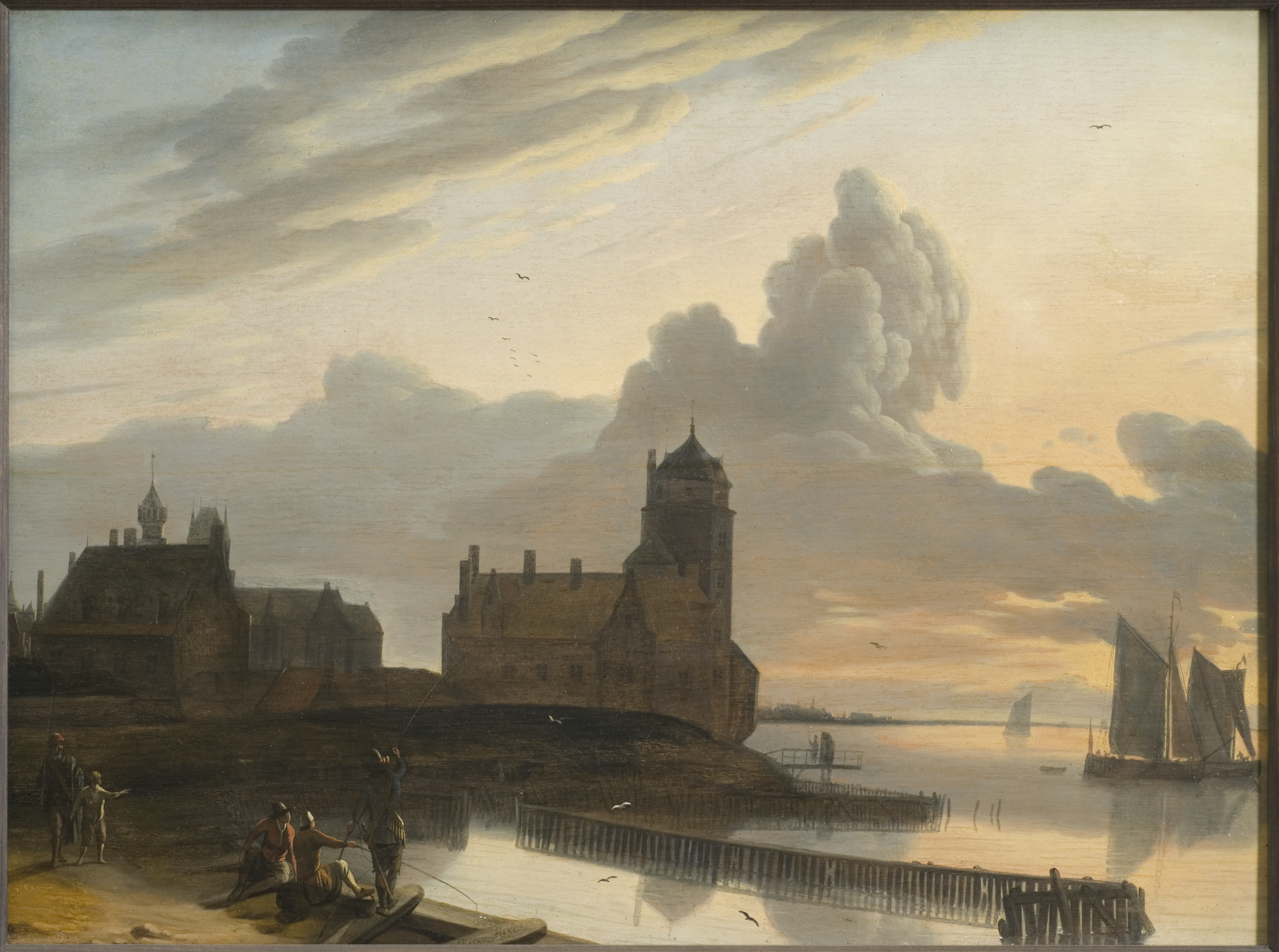
The Castle of Emden (Emderburg) in East Frisia (Nationalmuseum in Stockholm)
