= Isaac van Ostade =

Dutch painter

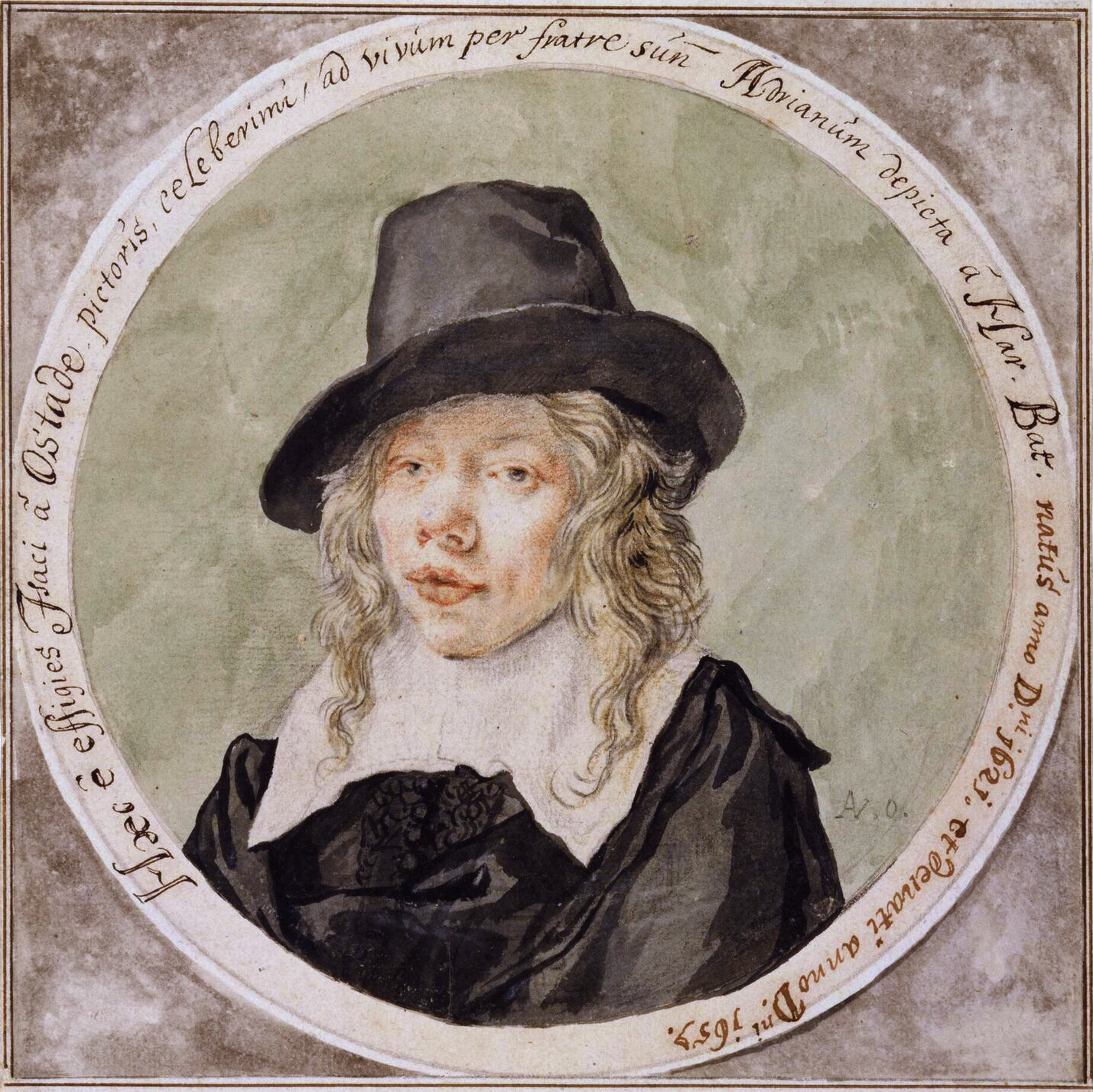
Isaac van Ostade (Cornelis Dusart)

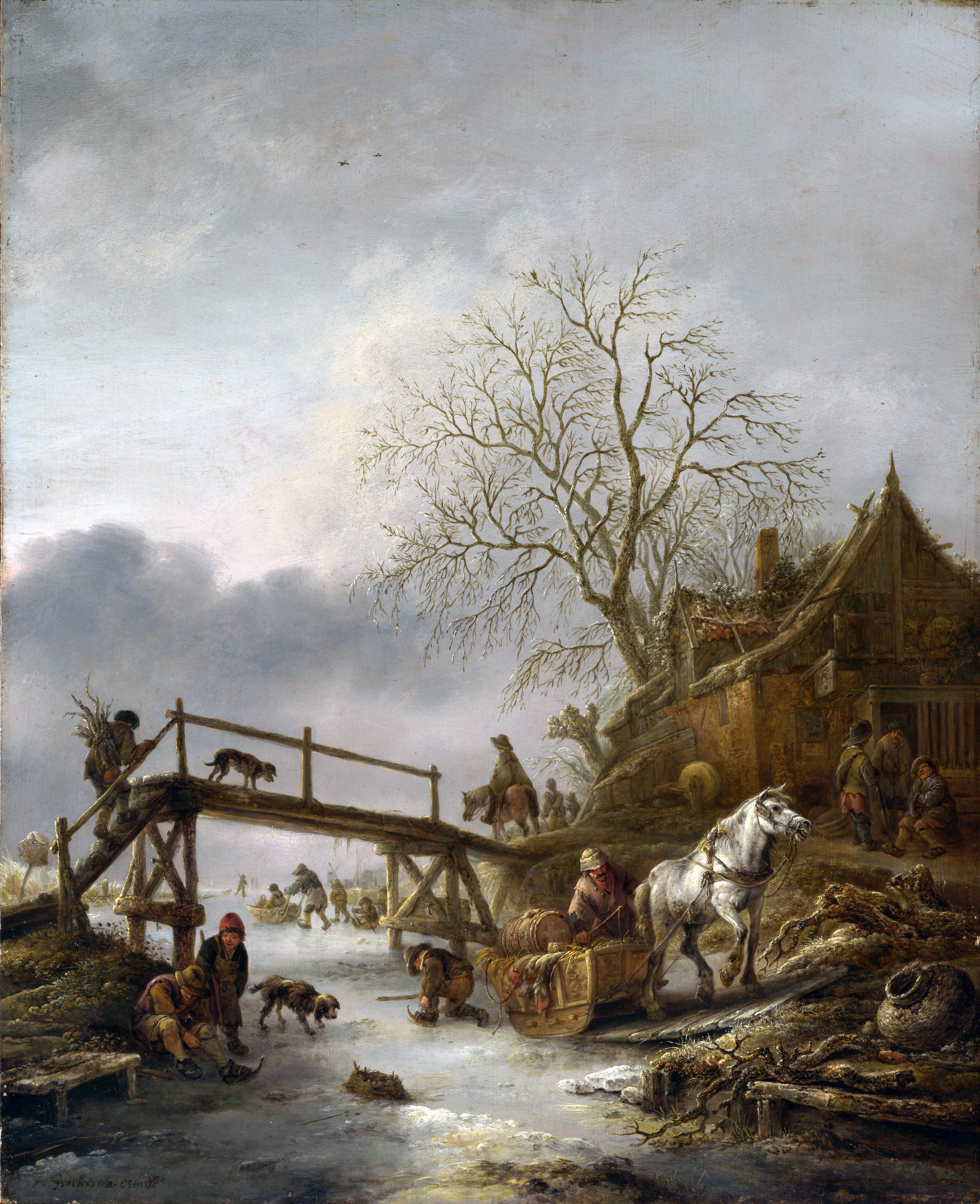
A Winter Scene by Isaac van Ostade (c.1645) Oil on wood, 48,8 x 40 cm. National Gallery, London

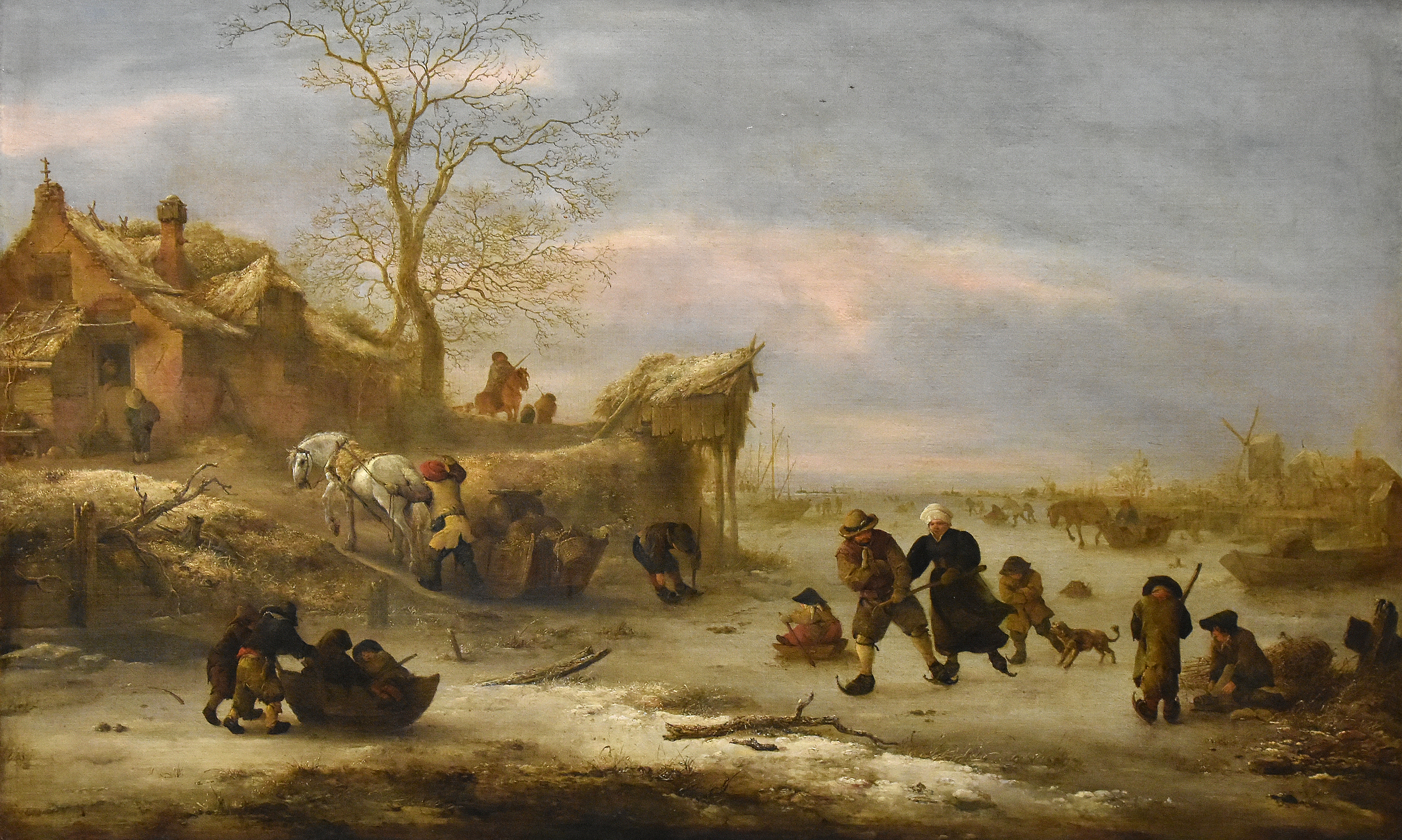
Frozen river at the Louvre

Isaac van Ostade (bapt. June 2, 1621 – buried October 16, 1649) was a Dutch genre and landscape painter.

== Biography ==
Van Ostade was born in Haarlem. He began his studies under his brother, Adriaen, with whom he remained until 1641, when he started his own practice. At an early period he felt the influence of Rembrandt, and this is apparent in a Slaughtered Pig of 1639, in the gallery of Augsburg. He soon found a style more suited to his own inclinations. He produced pictures in 1641–1642 on the lines of his brother – amongst these, the Five Senses, which Adrian afterwards represented by a Man reading a Paper, a Peasant tasting Beer, a Rustic smearing his Sores with Ointment and a Countryman sniffing at a Snuff-box. A specimen of Isaac's work at this period may be seen in the Laughing Boor with a Pot of Beer, in the museum of Amsterdam; the cottage interior, with two peasants and three children near a fire, in the Berlin museum; a Concert, with people listening to singers accompanied by a piper and flute player, and a Boor stealing a Kiss from a Woman, in the Lacaze collection at the Louvre.

The interior at Berlin is lighted from a casement in the same Rembrandtesque style as Adrian's interior of 1643 at the Louvre. He received low prices for this kind of painting, in which he could only remain subordinate to his brother. Gradually he abandoned Adriaen's cottage subjects for landscapes in the fashion of Esaias van de Velde and Salomon van Ruysdael. Once only, in 1645, he reverted to the earlier mode, when he produced the Slaughtered Pig, with a boy puffing out a bladder, in the museum of Lille.

Isaac's progress in his new path was greatly facilitated by his previous experience as a figure painter; and, although he now selected his subjects either from village high streets or frozen canals, he gave fresh life to the scenes by depicting animated groups of people with a refined and searching study of picturesque contrasts. He did not live long enough to bring his art to the highest perfection. He died on 16 October 1649 in Haarlem, having painted about 400 pictures (see H. de Groot, 1910).

The first manifestation of Isaac's surrender of Adriaen's style is apparent in 1644 when the skating and sledging scenes were executed which we see in the Lacaze collection and the galleries of the Hermitage, Antwerp and Lille. Three of these examples were known to bear the artists name, spelled as Isack van Ostade, and the dates of 1644 and 1645. The roadside inns, with halts of travellers, form a compact series from 1646 to 1649. This is the last form of Isaac's art and has very distinct peculiarities. The air which pervades his composition is warm and sunny, yet mellow and hazy, as if the sky were veiled with a vapour coloured by moor smoke. The trees are rubbings of umber, in which the prominent foliage is tipped with touches hardened in a liquid state by amber varnish mediums. The same principle applied to details such as glazed bricks or rents in the mud lining of cottages gives an unreal and conventional stamp to them.

He was accomplished in using contrasts of light and shade and in the rendering of figures of horses, riders, travellers, rustics, quarrelling children, dogs, poultry and cattle. A prominent place in the composition is always given to the white horse, which seems as invariable an accompaniment as the grey in the skirmishes and fairs of Philip Wouwerman.

Isaac van Ostade's winter landscapes often depict cold, clear weather with minimal smoke or vapour, utilizing a wide range of light and opal tones rather than traditional brown tints. These settings provide high-contrast backgrounds for figures, such as those seen in his depictions of roadside inns. Examples of his winter scenes are held in several major collections, including Buckingham Palace, the National Gallery in London, the Wallace Collection, the Louvre, the Berlin State Museums, the Hermitage Museum, and the Museum Boijmans Van Beuningen in Rotterdam.

For paintings and etchings see Les Fréres Ostade, by Marguerite van de Wiele (Paris, 1893). For his etchings see L'Œuvre d'Ostade, cu description des eaux-fortes de ce maître, etc., by Auguste d'Orange (1860); and Catalogue raisonné de toutes les estampes qui forment l'œuvre grave d'Adrian van Ostade, by L.E. Faucheux (Paris, 1862).
