= Customers Conversing in a Tavern =

Painting by Adriaen van Ostade

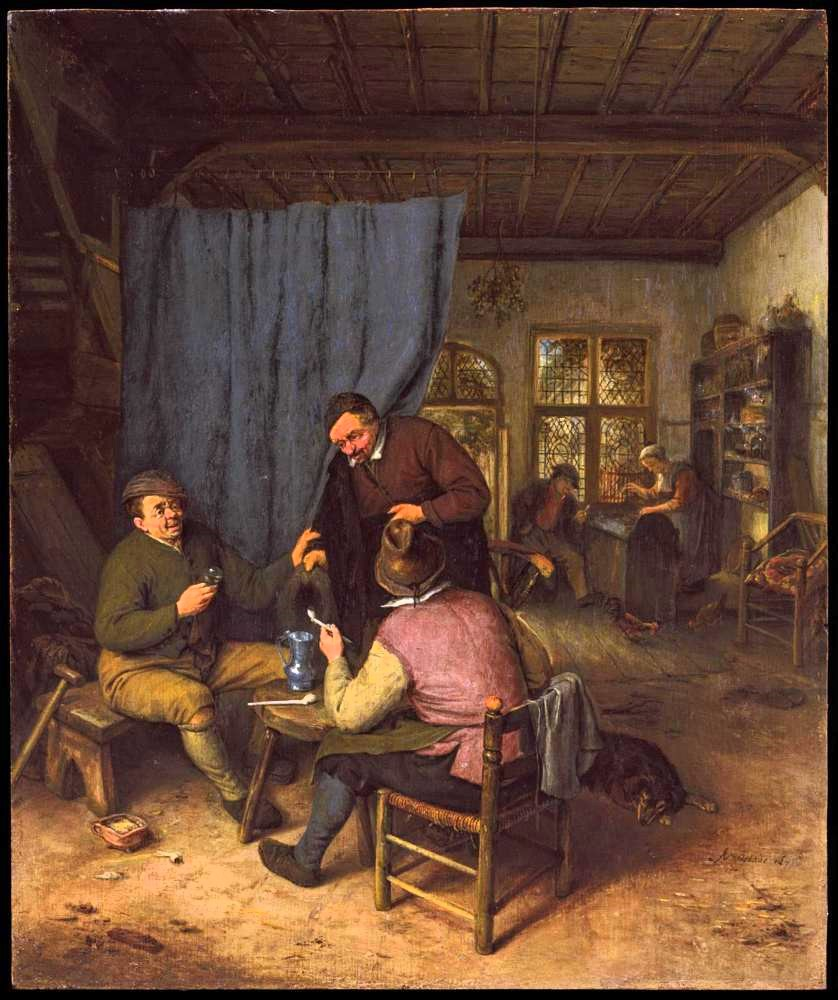
- Artist: Adriaen van Ostade
- Year: 1671
- Medium: Oil on panel
- Dimensions: 44.5 cm × 37.5 cm (17.5 in × 14.8 in)
- Location: Museum of Fine Arts, Boston
- Accession: L-R 55.2023

Customers Conversing in a Tavern is a Dutch Golden Age Oil-on-panel painting by artist Adriaen van Ostade completed in 1671. A promised gift to the Museum of Fine Arts, Boston by collectors Susan and Matthew Weatherbie as part of an expansion on Dutch and Flemish paintings, it was subjected to provenance research, to which it has been revealed to have been looted by the Nazis.

The painting depicts two groups of people chatting in a bar, accompanied with a sleeping dog and two roosters pecking at the floor.

== Provenance ==
The painting was first listed in an anonymous sale on November 10, 1801, subsequently in the collection of Joshua Charles Vanneck, 4th Baron Huntingfield.

The painting was under the ownership of Jonas Lek of Brussels until 1925, then the Vicar Brothers in London. It entered the collection of German Jewish art dealer and bookseller Paul Graupe in 1937.

In 1937, Graupe's business was Aryanized under Nazi-era policy. He then fled to Paris and subsequently opened a gallery with art dealer Arthur Goldschmidt, who also fled the persecution. The painting was with him in Paris when Graupe fled to Switzerland in 1939, placing the painting under the possession of Goldschmidt, who placed it in a storage facility in prior to the Fall of France. Goldschmidt subsequently sold the painting to one of Hitler's art dealers, Karl Haberstock, on February 19, 1941, prior to fleeing France in July 1941 to Cuba.

While in Portugal, Graupe reported Goldschmidt to French authorities for "wrongfully holding property" in a dispute amongst the management of his paintings.

Graupe recovered four of eight paintings that were in store with the Ostade after fleeing, but disavowed Goldschmidt for selling off some of his other works without his involvement.

Through Haberstock, the painting was sold to Hans Posse on February 19, 1941. It was intended to be part of the Führermuseum which was to be built in Linz. But by the end of the war, the painting was recovered by the Monuments Men at the Altaussee Salt Mine and sent to be restituted in France. Though initially claimed by Graupe after the war, the painting was removed from the claimed list due to not making the qualifications of being looted, and was subsequently sold by public auction in 1951.

The piece was sold from the Salle des Ventes de l’Administration des Domaines, Paris on March 6, 1951, subsequently by M.O. Leegenhoek in 1951 to Matthiesen, Ltd in 1955, then to Gebr. Douwes of Amsterdam in 1955, subsequently then by Johnny Van Haeften to Susan and Matthew Weatherbie of Boston in 1992.

== Resolution ==
Upon arrival at the MFA in 2017, Victoria Reed, the provenance senior curator spotted the painting in the German Lost Art foundation database, unveiling the dispute between Graupe and Goldschmidt.

With a paid sum to the heirs of the Graupe and Goldschmidt family by the Weatherbies, the work was subsequently added as a pledged gift to the MFA and put on display in 2023.
