= Egbert van Heemskerck =

Dutch painter

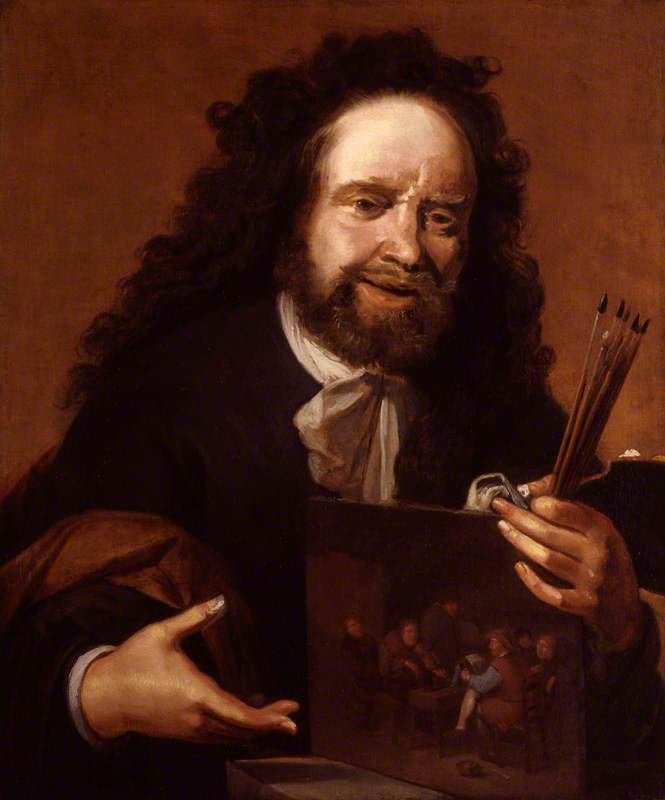
- Self-portrait in the National Portrait Gallery, London
- Born: 1634; Haarlem
- Died: 1704 (aged 69–70); London

Egbert van Heemskerck, or Egbert Jaspersz van Heemskerk (1634–1704) was a Haarlem Dutch Golden Age painter of genre works who moved to London in the 1670s and died there in 1704. He is known for popular comical and satirical works, a few of which were engraved and printed during his lifetime, thanks to his patron John Wilmot, 2nd Earl of Rochester.

== Biography ==
Egbert Jaspersz was born in Haarlem to the doctor Jasper Jaspersz van Heemskerck and his wife Marytge Jansdr van Stralen. He first became a pupil of the painter Pieter de Grebber. After his father's death, his mother married the art dealer Jan Wijnants in 1651. Jan Wijnants was the father of the landscape painter Jan Wijnants, making Jan and Egbert stepbrothers. He became a member of the Haarlem Guild of St. Luke in 1646]. Though listed in 1646, he may have become a member in 1664 (a year suspiciously lacking member registrations), like other members mistakenly registered in 1646, such as Evert Collier and Evert Oudendijck.

In Haarlem in 1663 he declared himself to be 28, and in 1665, he declared himself to be 31 years old. In the early 1670s he moved to London, where one of his often satirical paintings apparently landed him in serious trouble with King Charles II of England. Though he is registered as having died in London in 1704, he was listed by Laurens van der Vinne as one of the painters who had predeceased his father in 1702. His works are sometimes confused with the works of his son, another genre painter also called Egbert van Heemskerk, who lived c. 1676 – 1744. Possibly Egbert Jaspersz had two sons, or perhaps a grandson. The Netherlands Institute for Art History currently splits the works of these painters between the father as "Egbert van Heemskerck (I)" and son as "Egbert van Heemskerck (II)".

Various genre paintings are exhibited in the Rijksmuseum in Amsterdam, the Louvre in Paris, the Musée des Beaux-Arts in Tournai, the Bowes Museum in Barnard Castle, the National Gallery of Victoria, Melbourne, and the Fitzwilliam Museum in Cambridge.

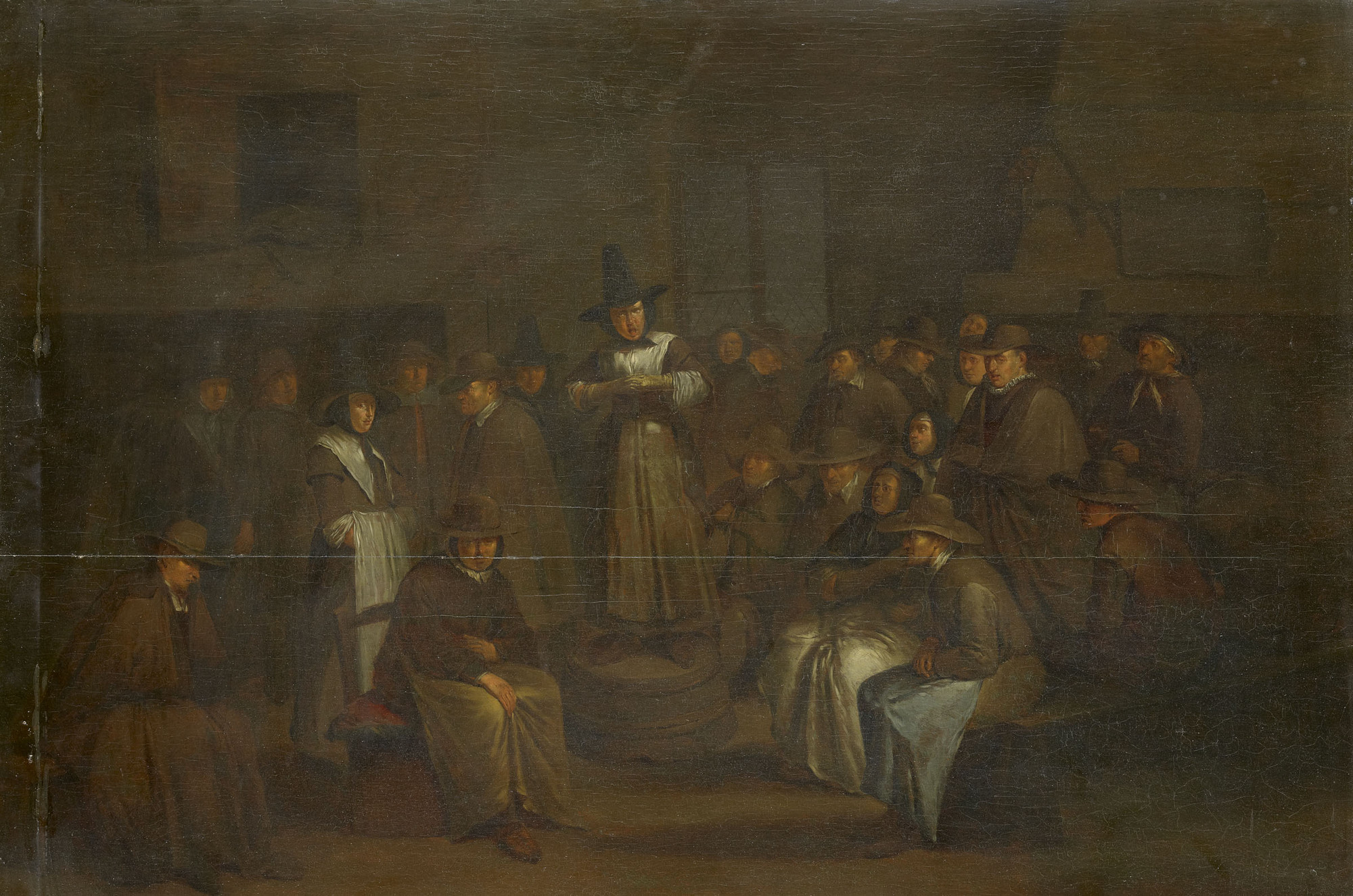
The Quaker Meeting, Royal Collection

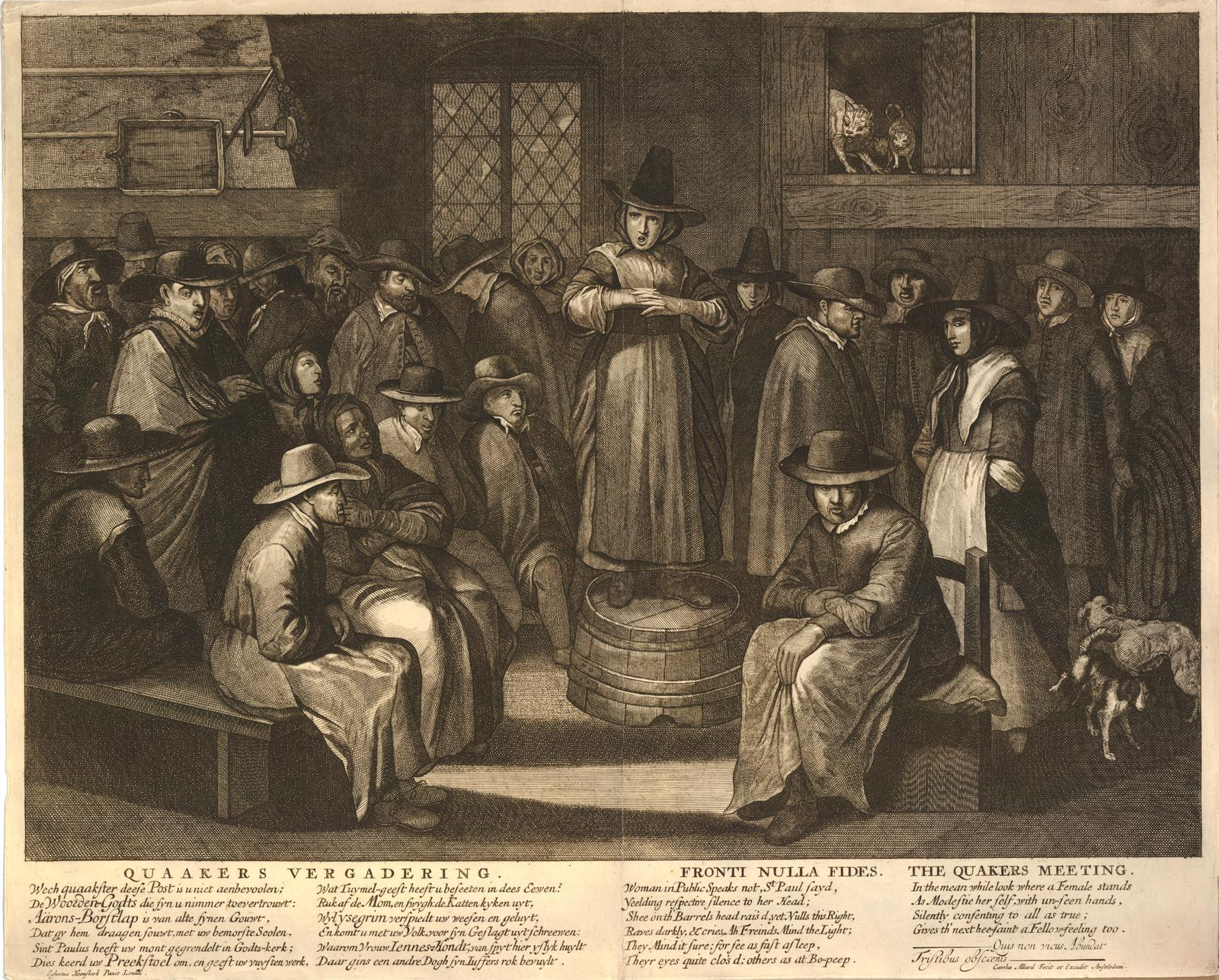
Engraved version of the Quaker Meeting with Dutch, Latin, and English captions

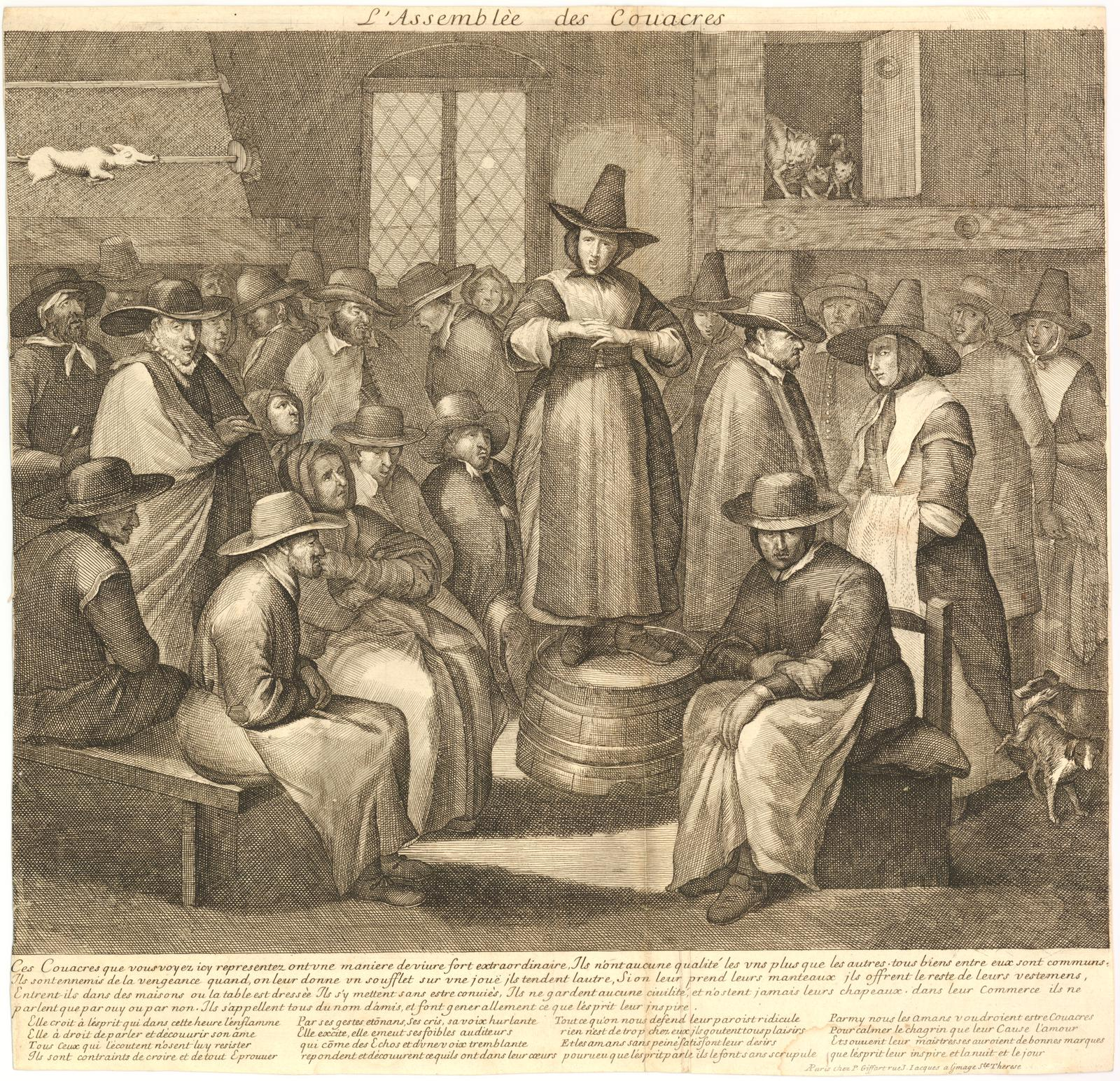
The Quaker Meeting engraved circa 1680 with the French title L'Assemblèe des Couacres

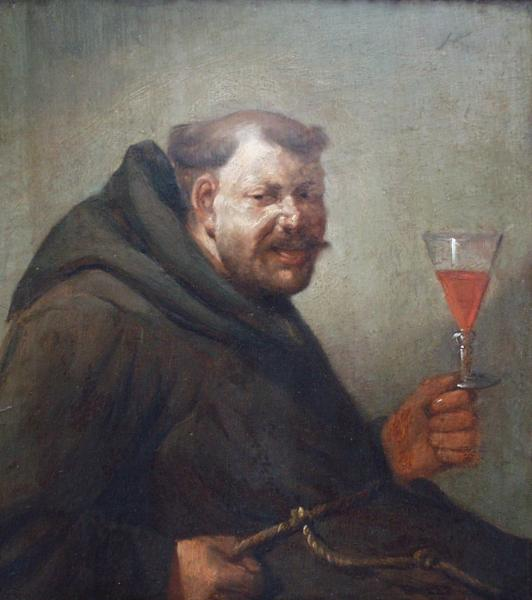
Drinking monk, Museum Bredius, ca.1650

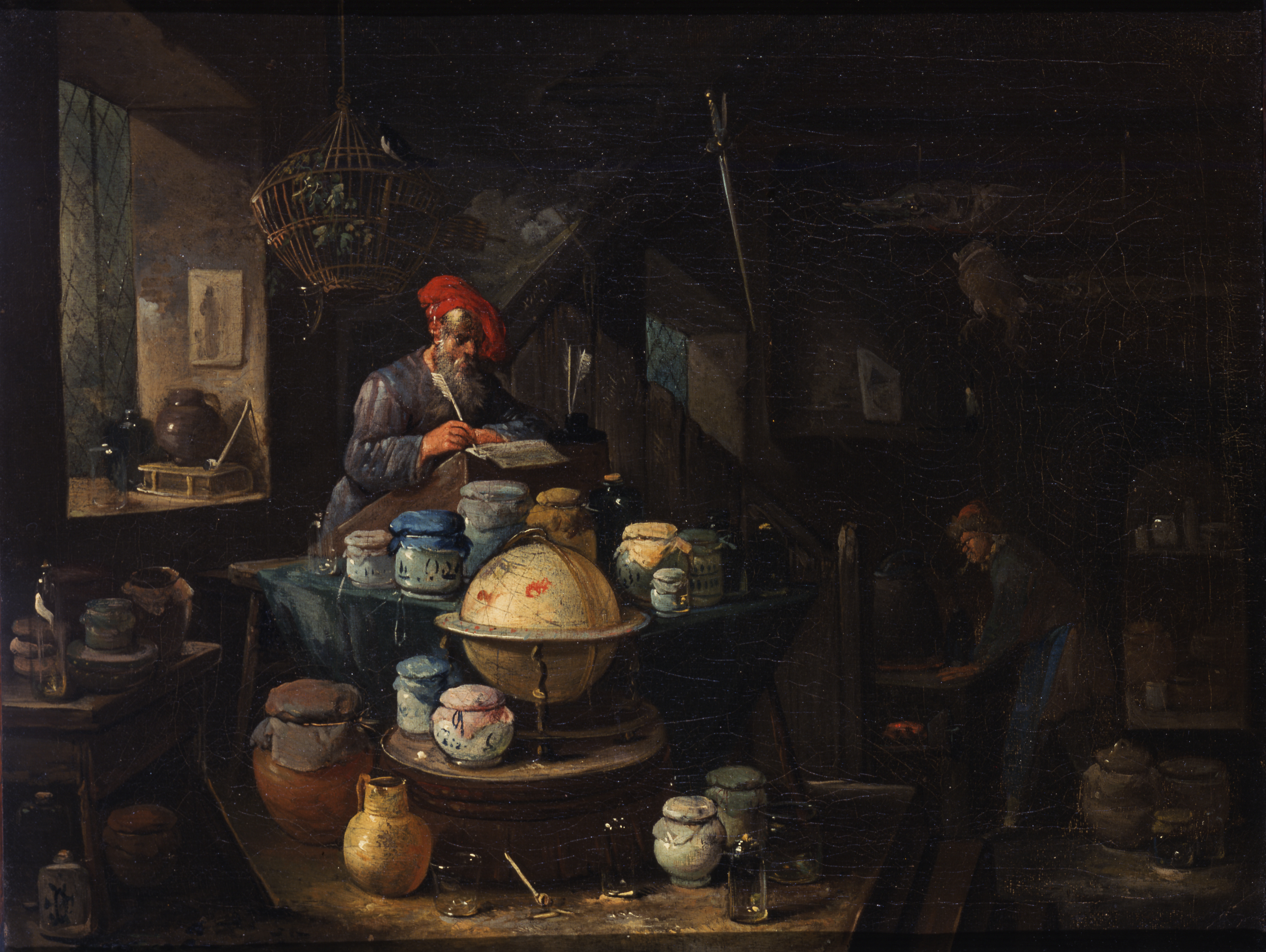
An Alchemist in His Study, Egbert van Heemskerck (I), Science History Institute
