= Cornelis Dusart =

Dutch painter

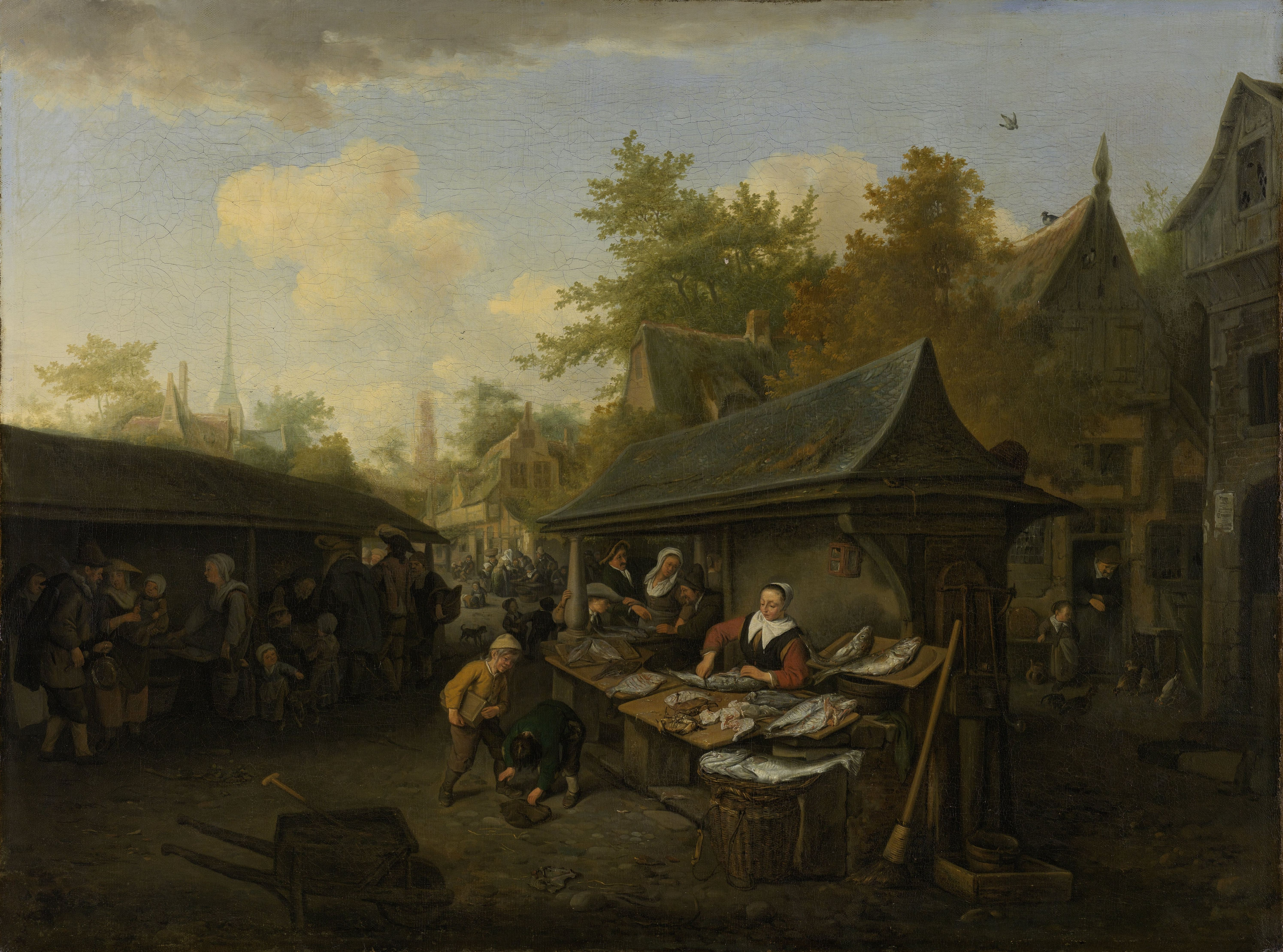
Fish market (1683). Oil on canvas. 68.5 × 90.5 cm

Cornelis Dusart (April 24, 1660 – October 1, 1704) was a Dutch genre painter, drawer (artists), and printmaker.

He was born in Haarlem. Dusart was a pupil of Adriaen van Ostade from about 1675 to 1679, and was accepted into the Haarlem Guild of St. Luke in 1679. His works are similar in style and subject to those of his mentor. Especially notable are his highly finished drawings of peasants, depicted singly in colored chalks and watercolor. He died in Haarlem.
