= Oudendijk =

Oudendijk can refer to:

- Oudendijk, Korendijk, in the municipality of Hoeksche Waard, South Holland
- Oudendijk, Strijen, in the municipality of Hoeksche Waard, South Holland
- Oudendijk, North Holland, in the municipality of Koggenland
- Oudendijk, North Brabant, in the municipality of Altena, North Brabant

== See also ==
- Oudendijck
