= Linda Grace Hoyer Updike =

American writer (1904–1989)

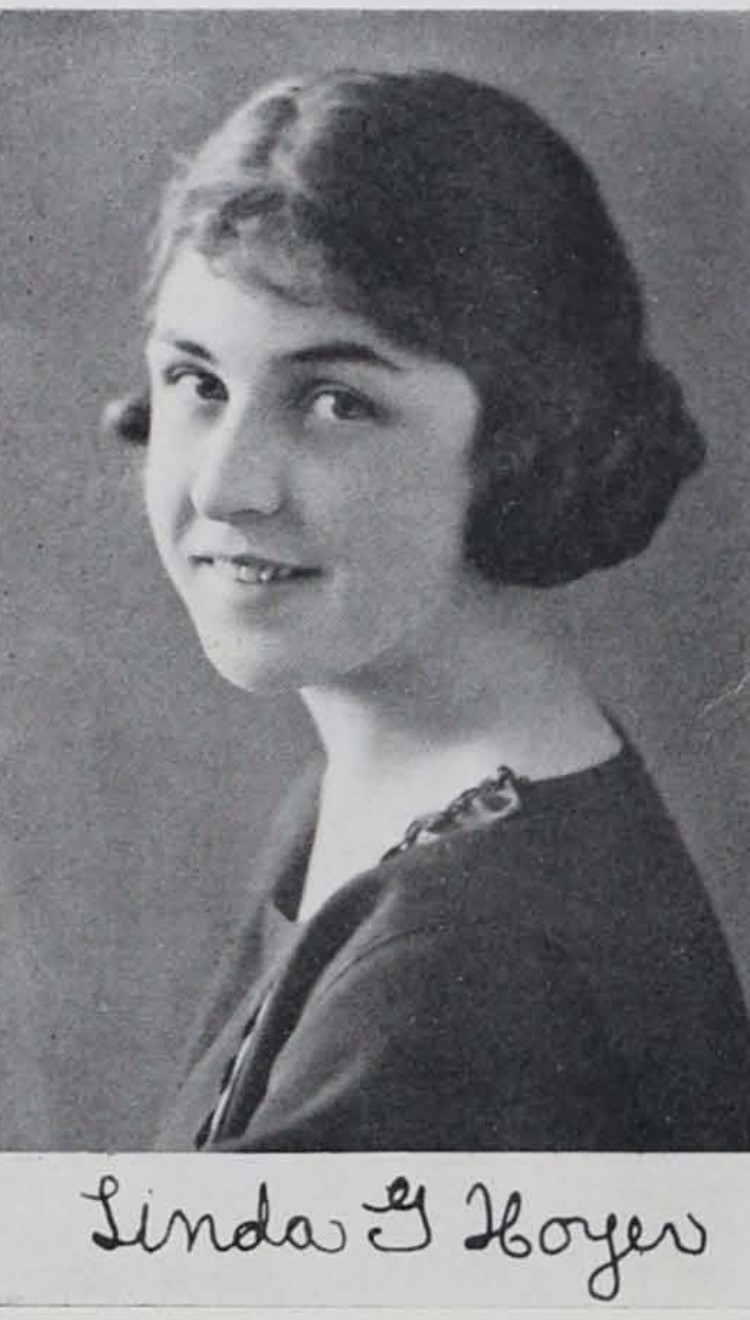
Linda Hoyer Updike, 1923 yearbook photo

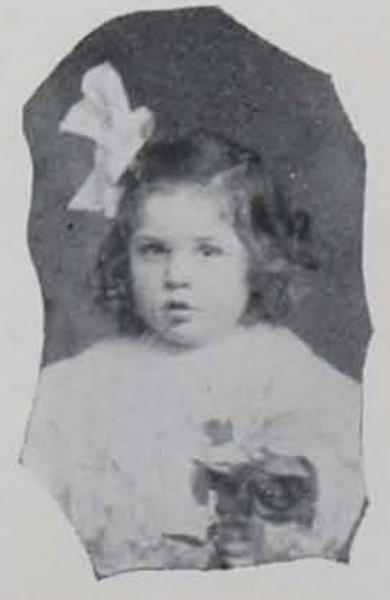
Linda Hoyer Updike baby photo in yearbook

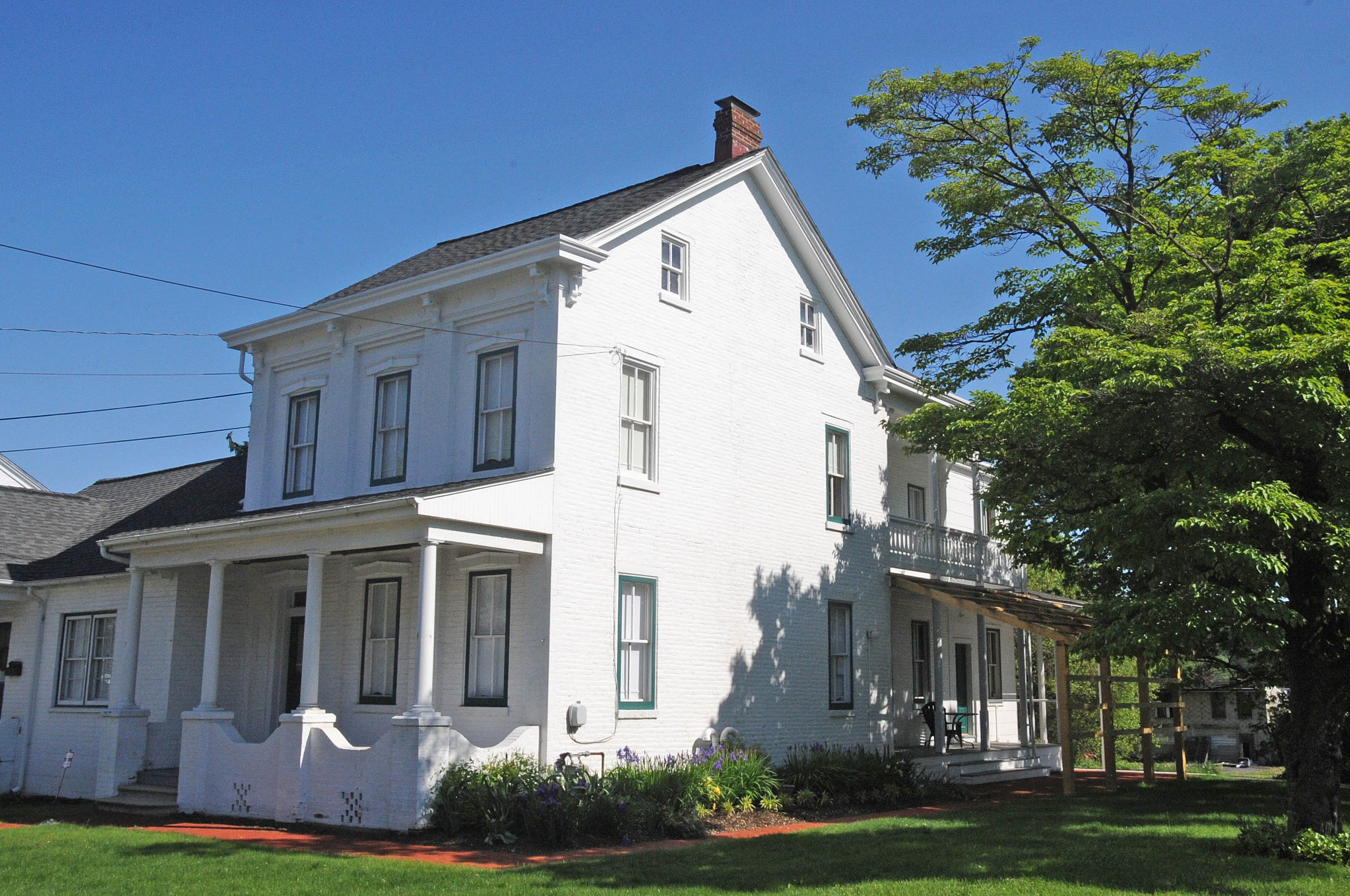
Her home in Shillington

Linda Grace Hoyer Updike (1904–1989) was an American writer from Plowville, Pennsylvania. She was the mother of the writer John Updike and grandmother of the writer David Updike. Linda Updike also served as the model for several of her son's characters, including one of the main characters in the novel Of the Farm.

== Early life and education ==
Linda Grace Hoyer (Updike) was born on June 20, 1904, on an 83-acre farm in Plowville, Pennsylvania, the only child of John Hoyer and Katherine Kramer Hoyer, who were of mainly German ancestry. The family attended Grace Evangelical Lutheran Church. Her parents sold their farm in 1921 and moved a large house in the nearby town of Shillington, Pennsylvania. Updike graduated from Keystone Normal School (now Kutztown University), and in 1923, at age 19, from Ursinus College, where she played field hockey. In 1924 she received a M.A. in English literature from Cornell University, where she wrote a thesis on Sir Walter Scott's The Bride of Lammermoor.

== Marriage and birth of John Updike ==
Updike married her Ursinus classmate, Wesley Russell Updike, in 1925, and their only child, John, was born in 1932. Wesley Updike worked as a cable tester for AT&T until being laid off during the Great Depression. He then became a math teacher in Shillington. When John was 18 months old, Linda began working at Pomeroy's Department store in the drapery department, while trying unsuccessfully to publish fiction in various publications for many years, which made an impression on her son. The Updikes lived with her parents in Shillington while John was young. During World War II, Linda worked at a parachute factory and saved enough money to buy back her family farm and move the family to Plowville in 1945, to her son's chagrin.

== Later writer career, death and legacy ==
Updike published her first of ten pieces in The New Yorker in 1961, and in 1971 her novel Enchantment was published. Her manuscript of a historical novel about Ponce De Leon remains unpublished as of 2022, despite being her magnum opus, which she worked on for many years. Updike died at her farm in Plowville in 1989 and was buried at Robeson Lutheran Church Cemetery. In 1990, Updike's semi-autobiographical collection of stories The Predator was published posthumously with illustrations by her granddaughter Elizabeth Updike Cobblah. Many of her papers are held at Ursinus College, to which her son donated them.
