= Evert Oudendijck =

Dutch Golden Age painter

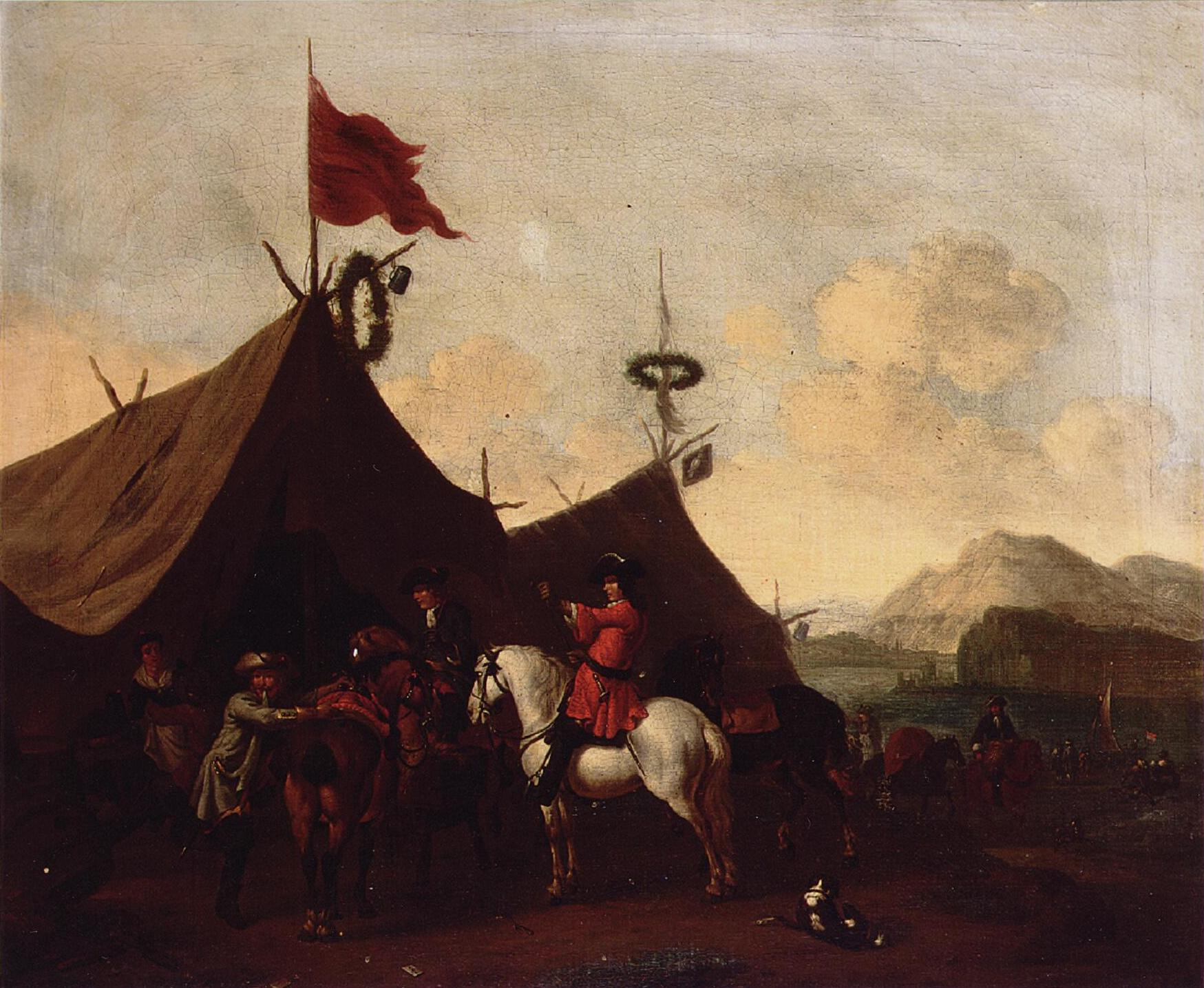
Soldiers resting outside their encampment

Evert Oudendijck (1650–1695) was a Dutch Golden Age painter.

== Biography ==
Oudendijck was born and died in Haarlem. According to Houbraken, he painted stag hunts and other hunting scenes in landscapes, along with the artist "Drossaart". He was the father of Adriaen Oudendijck.

According to the RKD he was registered in the Haarlem Guild of St. Luke in 1663 as the pupil of Adriaen van Ostade which would make him about 15 years old at that time. His registration as a member of the guild in 1646 is therefore impossible.

Though Evert Oudendijk is listed in the Haarlem guild register as a member in 1646, he probably became a member in 1664 (a year suspiciously lacking member registrations), like other members mistakenly registered in 1646, such as Evert Collier and Egbert van Heemskerck. He is listed two other times in the Haarlem guild; in 1663 (listed as Ostade's pupil "Evert Adriaanszen van Oudendijck") and as painter in 1670.
