= Mary Pennington (Updike) Weatherall =

American visual artist

Mary Pennington (Updike) Weatherall (January 26, 1930 - February 25, 2018) was a visual artist and the first wife of John Updike. Many of Updike's early characters were modeled after her, particularly in his short stories about the Maple family and his novel Couples. Weatherall was the mother of artist Elizabeth Updike Cobblah and writer David Updike, and the maternal aunt of poet Molly Fisk.

== Early life and education ==
Mary Entwistle Pennington was born on January 26, 1930, in Braintree, Massachusetts, to Unitarian minister Leslie Talbot Pennington and Elizabeth Entwistle Daniels, a Latin teacher. She had one sibling, a younger sister, Antoinette Pennington Fisk, and they grew up in Cambridge, where Weatherall attended the Shady Hill School and Buckingham Browne & Nichols School where she played field hockey and enjoyed ice skating. Weatherall graduated from Radcliffe College in 1952.

== Life with John Updike ==
In 1953 she married John Updike, a Harvard student, who she met during an art class her senior year. After his graduation, they both studied art at Oxford University's Ruskin School of Drawing, where their first child, Elizabeth, was born. They lived in New York for two years while John wrote for the New Yorker and then moved to Ipswich, Massachusetts, in 1957, where they raised their four children, Elizabeth, David, Michael, and Miranda. Weatherall was active in the Civil Rights movement and participated in the 1965 Selma to Montgomery marches. She and Updike separated in 1974 and divorced in 1976.

== Later life and career ==
After her divorce, she worked for Atlantic Monthly reading poetry and studied at Montserrat College of Art. In 1982, she married longtime family friend Robert Weatherall. A recent widower, Weatherall had started as an academic in England and continued his career at MIT. Mary was a popular landscape painter as well as being active in the civil rights movement, participating in one of the Selma marches.

Shortly after celebrating her 88th birthday with family at the historic Hart House, Weatherall came down with pneumonia. Her children, seven grandchildren, and great-grandson gathered before she died in her home on February 25, 2018. Many of her papers are held at Harvard University.
