= Plowville, Pennsylvania =

Unincorporated area in Pennsylvania, U.S.

Coordinates: 40°12′51″N 75°54′33″W

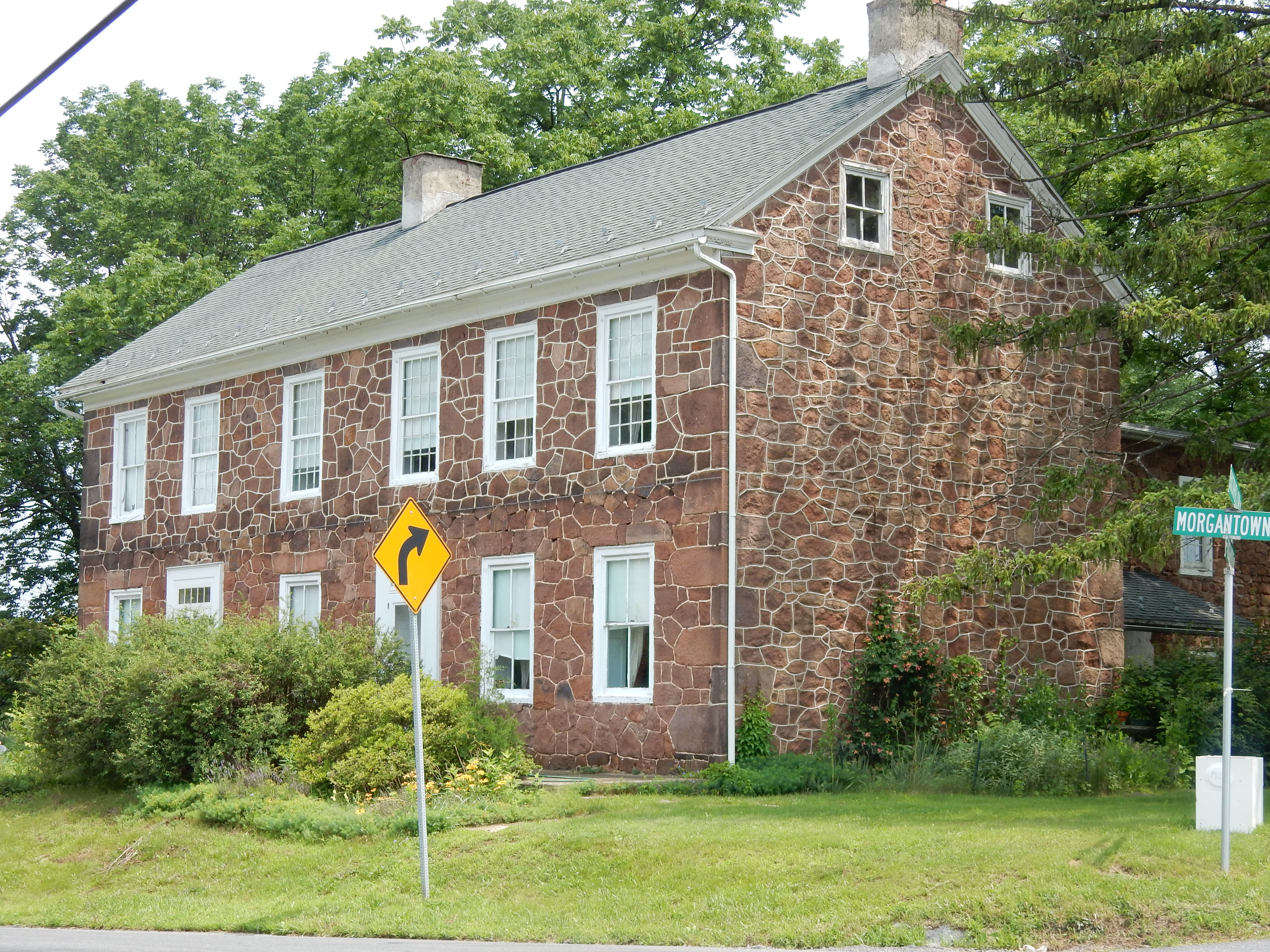
Morgantown Rd. in Plowville

Plowville is an unincorporated area of Robeson Township, Berks County, Pennsylvania, United States. It is located on Pennsylvania Route 10, just east of Interstate 176. Its zip code is 19540 and the community is served by the Twin Valley School District. The most recognizable landmark is Plow Church.

== History ==
A post office called Plowville was established in 1894, and remained in office until 1911. The community was named after the Plow Tavern, which was recognized by its sign with the image of a plow.

== Notable people ==
Linda Grace Hoyer Updike, the mother of author and novelist John Updike and herself an author, was born and died in the house near Plowville where Updike himself lived during his adolescence; the house and surrounding region are described in great detail in Of the Farm and in many of Updike's short stories, essays, and memoirs. She and Updike's father, Wesley, are buried in the cemetery of Robeson Lutheran (Plow) church in Plowville.
