= Adriaen van Ostade =

Dutch painter (1610–1685)

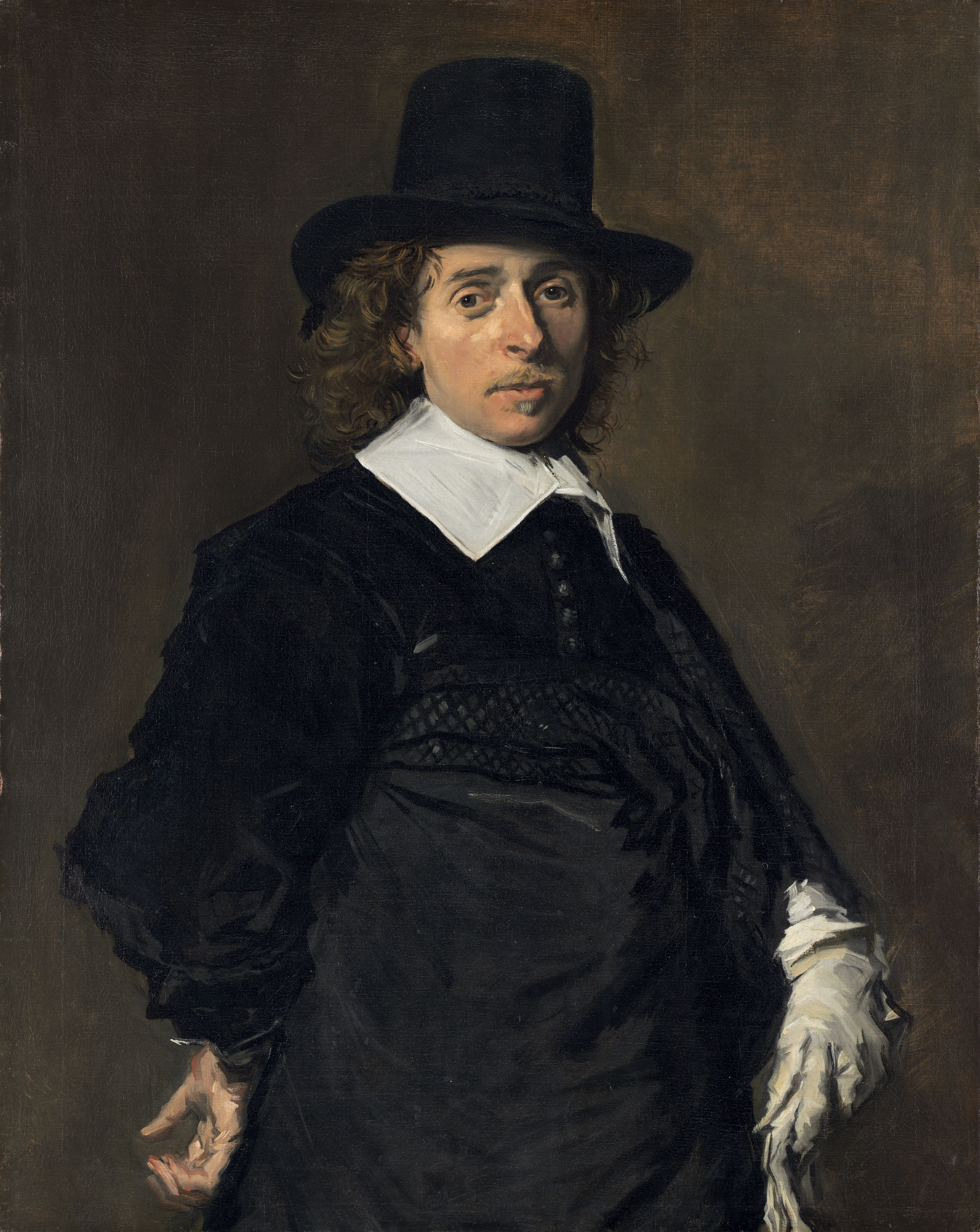
- Portrait by Frans Hals, c. 1645/48
- Born: 10 December 1610 (baptized); Haarlem, Netherlands
- Died: 2 May 1685 (buried); Haarlem, Netherlands
- Known for: Painting

Adriaen van Ostade (baptized as Adriaen Jansz Hendricx 10 December 1610 – buried 2 May 1685) was a Dutch Golden Age painter of genre works, showing the everyday life of ordinary men and women.

== Life ==
Peasants in a Tavern (c. 1635), at the Alte Pinakothek, Munich

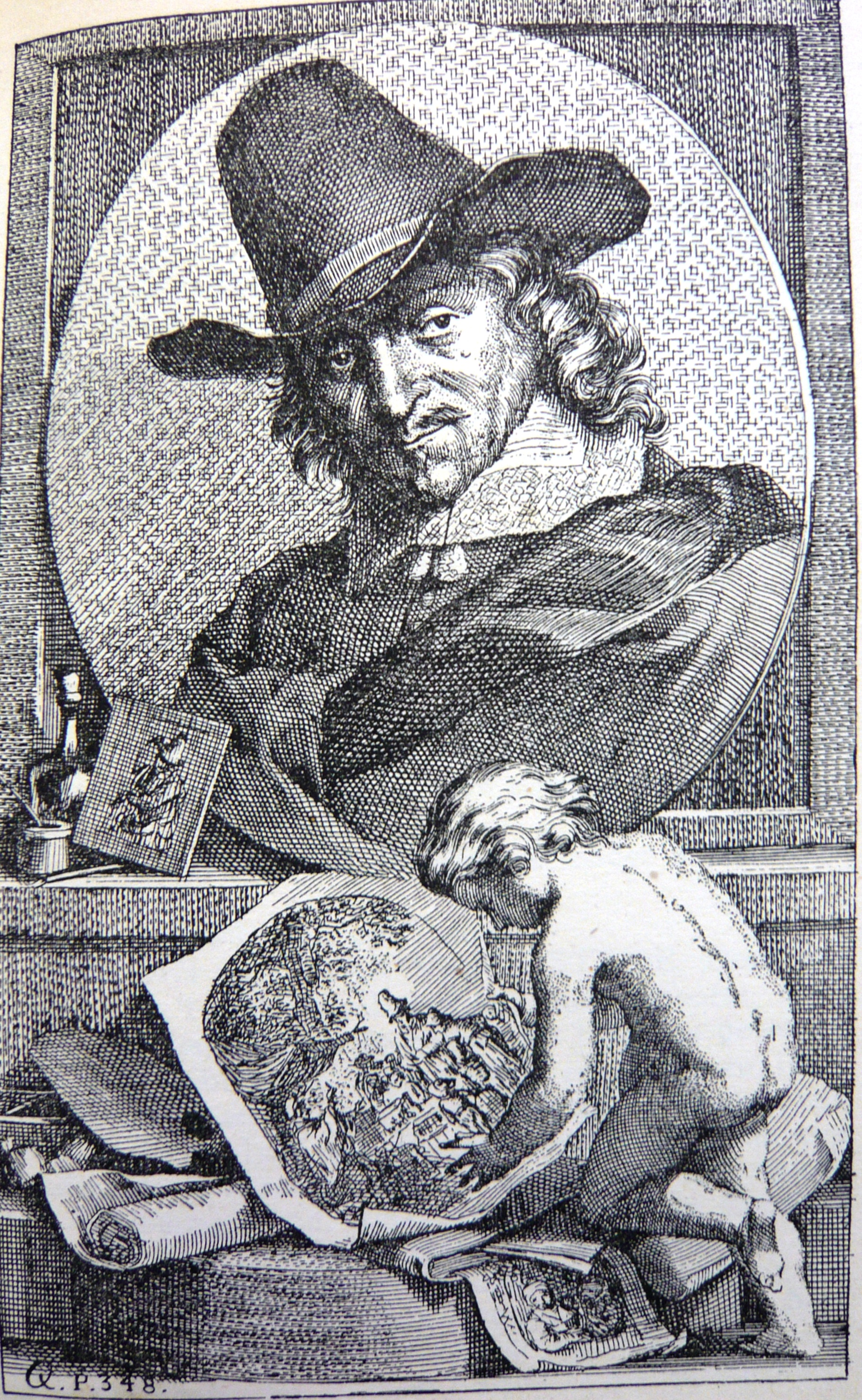
Engraved portrait of Adriaen van Ostade, shown with a few of his more famous works, by Arnold Houbraken in his "Schouburg", volume I, 1718

According to Arnold Houbraken, he and his brother were pupils of Frans Hals and like him, spent most of their lives in Haarlem. He thought they were "Lubekkers" by birth, though this has since found to be false. He was the eldest son of Jan Hendricx Ostade, a weaver from the hamlet of Ostade near Eindhoven. Although Adriaen and his brother Isaack were born in Haarlem, they adopted the name "van Ostade" as painters. According to the RKD, he became a pupil in 1627 of the portrait painter Frans Hals, at that time the master of Jan Miense Molenaer. In 1632, he is registered in Utrecht (where, like Jacob Duck, he was probably influenced by the village scenes of Joost Cornelisz Droochsloot, which were popular in his day), but in 1634 he was back in Haarlem where he joined the Haarlem Guild of St. Luke. Aged 26, he joined a company of the civic guard at Haarlem, and at twenty-eight he married. His wife died two years later in 1640. In 1657, "as a widower", he married Anna Ingels. He again became a widower in 1666. He opened a workshop and took on pupils. His notable pupils were Cornelis Pietersz Bega, Cornelis Dusart, Jan de Groot, Frans de Jongh, Michiel van Musscher, Isaac van Ostade, Evert Oudendijck, and Jan Steen.

In 1662 and again in 1663, he is registered as deacon of the St. Luke guild in Haarlem. In the rampjaar (1672), he packed up his goods with the intention of fleeing to Lübeck, which is why Houbraken felt he had family there. He got as far as Amsterdam, however, when he was convinced to stay by the art collector Konstantyn Sennepart, in whose house he stayed, and where he made a series of colored drawings, that were later bought for 1300 florins (along with some drawings by Gerrit Battem) by Jonas Witsen, where Houbraken saw them and fell in love with his portrayals of village life. Jonas Witsen (1676–1715) was the man who convinced Houbraken to move to Amsterdam from Dordrecht. He had been the city secretary and was probably his patron. His successor, Johan van Schuylenburgh, who became city secretary in 1712, was the man to whom Houbraken dedicated the first volume of his Schouburg.

== Work ==
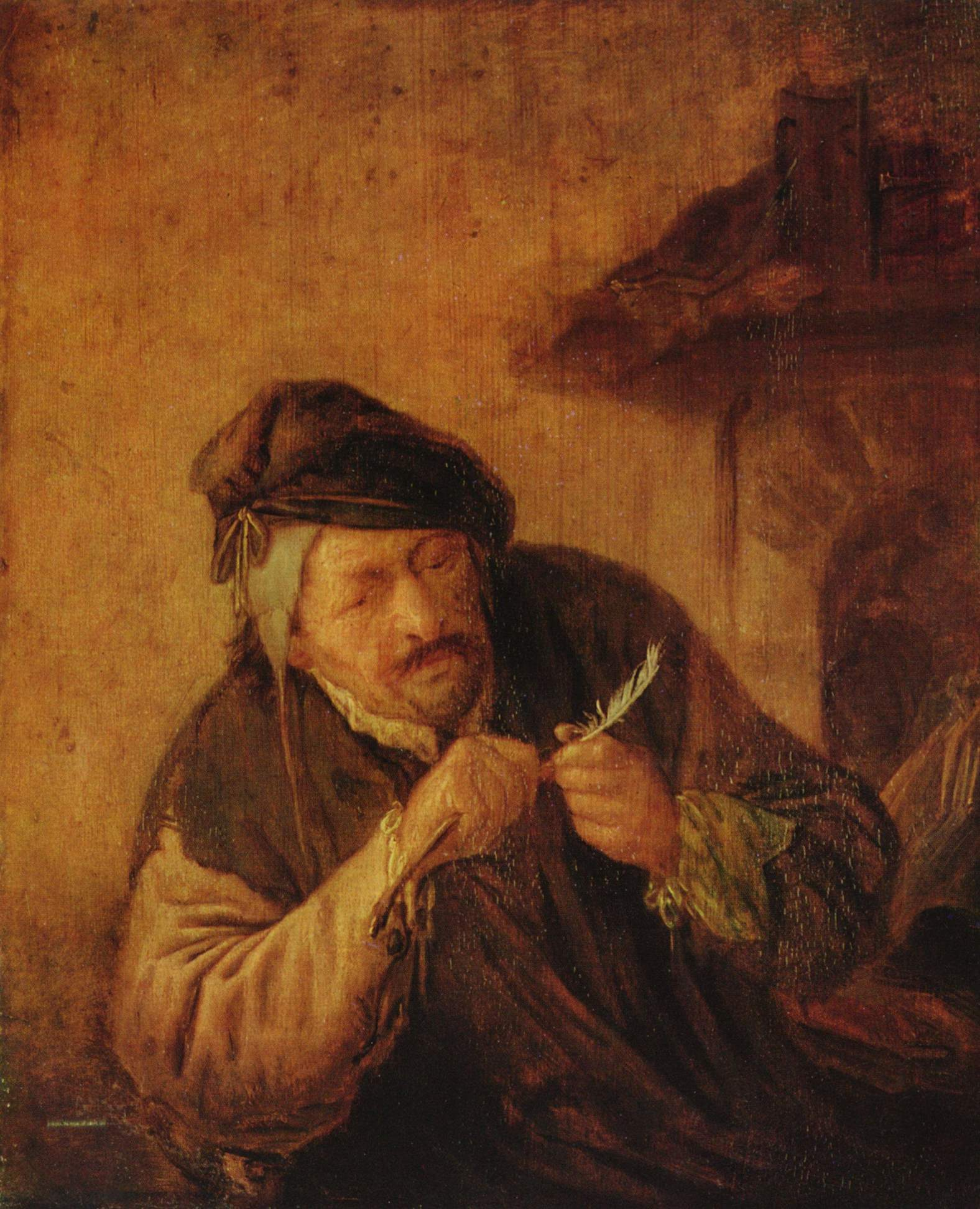
"Cutting the Feather" c. 1660, at the Museum of Fine Arts, Budapest

Ostade was the contemporary of the Flemish painters David Teniers the Younger and Adriaen Brouwer. Like them, he spent his life in delineation of ordinary life, depicting tavern scenes, village fairs and country quarters. Between Teniers and Ostade the contrast lies in the different condition of the agricultural classes of Brabant and Holland and in the atmosphere and dwellings peculiar to each region. Brabant has more sun and more comfort; Teniers, in consequence, is silvery and sparkling, and the people he paints are fair specimens of their culture. Holland, in the vicinity of Haarlem, seems to have suffered much from war; the air is moist and hazy, and the people depicted by Ostade are short and ill-favoured, marked with adversity's stamp in feature and dress.

Brouwer, who painted the peasant in his frolics and passions, brought more of the spirit of Frans Hals into his depictions than did his colleague; but the type is the same as Ostade's. During the first years of his career, Ostade tended toward the same exaggeration and frolic as his comrade, though he is distinguished from his rival by a more general use of light and shade, especially a greater concentration of light on a small surface in contrast with a broad expanse of gloom. The key of his harmonies remained for a time in the scale of greys, but his treatment is dry and careful in a style which shuns no difficulties of detail. He shows us the cottages, inside and out: vine leaves cloak the poverty of the outer walls; indoors, nothing decorates the patchwork of rafters and thatch, the tumble-down chimneys and the ladder staircases, the rustic Dutch home of those days. The greatness of Ostade lies in how often he caught the poetic side of the peasant class in spite of its coarseness. He gave the magic light of a sun-gleam to their lowly sports, their quarrels, even their quieter moods of enjoyment; he clothed the wreck of the cottages with colourful vegetation.

It was natural, given the tendency to effect which marked Ostade from the first, that he should have been fired by emulation to rival the masterpieces of Rembrandt. His early pictures are not so rare but that we can trace how he glided from one period to the other. Before the dispersal of the Jakob Gsell collection at Vienna in 1872, it was easy to study the steel-grey harmonies, the exaggerated caricature of his early works between 1632 and 1638. There is a picture in the Vienna Gallery of a Countryman Having his Tooth Drawn, unsigned, and painted about 1632; a "Bagpiper" of 1635 in the Liechtenstein Gallery at Vienna; cottage scenes of 1635 and 1636 in the museums of Karlsruhe, Darmstadt, and Dresden; and the Card Players of 1637 in the Liechtenstein palace at Vienna, making up for the loss of the Gsell collection. The same style marks most of those pieces.

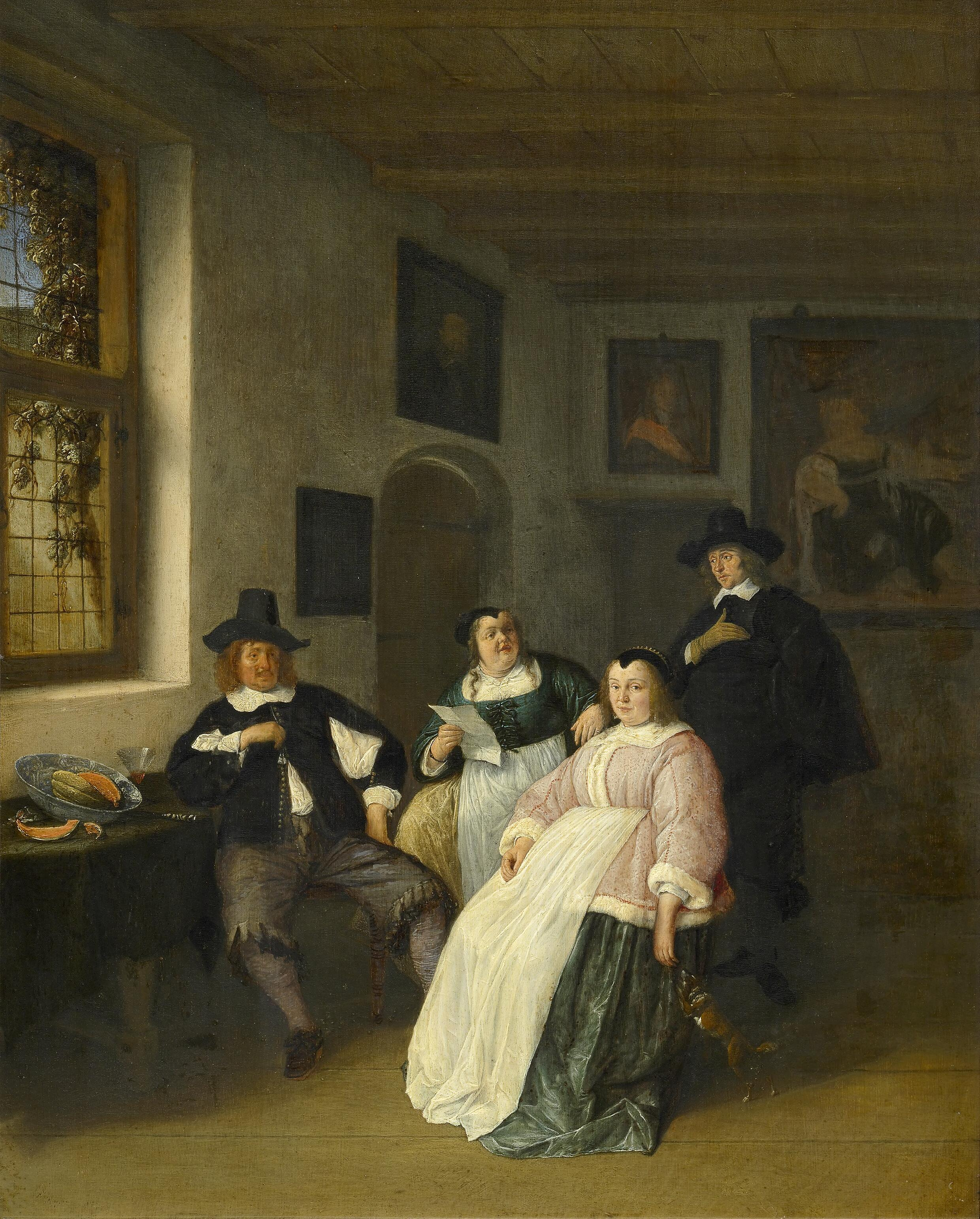
The painter with the De Goyer family (around 1652), at the Museum Bredius, The Hague

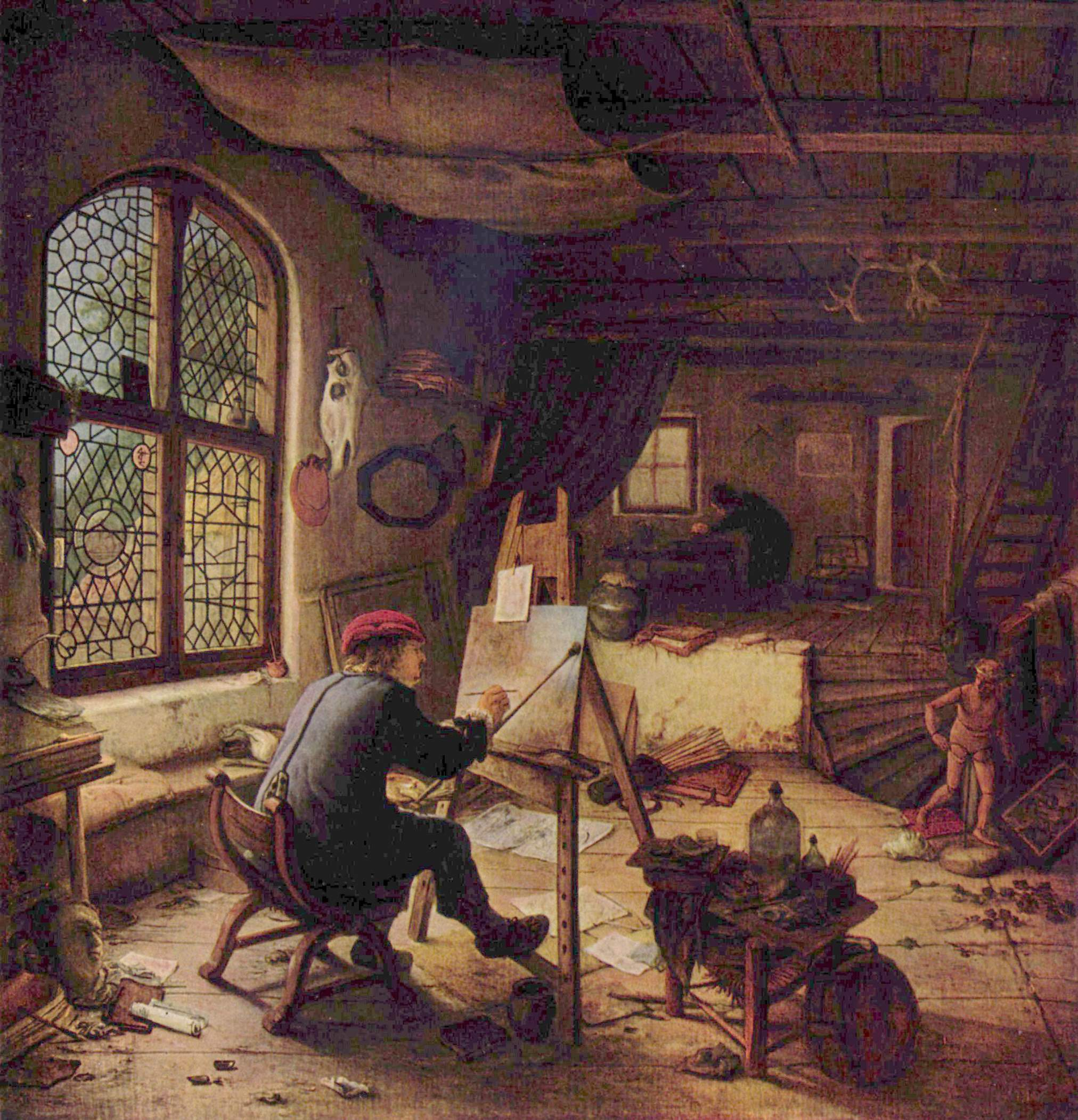
The painter in his workshop (selfportrait) (1663), at the Semper Gallery, Dresden

About 1638 or 1640, the influence of Rembrandt suddenly changed his style. He painted the Annunciation of the Brunswick Museum: angels, appearing in the sky to Dutch boors half-asleep amidst their cattle, sheep and dogs in front of a cottage, recall at once the similar subject by Rembrandt, who effectively lighted the principal groups by rays propelled to earth from a murky sky. Ostade, however, did not succeed here in giving dramatic force and expression; his shepherds were without much emotion, passion or surprise. His picture was an effect of light, and masterly as such, in its sketchy rubbings of dark brown tone relieved by strongly impasted lights, but without the very qualities which made his usual subjects attractive.

In 1642 he painted the beautiful interior at the Louvre: a mother tending her cradled child, her husband sitting nearby, beside a great chimney; the darkness of a country loft dimly illumined by a sunbeam shining on the casement. One might think the painter intended to depict the Nativity; but there is nothing holy in the surroundings, nothing attractive, indeed, except the wonderful Rembrandtesque transparency, the brownish tone, and the admirable keeping of the minutest parts. Ostade was more at home in a similar effect applied to the commonplace incident of the Slaughtering of a Pig, one of the masterpieces of 1643, and once in the Gsell collection. In this and similar subjects of the previous and succeeding years, he returned to the homely themes in which his power and wonderful observation had made him a master. He does not seem to have gone back to gospel illustrations until 1667, when he produced an admirable Nativity which is only surpassed in arrangement and colour by Rembrandt's Carpenter's Family at the Louvre, or by the Woodcutter and Children in the gallery of Cassel. Almost innumerable are the more familiar themes to which he devoted his brush during this interval: from small single figures, representing smokers or drinkers, to allegories of the five senses (Hermitage and Brunswick galleries), half-lengths of fishmongers and bakers, cottage brawls, scenes of gambling, itinerant players and quacks, and ninepins players in the open air.

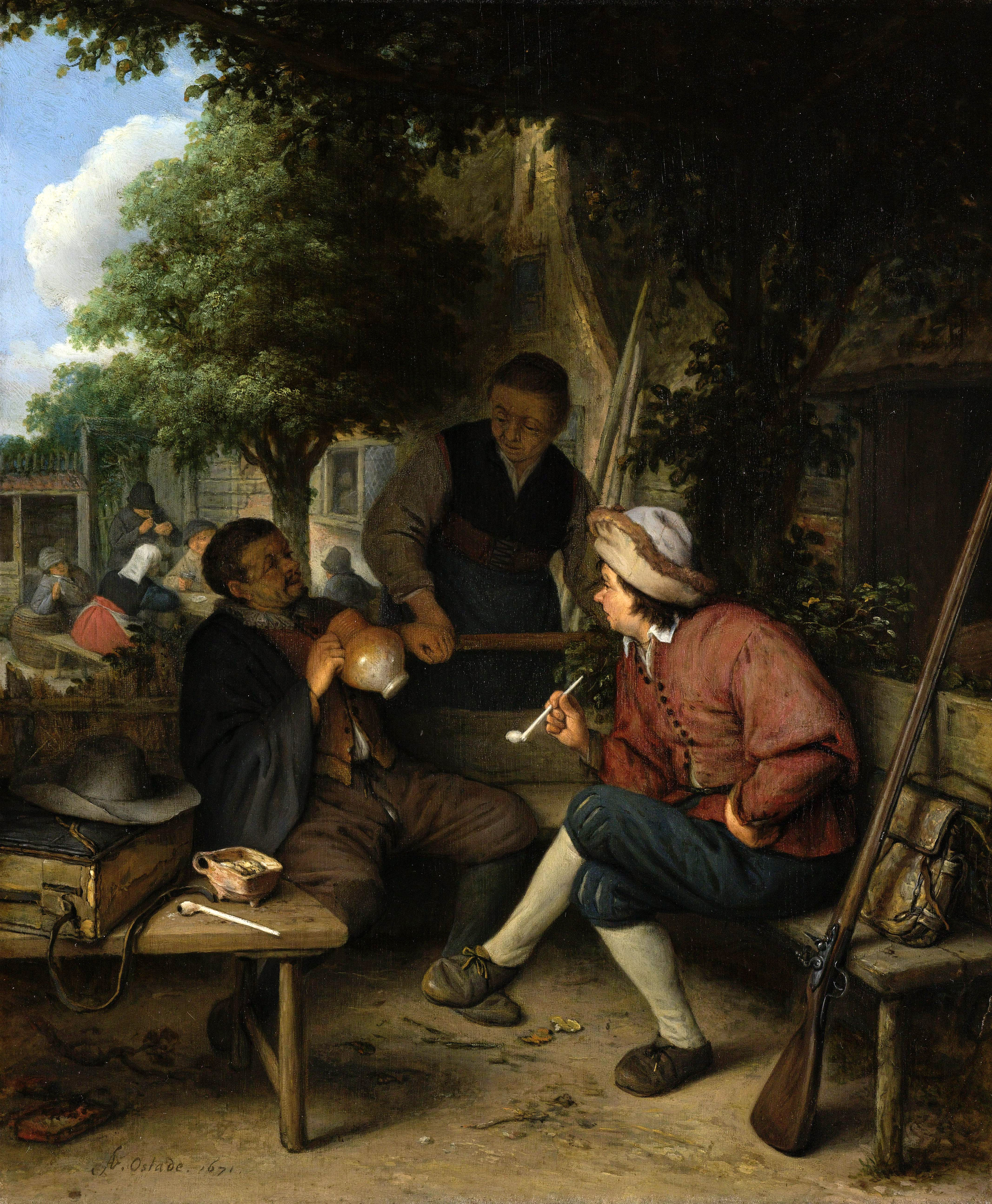
Resting Travelers (1671), at the Rijksmuseum, Amsterdam

The humor in some of these pieces is contagious, as in the Tavern Scene of the La Caze Collection (Louvre, 1653). His art may be studied in the large series of dated pieces which adorn every European capital from Saint Petersburg to London. Buckingham Palace has a large number, and many a good specimen lies hidden in private collections in England. Should we select a few as peculiarly worthy of attention, we might point to the Rustics in a Tavern of 1662 at The Hague, the Village School of the same year at the Louvre, the Tavern Court-yard of 1670 at Cassel, the Sportsmen's Rest of 1671 at Amsterdam, and the Fiddler and his Audience of 1673 at the Hague.

At Amsterdam we have the likeness of a painter, sitting with his back to the spectator, at his easel. The colour-grinder is at work in a corner, a pupil prepares a palette, and a black dog sleeps on the ground. A replica of this picture, with the date 1666, is in the Dresden gallery. Both depictions are supposed to represent Ostade himself, but unfortunately we see the artist's back and not his face. In an etching (Bartsch, 32), the painter shows himself in profile at work on a canvas. Two of his latest dated works, the Village Street and the Skittle Players, noteworthy items in the Ashburton and Ellesmere collections, were executed in 1676 without any sign of declining powers. He died in 1685 in Haarlem.

== Legacy ==
The number of Ostade's pictures was given by the art dealer John Smith at 385, but by Hofstede de Groot (1910) at over 900. At his death, the stock of his unsold pieces was over 200. His engraved plates were put up to auction with the pictures. Fifty etched plates, most of them dated 1647–1648, were disposed of in 1686. there are 220 of his pictures in public and private collections, of which 104 are signed and dated, while seventeen are signed with the name but not with the date. The prices which Ostade received are not known; but pictures which were worth £40 in 1750 were worth £1,000 a century later, and Earl Dudley gave £4,120 for a cottage interior in 1876.

The signatures of Ostade vary at different periods, but the first two letters are generally interlaced. Up to 1635, Ostade writes himself Ostaden, e.g. in the Bagpiper of 1635 in the Liechtenstein collection at Vienna. Later on, he uses the long s (ſ), and occasionally he signs in capital letters. His pupils are his own brother Isaack, Cornelis Bega, Cornelis Dusart, and Richard Brakenburg.

== List of works ==
- Barber Extracting a Tooth
- The Fish Market
- Customers Conversing in a Tavern
