= Adriaen Oudendijck =

Dutch painter

Adriaen Oudendijck (1677, Haarlem – 1704, Haarlem), was a Dutch Golden Age landscape painter.

== Biography ==
According to Houbraken he copied the cattle in his landscapes after leading landscape artists such as the painter Adriaen van de Velde and the figures after leading portrait painters such as Thomas Wyck, and this copycat behavior earned him the nickname "Rapianus".

According to the RKD he was the second son of the landscape painter Evert and worked together with the painter Dirk Maas, possibly in the same studio from 1695 to 1700. In 1700 he became a member of the Haarlem Guild of St. Luke. He is not to be confused with a printmaker by the same name.
