= David Updike =

American writer and academic

David Updike (born 1957) is an American writer and academic. Updike is the son of author John Updike, who used him as a model for characters in several works of fiction, including Wife-wooing, Avec la Bebe-sitter, Son, and Separating.

David Updike is the second child of John Updike and Mary Pennington (Updike) Weatherall. He grew up largely in Ipswich, Massachusetts, and graduated from Harvard University in 1980 with an art history degree and from Columbia University in 1984 with an M.A.T. In 1978, Updike published the first of nine pieces in The New Yorker. In 1988, he published a collection of short stories, Out on the Marsh, and he later published a four-piece set of young-adult books, A Winter Journey, An Autumn Tale, A Spring Story, and The Sounds of Summer. In 2006, he published a novel, Ivy's Turn, about interracial relationships in the 1990s and the civil rights movement of the 1960s. In 2009, Updike published another collection of short stories, Old Girlfriends. In addition to his pieces in The New Yorker, Updike has published short stories in Epiphany, Sargasso, Harper's, and The New York Times Magazine. He provided the photographs for his father's children's book, A Helpful Alphabet of Friendly Objects. Updike has taught creative writing at M.I.T. and is a professor of English at Roxbury Community College. His wife, Wambui, is a native of Kenya, and they live in Cambridge, Massachusetts. Updike considers his literary career more similar to that of his grandmother, Linda Grace Hoyer Updike, than to his father's.
