= John Updike bibliography =

The following is the complete bibliography of John Updike (March 18, 1932 – January 27, 2009), an American novelist, poet, critic and essayist noted for his prolific output over a 50-year period. His bibliography includes some 23 novels, 18 short story collections, 12 collections of poetry, 4 children's books, and 12 collections of non-fiction.

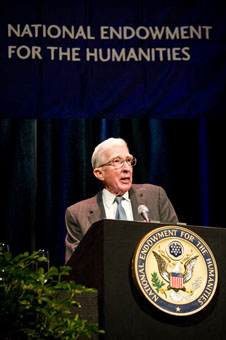
John Updike in 2008.

== Chronological listing ==
Novels are highlighted in bold.

Title	Year	Type	Notes
The Carpentered Hen and Other Tame Creatures	1958	poetry	collected in Collected Poems: 1953–1993 (1993)
**The Poorhouse Fair**	1959	novel	reprinted in 1977
The Same Door	1959	short stories	collected in The Early Stories: 1953–1975 (2003)
**Rabbit, Run**	1960	novel	collected in Rabbit Angstrom: The Four Novels (1995)
Pigeon Feathers	1962	short stories	collected in The Early Stories: 1953–1975 (2003)
The Magic Flute	1962	children's book	
Telephone Poles and Other Poems	1963	poetry	collected in Collected Poems: 1953–1993 (1993)
**The Centaur**	1963	novel	
Olinger Stories: A Selection	1964	short stories	all previously collected
The Ring	1964	children's book	
**Of the Farm**	1965	novel	
Assorted Prose	1965	non-fiction	
Verse	1965	poetry	collects The Carpentered Hen and Telephone Poles
A Child's Calendar	1965	poetry	reprinted in 1999; collected in Collected Poems: 1953–1993 (1993)
The Music School	1966	short stories	collected in The Early Stories: 1953–1975 (2003)
**Couples**	1968	novel	
Three Texts from Early Ipswich	1968	non-fiction	
Midpoint and Other Poems	1969	poetry	collected in Collected Poems: 1953–1993 (1993)
Bottom's Dream	1969	children's book	
Bech: A Book	1970	short stories	collected in The Complete Henry Bech (2001)
**Rabbit Redux**	1971	novel	collected in Rabbit Angstrom: The Four Novels (1995)
Museums and Women and Other Stories	1972	short stories	collected in The Early Stories: 1953–1975 (2003)
Buchanan Dying	1974	play	reprinted in 2000
Cunts	1974	poetry	limited edition chapbook
**A Month of Sundays**	1975	novel	part of The Scarlet Letter trilogy
Picked-Up Pieces	1975	non-fiction	
**Marry Me**	1976	novel	
Tossing and Turning	1977	poetry	collected in Collected Poems: 1953–1993 (1993)
**The Coup**	1978	novel	
Too Far to Go	1979	short stories	reprinted as The Maples Stories in 2009
Problems and Other Stories	1979	short stories	
**Rabbit Is Rich**	1981	novel	collected in Rabbit Angstrom: The Four Novels (1995)
Bech Is Back	1982	short stories	collected in The Complete Henry Bech (2001)
Hugging the Shore	1983	non-fiction	
**The Witches of Eastwick**	1984	novel	
Facing Nature	1985	poetry	collected in Collected Poems: 1953–1993 (1993)
Impressions	1985	non-fiction	published by Sylvester & Orphanos
**Roger's Version**	1986	novel	part of The Scarlet Letter trilogy
Trust Me	1987	short stories	
**S.**	1988	novel	part of The Scarlet Letter trilogy
Just Looking: Essays on Art	1989	non-fiction	reprinted in 2000
Self-Consciousness: Memoirs	1989	non-fiction	
**Rabbit at Rest**	1990	novel	collected in Rabbit Angstrom: The Four Novels (1995)
Odd Jobs	1991	non-fiction	
**Memories of the Ford Administration**	1992	novel	
Collected Poems: 1953–1993	1993	poetry	
**Brazil**	1994	novel	
The Afterlife and Other Stories	1994	short stories	
Rabbit Angstrom: The Four Novels	1995	novels	collects the Rabbit novels
A Helpful Alphabet of Friendly Objects	1995	children's book	
**In the Beauty of the Lilies**	1996	novel	
Golf Dreams: Writings on Golf	1996	non-fiction	
**Toward the End of Time**	1997	novel	
Bech at Bay: A Quasi-Novel	1998	short stories	collected in The Complete Henry Bech (2001)
More Matter: Essays and Criticism	1999	non-fiction	
**Gertrude and Claudius**	2000	novel	
On Literary Biography	2000	non-fiction	limited edition
Licks of Love: Short Stories and a Sequel	2000	short stories	includes the final entry in the Rabbit saga, Rabbit Remembered
Humor in Fiction	2001	non-fiction	limited edition
The Complete Henry Bech	2001	short stories	collects the Bech books
Americana and Other Poems	2001	poetry	
**Rabbit Remembered**	2001	novella	
**Seek My Face**	2002	novel	
The Early Stories: 1953–1975	2003	short stories	collects previously published collections
Not Cancelled Yet	2003	poetry	limited edition
**Villages**	2004	novel	
Still Looking: Essays on American Art	2005	non-fiction	
**Terrorist**	2006	novel	
Due Considerations: Essays and Criticism	2007	non-fiction	
**The Widows of Eastwick**	2008	novel	
Endpoint and Other Poems	2009	poetry	posthumous publication
My Father's Tears and Other Stories	2009	short stories	posthumous publication
The Maples Stories	2009	short stories	posthumous publication; reprint of Too Far to Go (1979)
Hub Fans Bid Kid Adieu: John Updike on Ted Williams	2010	non-fiction	posthumous publication; Library of America
Higher Gossip	2011	non-fiction	posthumous publication
Always Looking	2012	non-fiction	posthumous publication
The Collected Stories	2013	short stories	posthumous publication; 186 stories in two volumes; Library of America
Selected Letters	2025	correspondence	posthumous publication

== Library of America editions ==
After publishing the essay "Hub Fans Bid Kid Adieu" as a standalone special edition book in 2010, and publishing two volumes of short stories in 2013 (available also as a boxed set), Library of America began a multi-volume edition of Updike's novels in 2018, all under the editorship of Christopher Carduff.

Title	Year	Notes
Collected Early Stories	2013	102 stories written from 1953 to 1975 (LOA #242)
Collected Later Stories	2013	84 stories written from 1976 to 2008 (LOA #243)
Novels 1959‒1965	2018	The Poorhouse Fair, Rabbit, Run, The Centaur, Of the Farm (LOA #311)
Novels 1968‒1975	2020	Couples, Rabbit Redux, A Month of Sundays (LOA #326)
Novels 1978-1984	2021	The Coup, Rabbit is Rich, The Witches of Eastwick (LOA #339)
Novels 1986–1990	2022	Roger's Version, Rabbit at Rest (LOA #354)
Novels 1996–2000	2023	In the Beauty of the Lilies, Gertrude and Claudius, Rabbit Remembered (LOA #365)

== See also ==
- Alfred A. Knopf
- Bibliography of Philip Roth
- The New Yorker
