= Tossing and turning =

Tossing and turning may refer to:

- Tossing and turning in bed while attempting to fall asleep; see insomnia
- Tossing and turning of vegetables or other food while sautéing
- "Tossin' and Turnin'", a 1960 song by Bobby Lewis
- "Tossing and Turning" (The Ivy League song), 1965 song by The Ivy League
- "Tossing and Turning" (Windjammer song), 1984 song by the american band Windjammer
- Tossing and Turning, a 1977 book of poetry by John Updike
