= Toward the End of Time =

1997 post-apocalyptic science fiction novel by American author John Updike

First edition (published by Knopf).

Toward the End of Time is a novel by American writer John Updike, published in 1997. It is his 18th novel.

== Brief synopsis ==
Set in New England, like many of Updike's novels, Toward the End of Time portrays a world in which the Chinese and the United States have attacked one another with nuclear weapons. The aftermath is shown through retired investment advisor Ben Turnbull's journal. Though the dollar and the central government are gone, life in Boston and the surrounding areas goes on thanks to FedEx and other less reputable entrepreneurs.

== Plot summary ==
The book has five parts:

i. The Deer
ii. The Dollhouse
iii. The Deal
iv. The Deaths
v. The Dahlia.

i. The Deer Ben expresses his uneasiness about his wife Gloria's obsession with killing the deer that is ravaging her picture-perfect garden. Clearly unhappy with Gloria, Ben begins an affair with a prostitute named Deirdre.

ii. The Dollhouse Ben believes he has slid into an alternate universe when Gloria disappears and Deirdre takes her place. Ben has the vague impression he may have shot and killed Gloria. Spin and Phil, young thugs who collect protection money from Ben, clash with Deirdre, who takes a more and more authoritative role in the house.

iii. The Deal Deirdre leaves Ben for Phil, and Gloria returns. Ben is relieved that he did not shoot Gloria, and admits that the house and garden flourish under her influence. Spin is killed by a group of younger children who set up house in the woods behind Ben's house and supplant Spin and Phil in the collection business. Ben helps them establish local legitimacy in exchange for commissions on their earnings and sexual favors from their companion, Doreen.

iv. The Deaths Ben discovers he has prostate cancer. During his long hospital stay, Gloria hires FedEx—for which Phil now works—to get rid of the makeshift houses's residents. Creatures called "Metallobioforms", designed to clear away large tracts of land for human exploitation, raze the house. Ben sees evidence that they also devoured and killed the young people. He is left as powerless to protest Gloria's cruelty as he was left sexually impotent by the prostate surgery.

v. The Dahlia Gloria hires a deer hunter to kills the doe that has been nibbling their garden. Ben cannot share Gloria's triumph or the hunter's communion with nature. He regains some control of his bladder, but this is not enough to erase the impression that he has become a ghost wandering around in his own house.

== Critical reception ==
In a review for the New York Observer titled "John Updike, Champion Literary Phallocrat, Drops One; Is This Finally the End for Magnificent Narcissists?" (later published in Consider the Lobster), novelist David Foster Wallace wrote a scathing critique of Toward the End of Time. Wallace wrote:

It is, of the total 25 Updike books I've read, far and away the worst, a novel so mind-bendingly clunky and self-indulgent that it's hard to believe the author let it be published in this kind of shape.

Wallace quotes literary readers he knows who call Updike "a penis with a thesaurus". Aside from its protagonist, whom Wallace calls unlikable, he says the novel's prose is so "turgid" that it distracts "us with worries about whether Mr. Updike might be injured or ill". Wallace concludes:

Ben Turnbull's unhappiness is obvious right from the book's first page. But it never once occurs to him that the reason he's so unhappy is that he's an asshole.

In contrast, Margaret Atwood wrote a favorable review for the New York Times, "Memento Mori—But First, Carpe Diem". She praised Updike's "brilliant metaphors" and called Turnbull, in his semi-idyllic, upper-class rural home, "a Thoreau run through the meat grinder of the 20th century".

Atwood noted Turnbull's brutality (to both himself and others) but also his rueful, evenhanded powers of observation that fall "alike on everything: on flowers, animals, grandchildren, corpses, copulations; on ancient Egypt and plastic peanuts; on memory, disgust, dread, lust and spiritual rapture."

Atwood concluded, "As memento mori and its obverse, carpe diem, Toward the End of Time could scarcely be bettered."

Critic James Wood was dismissive, as he is of much of Updike's work, calling the book "a deeply misogynistic moan".

In his 2006 New York Times review of Updike's novel Terrorist, novelist Robert Stone called Toward the End of Time a "haunting but unresolved novel" and wrote that Updike's work "has never departed too far from his religious concerns" and that Toward the End of Time is no different, even though it "presents a war- and crime-ravaged terminal America".
