= Brazil (novel) =

1994 novel by John Updike

- First edition
- Author: John Updike
- Language: English
- Publisher: Alfred A. Knopf
- Publication date: 1994
- Publication place: United States
- Media type: Print (hardcover)
- Pages: 272 pp
- ISBN: 0-679-43071-7
- OCLC: 28587188
- Dewey Decimal: 813/.54 20
- LC Class: PS3571.P4 B48 1994

Brazil is a 1994 novel by the American author John Updike. It contains many elements of magical realism. It is a retelling of the ancient tale of Tristan and Isolde, the subject of many works in opera and ballet.

Tristão Raposo, a nineteen-year-old black child of the Rio de Janeiro slums, spies Isabel Leme, an eighteen-year-old upper-class white girl, across the hot sands of Copacabana beach, and presents her with a ring stolen from an American tourist. Their flight into marriage takes them from urban banality to the farthest reaches of Brazil’s wild west, where magic still rules. Privation, violence, captivity and poverty afflict them; his mother curses them, her father strives to separate them, and neither lover is absolutely faithful. Eventually, ancient charms change him to white and her to black. Yet Tristão and Isabel hold on to the belief that each is the other’s fate for life, as they develop in ways they never thought possible.

Critic James Wood described it as 'full of soft writing'.
