= Center for Women's Studies =

Serbian non-profit social organization

The Women's Studies Center (Serbian: Центар за женске студије, romanized: Centar za ženske studije) is an independent non-profit and non-governmental organization in Belgrade, Serbia. Its mission is to create and promote alternative education opportunities through a variety of teaching, research, and publishing programs. The aim of these programs is to explore social practices of discrimination and exclusion based on gender, nationality, sexuality, color, class, religion, etc., to theoretically consider potential models of resistance to oppression and exclusion, and to celebrate differences.

After many negotiations, the University of Belgrade at the Faculty of Political Sciences officially recognized and accredited a set of the Center’s programs, which enabled the establishment of the Center for Gender and Politics, an institution founded to further promote gender studies. The Women’s Studies Center continues to have a long-term goal of further institutionalization by formally establishing and institutionalizing a Women’s Studies program at the University of Belgrade.

== Founding and history ==
Belgrade Women's Studies Center was initiated by a feminist activist group "Women and Society” in 1992. The first experimental one-semester course started symbolically on March 8, 1992. It was conceptualized at the beginning of the 90s as a peacetime endeavor. From its inception and throughout the first decade of its history, the Center worked against the backdrop of the wars fought between 1991–1999 as an alternative to the mainstream education of the time. It was founded an anti-war and anti-nationalist educational enlightenment project, grounded-in and supported by feminist activism. One co-founder was the academic Biljana Dojčinović.
