= Ambassador Book Award =

- Awarded for: Literary and non-fiction works
- Country: United States
- Presented by: English-Speaking Union
- First award: 1986

The Ambassador Book Award (1986–2011) was presented annually by the English-Speaking Union. It recognized important literary and non-fiction works that contributed to the understanding and interpretation of American life and culture. Winners of the award were considered literary ambassadors who provide, in the best contemporary English, an important window on America to the rest of the world. A panel of judges selected books out of new works in the fields of fiction, biography, autobiography, current affairs, American studies and poetry.

The award was established in 1986. Winners included books by such notable authors as Tom Wolfe (1988), Joan Didion (1988), Raymond Carver (1989), Gore Vidal (1989), John Cheever (1992), John Updike (1997), Don Delillo (1998), Philip Roth (1999), and Annie Proulx (2000).

== Recipients ==
1986

- Fiction - Lake Wobegon Days, by Garrison Keillor
- Fiction - The Accidental Tourist, by Anne Tyler

1987

- American Studies - Cities on a Hill: A Journey Through Contemporary American Cultures, by Frances FitzGerald
- American Studies - The Cycles of American History, by Arthur M. Schlesinger, Jr
- Biography & Autobiography - The Life of Langston Hughes, Volume I: 1902-1941: I, Too, Sing America, by Arnold Rampersad
- Fiction - Roger's Version, by John Updike
- Special Citation - The Story of English by Robert McCrum, William Cran and Robert MacNeil

1988

- American Arts & Letters - Collected Prose, by Robert Lowell
- American Studies - Miami, by Joan Didion
- Biography & Autobiography - Many Masks: A Life of Frank Lloyd Wright, by Brendan Gill
- Fiction - The Bonfire of the Vanities, by Tom Wolfe
- Special Citation - Blues by John Hersey

1989

- American Arts & Letters - At Home: Essays 1982-1988, by Gore Vidal
- American Studies - A Bright Shining Lie John Paul Vann and America in Vietnam, by Neil Sheehan
- Biography & Autobiography - Parting the Waters: America in the King Years 1954-1963, by Taylor Branch
- Fiction - Where I'm Calling From: New and Selected Stories, by Raymond Carver

1990

- American Arts & Letters - The Writing Life, by Annie Dillard
- American Studies - Among Schoolchildren, by Tracy Kidder
- Biography & Autobiography - This Boy's Life: A Memoir, by Tobias Wolff
- Fiction - Oldest Living Confederate Widow Tells All, by Allan Gurganus

1991

- American Arts & Letters - The House of Barrymore, by Margot Peters
- American Studies - A New York Life, by Brendan Gill
- Biography & Autobiography - The House of Morgan, by Ron Chernow
- Fiction - Killing Mr. Watson, by Peter Matthiessen

1992

- American Arts & Letters - The Journals of John Cheever, by John Cheever
- American Studies - The Crisis Years: Kennedy and Khrushchev : 1960 - 1963, by Michael Beschloss
- Biography & Autobiography - Woodrow Wilson, by August Heckscher
- Fiction - A Thousand Acres, by Jane Smiley
- Special Prize - American Views: Essays on American Art by John Wilmerding

1993

- American Arts & Letters - Up in the Old Hotel, by Joseph Mitchell
- American Studies - Lincoln at Gettysburg: The Words That Remade America, by Garry Wills
- Biography & Autobiography - Archibald MacLeish: An American Life, by Scott Donaldson
- Fiction - Outerbridge Reach, by Robert Stone

1994

- American Studies - Around the Cragged Hill A Personal and Political Philosophy, by George F. Kennan
- Biography & Autobiography - W. E. B. Du Bois: Biography of a Race 1868-1919, by David Levering Lewis
- Fiction - The Oracle at Stoneleigh Court, by Peter Taylor
- Poetry - Tesserae & Other Poems, by John Hollander

1995

- American Studies - Speak Now Against the Day: The Generation Before the Civil Rights Movement in the South, by John Egerton
- Biography & Autobiography - No Ordinary Time Franklin and Eleanor Roosevelt: The Home Front in World War II, by Doris Kearns Goodwin
- Fiction - The Collected Stories, by Grace Paley
- Poetry - Like Most Revelations, by Richard Howard

1996

- American Studies - Moving Violations: War Zones, Wheelchairs and Declarations of Independence, by John Hockenberry
- Biography & Autobiography - Walt Whitman's America: A Cultural Biography, by David S. Reynolds
- Fiction - All the Days and Nights, by William Maxwell
- Poetry - Atlantis, by Mark Doty
- Special Award - The Liar's Club by Mary Karr

1997

- American Studies - Undaunted Courage: Meriwether Lewis, Thomas Jefferson and the Opening of the American West, by Stephen E. Ambrose
- Biography & Autobiography - Taking on the World: Joseph and Stewart Alsop- Guardians of the American Century, by Robert W. Merry
- Fiction - In the Beauty of the Lilies, by John Updike
- Poetry - The Figured Wheel: New and Collected Poems, 1966 - 1996, by Robert Pinsky

1998

- American Studies - American Visions, by Robert Hughes
- Autobiography - Burning the Days: Recollection, by James Salter
- Biography - American Sphinx: The Character of Thomas Jefferson, by Joseph Ellis
- Fiction - Underworld, by Don DeLillo
- Poetry - Black Zodiac, by Charles Wright

1999

- American Studies - Slaves in the Family, by Edward Ball
- Biography & Autobiography - N.C. Wyeth, by David Michaelis
- Fiction - I Married a Communist, by Philip Roth
- Poetry - The Collected Poems of Robert Penn Warren, by John Burt

2000

- American Studies - Freedom from Fear: The American People in Depression and War, 1929–1945, by David M. Kennedy
- Biography & Autobiography - Morgan: American Financier, by Jean Strouse
- Fiction - Close Range: Wyoming Stories, by Annie Proulx
- Literary Achievement - The Best Short Stories of the Twentieth Century by John Updike
- Poetry - Vita Nova, by Louise Glück

2001

- American Studies - In the Heart of the Sea: The Tragedy of the Whaleship Essex, by Nathaniel Philbrick
- Biography & Autobiography - The Chief: The Life of William Randolph Hearst, by David Nasaw
- Lifetime Achievement - Arthur M. Schlesinger, Jr.
- Fiction - Angel on the Roof: The Stories of Russell Banks, by Russell Banks
- Poetry - American Poetry: The Twentieth Century, 2 vols., by Hass, Hollander, Kizer, Mackey, Perloff

2002

- American Studies - Carry Me Home: Birmingham, Alabama, the Climactic Battle of the Civil Rights Revolution, by Diane McWhorter
- Biography & Autobiography - John Adams, by David McCullough
- Lifetime Achievement - Hortense Calisher
- Fiction - Empire Falls, by Richard Russo
- Poetry - The Darkness and the Light, by Anthony Hecht

2003

- Fiction - Middlesex, by Jeffrey Eugenides
- American Studies - In the Devil's Snare: The Salem Witchcraft Crisis of 1692, by Mary Beth Norton
- Biography & Autobiography - Jesse James: Last Rebel of the Civil War, by T. J. Stiles
- Poetry - Springing, New and Selected Poems, by Marie Ponsot
- Lifetime Achievement - Edmund S. Morgan

2004

- American Studies - They Marched into Sunlight, by David Maraniss
- Biography & Autobiography - Hawthorne, A Life, by Brenda Wineapple
- Fiction - The Time of Our Singing, by Richard Powers
- Poetry - Robert Lowell: Collected Poems, edited by Frank Bidart & David Gewanter
- Distinguished Achievement Award - Robert A. Caro

2005

- American Studies - Washington's Crossing, by David Hackett Fischer
- Biography & Autobiography - De Kooning: An American Master, by Mark Stevens
- Fiction - Gilead, by Marilynne Robinson
- Poetry - Collected Poems, by Donald Justice

2006

- American Studies - A Great Improvisation: Franklin, France, and the Birth of America, by Stacy Schiff
- Biography & Autobiography - American Prometheus: The Triumph and Tragedy of J. Robert Oppenheimer, by Kai Bird and Martin Sherwin
- Fiction - Liberation: A Novel, by Joanna Scott
- Poetry - Migration, by W.S. Merwin

2007

- American Studies - The Worst Hard Time: The Untold Story of Those Who Survived the Great American Dust Bowl, by Timothy Egan
- Autobiography - The Afterlife: A Memoir, by Donald Antrim
- Biography - The Most Famous Man in America: The Biography of Henry Ward Beecher, by Debby Applegate
- Current Affairs - Fiasco: The American Military Adventure in Iraq, by Thomas E. Ricks
- Fiction - The Collected Stories of Amy Hempel, by Amy Hempel
- Poetry - Averno, by Louise Glück
- Lifetime Achievement - Garry Wills

2008

- American Studies - Storming the Gates of Paradise: Landscapes for Politics, by Rebecca Solnit
- Autobiography - Prime Green: Remembering the Sixties, by Robert Stone
- Biography - Edith Wharton, by Hermione Lee
- Fiction - The Reluctant Fundamentalist, by Mohsin Hamid
- Poetry - Blackbird and Wolf, by Henri Cole
- Lifetime Achievement - John Ashbery

2009

- American Studies - A Summer of Hummingbirds, by Christopher Benfey
- Biography and Autobiography - A Passion for Nature: The Life of John Muir, by Donald Worster
- Current Affairs - The Dark Side: The Inside Story of How the War on Terror Turned into a War on American Ideals, by Jane Mayer
- Fiction - Dangerous Laughter: Thirteen Stories, by Steven Millhauser
- Poetry - Old War, by Alan Shapiro
- Special Award - Toni Morrison

2010

- American Studies - The Rebellion of Ronald Reagan: A History of the End of the Cold War, by James Mann
- American Studies - Dancing in the Dark: A Cultural History of the Great Depression, by Morris Dickstein
- Biography and Autobiography - Louis D. Brandeis: A Life, by Melvin Urofsky
- Fiction - Let the Great World Spin, by Colum McCann
- Poetry - Mercury Dressing, by J. D. McClatchy
- Special Distinction Award - Thelonious Monk: The Life and Times of an American Original, by Robin D. G. Kelley

2011

- American Studies - The Immortal Life of Henrietta Lacks, by Rebecca Skloot
- Biography and Autobiography - The Publisher: Henry Luce and His American Century, by Alan Brinkley
- Fiction - The Collected Stories of Deborah Eisenberg, by Deborah Eisenberg
- Poetry - Every Riven Thing: Poems, by Christian Wiman
- Special Distinction Award - The Memory Chalet, by Tony Judt
