= The Centaur =

1963 novel by John Updike

- First edition
- Author: John Updike
- Language: English
- Publisher: Alfred A. Knopf
- Publication date: 1964
- Publication place: United States
- ISBN: 978-0394418810

The Centaur is a novel by John Updike, published by Alfred A. Knopf in 1963. It won the U.S. National Book Award for Fiction. Portions of the novel first appeared in Esquire and The New Yorker.

The French translation of the novel won the Prix du Meilleur Livre Étranger (Best Foreign Book Prize).

== Plot summary ==
The story concerns George Caldwell, a schoolteacher, and his son Peter, who live outside of Alton (i.e., Reading), Pennsylvania. The novel explores the relationship between the depressive Caldwell and his anxious son, loosely based on John Updike's relationship with his father, Wesley Updike, a teacher at Shillington High School. George has largely given up on life; what glory he knew, as a football player and soldier in World War I, has passed. He feels put upon by the school's principal, and he views his students as hapless and uninterested in anything he has to teach them. Peter, meanwhile, is a budding aesthete who idolizes Vermeer and dreams of becoming a painter in a big city, like New York. He has no friends his age, and regularly worries that his peers might detect his psoriasis, which stains his skin and flecks his clothes every season but summer. One thing George and Peter share is the desire to get out, to escape their hometown. This masculine desire for escape appears in Updike's famed "Rabbit" novels. Similarly, the novel's image of Peter's mother alone on an untended farm is one we later see in Updike's 1965 novel Of the Farm.

== Reception ==
Describing The Centaur as “a poor novel irritatingly marred by good features” literary critic Jonathan Miller in The New York Review of Books writes:

In [a] sense it is another A Portrait of the Artist as a Young Man (1916) and Updike’s didactic allegory suffers by contrast with the delicacy with which Joyce uses the myth of Daedalus...the book [is] damaged by the necessity which Updike makes out of his own virtue. His sly adjectival prose creates an extraordinary surface effect…

Miller continues: “I say he has made a necessity out of his own virtue, but perhaps I should say virtuosity, since it is his enslavement to his own bravura skill which finally disqualifies this novel from genuine literary consideration.”

Author Anthony Burgess, noting evidence of “pedantry” in Updike’s mythological parallels, praises The Centaur as “a noble attempt at adding fresh dimensions to a contemporary story by calling on ancient myth.” Burgess writes:

[T]he brilliance of the language seemed no longer to be functioning in a void, unrelated to the subject matter of the book: it was appropriate to the other all complexity of the overall image; it was the true link between the story and the myth.

Burgess closes with this praise for Updike: “He is one of America’s most exciting talents, but much of the excitement is still to come.”

== Themes ==
Like James Joyce in Ulysses, Updike drew on the myths of antiquity in an attempt to turn a modern and common scene into something more profound, a meditation on life and man's relationship to nature and eternity. George is both the Centaur Chiron and Prometheus (some readers might see George's son Peter as Prometheus), Mr. Hummel, the automobile mechanic, is Hephaestus (AKA Vulcan); and so forth.

The novel's structure is unusual; the narrative shifts from present day (late 1940s) to prospective (early 1960s), from describing the characters as George, Vera, and the rest, to the Centaur, Venus, and so forth. It also is punctuated with a feverish dream scene and George's obituary. Near the end of the novel, Updike includes two untranslated Greek sentences. Their translation is as follows:

Having an incurable wound, he delivered himself into the cave. Wanting, and being unable, to have an end, because he was immortal, [then with] Prometheus offering himself to Zeus to become immortal for him, thus he died.

This quote is from Bibliotheca 2.5.4, and describes the death of Chiron.

“Updike’s willingness to assign tremendous significance to his childhood home reaches a crescendo in The Centaur, a powerful attempt to mythologize the artist’s early portrait by returning, as James Joyce did in A Portrait of the Artist as a Young Man (1916) and Ulysses (1922), to ancient Greek stories.”—Author and critic Stacey Olster in The Cambridge Companion to John Updike (2006)

Novelist and literary critic Joyce Carol Oates reports that The Centaur represents a “balance” between “the classical-artistic-‘immoral’” aspects of Updike’s creative interests and his Calvinistic background. Oates writes:

The Centaur, being a relatively early and emotionally biographical work, is valuable in its obvious statement of the dichotomy in the author’s imagination between the “pagan” and the “Christian”....surely the example of Joyce’s Ulysses was always in his mind…”

Oates reports that Updike’s wished to provide his protagonist George Caldwell—and for himself—“another spiritual dimension in which they might be heroic without being heretical.”

== Sources ==
- Burgess, Anthony. 1966. “Language, Myth and Mr. Updike from Commonweal (magazine), 83, February 11, 1966 in Critical Essays on John Updike G. K. Hall & Co., Boston Massachusetts. William R. MacNaughton, editor. pp. 55-58. ISBN 0-8161-8467-4
- Luscher, Robert M. 1993. John Updike: A Study of the Short Fiction. Twayne Publishers, New York. ISBN 0-8057-0850-2
- Miller, Jonathan. 1982. Off-Centaur from The New York Review of Books, November 1, 1963 in Critical Essays on John Updike G. K. Hall & Co., Boston Massachusetts. William R. MacNaughton, editor. pp.53-55. ISBN 0-8161-8467-4
- Oates, Joyce Carol. 1975. “Updike’s American Comedies” from Modern Fiction Studies, Vol. 21, No. 3 (Fall 1973) in John Updike: A Collection of Critical Essays. 1979. David Thorburn and Howard Eiland, editors. pp. 53-68. ISBN 0-13-937607-0
- Olster, Stacey. 2006. The Cambridge Companion to John Updike. Cambridge University Press, Cambridge. ISBN 0-521-60730-2 (paperback)
- Price, Martin. 1963. “A Note on Character in The Centaur” from The Yale Review, 52, No. 4 (June 1963) in John Updike: A Collection of Critical Essays. 1979. David Thorburn and Howard Eiland, editors. pp. 132–133. ISBN 0-13-937607-0
