= Marry Me (novel) =

1976 novel by John Updike

- First edition cover
- Author: John Updike
- Language: English
- Genre: Romantic novel
- Published: 1976 by Alfred A. Knopf
- Publication place: United States
- Media type: Print
- Pages: 303 pp
- ISBN: 978-0-3944-0856-9
- OCLC: 2283832
- Dewey Decimal: 813.54
- LC Class: PS3571.P4

Marry Me: A Romance is a 1976 novel by American writer John Updike.

== Summary ==
As in Updike's 1968 Couples, two married households—in this case, the Conants and the Mathiases—meet and entwine. Jerry Conant's love for Sally Mathias is the primary engine of the novel; his wife Ruth's reaction, and the reaction of Sally's husband Richard, are the story's bookends.

== Reception ==
The novel was well received by critics. In The Atlantic, Richard Todd enthusiastically welcomed the book: "'Marry Me,' for all its playfulness, is Updike's most mature work. His writing has deepened, grown wiser and funnier, like a face that is aging well." In Newsweek, Peter S. Prescott called the novel Updike's most affecting. "This understatement, this unwavering vision fixed on only four characters, is a part of what makes the story so effective. Updike's best fiction has always been his most narrowly focused; in this novel the plot is direct—complex without becoming complicated by symbols thrashing obstrusively just behind the canvas—and refreshingly free from the portentousness that has marred several of his most ambitious novels. 'Marry Me' is the best written and least self-conscious of Updike's longer fiction; it contains his most sophisticated and sympathetic portraits of women. It is quite simply, Updike's best novel yet. I can't believe that anyone married or divorced could read it without being moved."
