= Martha Ruggles Bernhard Updike =

American social worker (1937-2023)

- Born: October 18, 1937; Chicago, Illinois, US
- Died: October 9, 2023 (aged 85)
- Education: Cornell University; Harvard University; Simmons University
- Spouse(s): Alexander Bernhard (m. 1959, divorced) John Updike (m. 1977; died 2009)
- Children: 3

Martha Franc Ruggles Bernhard Updike (October 18, 1937 – October 9, 2023) was an American social worker and the widow of author John Updike. She served as a model for several of his fictional characters, including in his story "A Constellation of Events", which was loosely based on the initiation of their relationship.

== Early life and education ==
Martha Franc Ruggles was born on October 18, 1937, in Chicago, Illinois, to Frederic Stanbro Ruggles and Margaret Meyers Ruggles. She spent a large part of her early childhood in Chicago, and the family lived with her paternal grandfather, Charles Ruggles, a textile manufacturer, during her early years. After leaving Chicago as a child, Ruggles largely grew up in Fairfield, Connecticut. She then attended Cornell University as a member of the class of 1959 where she was a member of Kappa Alpha Theta. At Cornell she studied under Vladimir Nabokov, who considered her a star pupil, and she largely adopted Nabokov's perspective on literature. She received an M.Ed. from Harvard University in 1964 and an M.S.W. from Simmons University in 1988.

== First marriage and family ==
In 1959 in Groton, Connecticut, Martha Ruggles married Alexander Bernhard. Bernhard was a 1957 graduate of MIT and 1964 Harvard Law School graduate and Navy reserve submariner from 1957 to 1961. The Bernhards had three sons together, John, Jason, and Frederic. From 1965 to 1966 they lived in Eugene, Oregon, while Alexander worked for a firm there after clerking for Judge Charles Merton Merrill of the Ninth Circuit Court of Appeals from 1964 to 1965.

== Relationship and marriage to John Updike ==
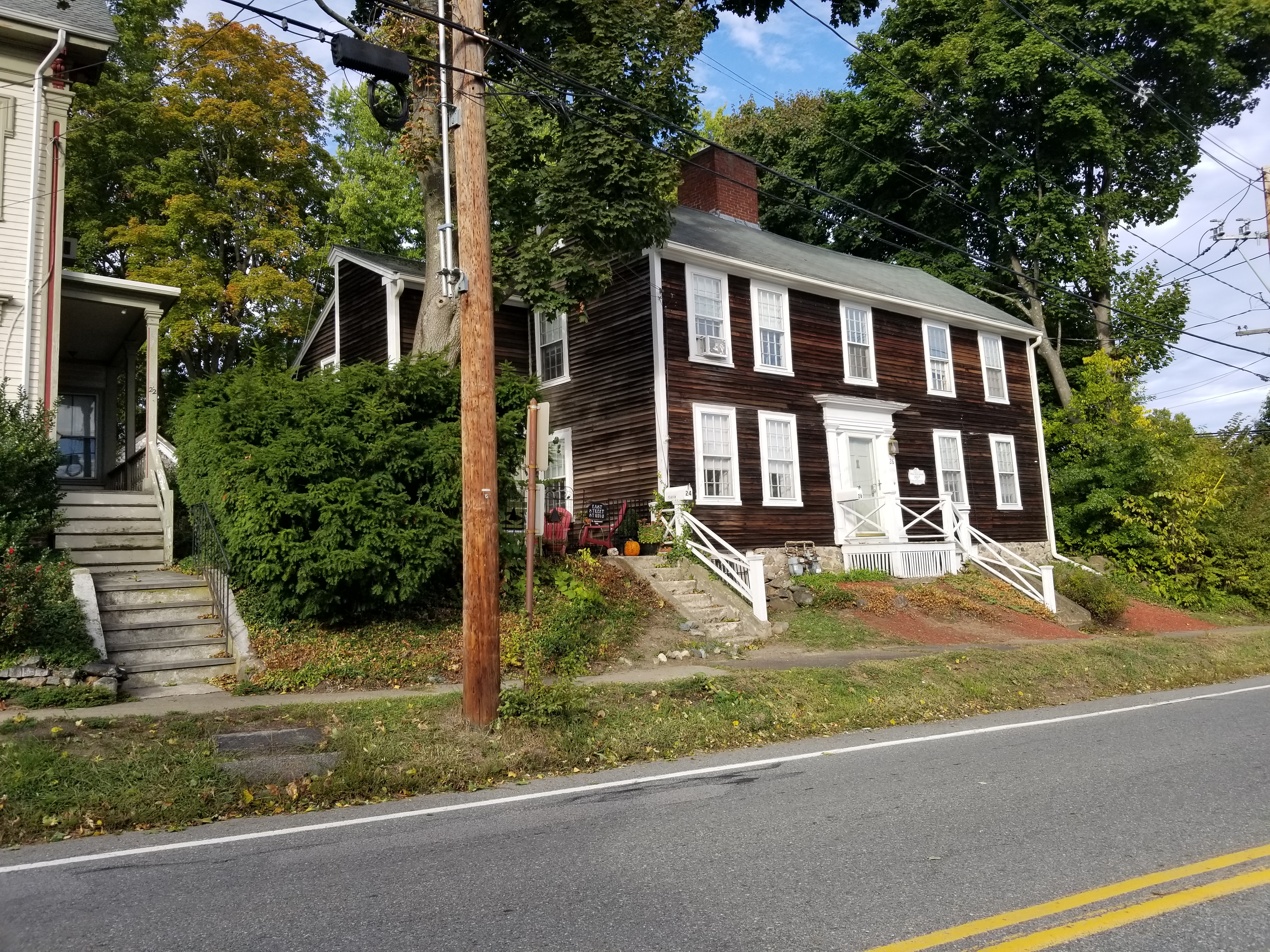
Polly Dole House (ca. 1687) in Ipswich which the Bernhards purchased from the Updikes in 1970

In 1966 the Bernhards moved back to the Boston area and were living in Wellesley, Massachusetts, in 1970 when they purchased John Updike's house (Polly Dole House) in Ipswich, Massachusetts, when the Updikes moved to a larger home in town. By at least 1975 Martha had developed a relationship with John Updike, and they appeared publicly together. The Bernhards divorced, and by 1976 Alexander Bernhard became the sole owner of Updike's former house. Martha married John Updike in 1977 at Clifton Lutheran Church in Marblehead. Just before their wedding, Bernhard married Joyce Harrington, an ex-mistress of John Updike. John and Martha Updike resided in Georgetown, Massachusetts, until 1982, when they moved to Beverly Farms, Massachusetts. Although John Updike often borrowed experiences from his family life in his writing, Martha's ex-husband threatened legal action if Updike wrote about his stepsons in his thinly fictionalized writing, so Updike largely refrained from doing so. But Updike did borrow from Martha's experience with Nabokov in his fiction, and dedicated several pieces to her. Martha Updike attended church with John at St. John's Episcopal Church in Beverly. The Updikes remained married until John's death in 2009.

After his death, Martha Updike moved to a Wenham condo until leaving in 2016 to move into assisted living. During John Updike's life, Martha Updike largely served as self-appointed gatekeeper for his writing, and after his death Martha shared decision-making about his copyrights with his children. She died in New York City on October 9, 2023, at the age of 85. She had been suffering from dementia for several years.
