= Biljana Dojčinović =

Serbian feminist academic

- Биљана Дојчиновић
- Born: 1963 (age 62–63)
- Citizenship: Serbian
- Education: University of Belgrade
- Occupation: Literary theorist
- Employer: University of Belgrade
- Known for: Co-founder of Center for Women's Studies in Belgrade; Author of first book in Serbian on Virginia Woolf
- Awards: Anđelka Milić Award

Biljana Dojčinović-Nešić (Serbian Cyrillic: Биљана Дојчиновић; born 1963) is a Serbian feminist academic, who specialises in Serbian literature and Gender Studies, and who co-founded the Center for Women's Studies in Belgrade. She is Professor of Literature in the Faculty of Philology at the University of Belgrade. She is the first person to publish a book on Virginia Woolf in Serbian.

== Education ==
In 1986, Biljana Dojčinović graduated from the Department of General Literature and Literary Theory of the Faculty of Philology at the University of Belgrade. At the same faculty, in 1991, she defended her master's thesis 'The category of gender in American gynocriticism' (Категорија род у америчкој гинокритици), and then, in 2003, her doctoral dissertation, Narrative processes in John Updike's novels (Приповедни поступци у романима Џона Апдајка).

== Career ==
Dojčinović is Professor of Literature at the Department of General Literature and Literary Theory of the Faculty of Philology at the University of Belgrade. She is one of the founders of the Center for Women's Studies in Belgrade, as well as the Indoc Center of the Association for Women's Initiative. From 2002 to 2008, she was the editor-in-chief of the magazine for feminist theory, Genero.

As a member of The John Updike Society (JUS), as well as a member of the editorial board of The John Updike Review since its inception, Dojčinović has been on the board of directors since 2015. She was a member of the board of the research project, Women Writers in History: Toward a New Understanding of European Literary Culture (2009−2013) from 2011. Since 2011, she has been the manager of the research project Literature - theory and history of women's literature in the Serbian language until 1915. She is the chief editor of Knjizenstva [sr], a magazine for literature, gender and culture studies.

== Research ==
Dojčinović was the first author to publish a book on Virginia Woolf in Serbian. She has also written criticism on other modernist writers, such as Henry James. She has also written on how women's studies in the region has shifted from a focus on women through a Communist lens, to a more theoretical and individual approach. In her work on Updike, she has argued that his short story collection The Afterlife and Other Stories is a pivotal work that demonstrates a change in his writing on feminism. She has written on the role of Milica Stojadinović-Srpkinja in the development of women's writing in Serbia, through a feminist framework.

== Recognition ==
In 2016, she received the Anđelka Milić [sr] Award for the book Pravo sunca - different modernisms (Academic book, Novi Sad, 2015).

== Selected works ==
- Dojcinovic, Biljana, and Nemanja Glintic. "John Updike in Serbia." Contemporary American Fiction in the European Classroom: Teaching and Texts (2022): 63.
- Dojčinović, Biljana. "The Politics of Vulnerability in The Afterlife and Other Stories." Updike and Politics: New Considerations (2019): 161.
- Dojčinović, Biljana. "Modernist Narrative Techniques and Challenges of Humanity: John Updike in European Perspective." From Humanism to Meta-, Post-and Transhumanism? (2016): 269-82.
- Daskalova, Krassimira, et al. "Clio on the margins: women's and gender history in Central, Eastern and Southeastern Europe (Part one)." Aspasia 6.1 (2012): 125-185.
- Dojčinović, Biljana. "Forging, Milking, Delivering: The Female and Maternal as Links Between A Portrait and Ulysses." Belgrade English Language and Literature Studies 3.1 (2011): 163-173.
- Dojčinović-Nešić, Biljana. "Translation as Border-Crossing: Virginia Woolf’s Case." TRANS-. Revue de littérature générale et comparée 9 (2010).
- Dojčinović, Biljana. "De-centered Pluralism of Methods: Feminist Literary Criticism in Serbia." Gender and Identity. Centar za ženske studije & Centar za studije roda i politike, Fakultet političkih nauka, Beograd 281-296.
- Dojčinović, Biljana. "Feministička čitanja i preispitivanje književnog kanona." Genero: časopis za feminističku teoriju i studije kulture 01 (2002): 36-42.
- Dojčinović, Biljana. "On Women and Literature at the Beginning of XX Century." Selected Papers. Belgrade women's studies journal: Anniversary issue 1992/2002. Centar za ženske studije & Centar za studije roda i politike, Fakultet političkih nauka, Beograd 83-88.
- Dojčinović, Biljana. "O ženama i književnosti na početku veka." Ženske studije: časopis za feminističku teoriju 11-12 (2000): 23-33.
