= Telephone Poles =

1963 poetry book by John Updike

First edition

Telephone Poles is the second book of poetry written by American writer John Updike.

== Publication ==
The collection was published by Knopf in 1963.

== Reception ==
In The New York Times, critic X.J. Kennedy wrote, "Of younger writers in America today, surely John Updike is our leading pyrotechnist. Few can make words so obligingly sizzle and flash, so clearly light up the landscape of suburbia. While dazzling his readers in the last five years with five novels and books of stories, Updike simultaneously has been turning out satiric verse and light poetry galore: 66 pieces in this new collection, most of them first contributed to The New Yorker. He is, it seems, like some designer of Explorer rockets who hasn't enough to do, in his spare time touching off displays of Roman candles...It also shows Updike to be on occasion a poet of rare depth and competence. We ought to have expected this — if not from his earlier book of light verse, The Carpentered Hen, then from the grim lyricism of the novel, Rabbit, Run; or from the excellent prose poem 'Archangel' in the story collection, Pigeon Feathers. Admirers of his fiction will see his verse as clearly the work of his hand. The same compassionate scrutiny informs such a poem as "The Short Days," with its evocation of a suburban morning:

Then red rims gild the gutter-spouts;
The streetlamp pales; the milk-truck fades;
And housewives — husbands gone — wash doubts
Down sinks and raise the glowing shades.

In Updike's verse, too, is his wry awareness of the small absurdities we live with daily."
