= Gertrude and Claudius =

2000 novel by John Updike

- Author: John Updike
- Cover artist: Chip Kidd (designer)
- Language: English
- Genre: Novel
- Publisher: Alfred A. Knopf
- Publication date: February 8, 2000
- Publication place: United States
- Media type: Print (hardback & paperback)
- Pages: 212 pp (hardcover edition)
- ISBN: 0-375-40908-4
- OCLC: 41565089
- Dewey Decimal: 813/.54 21
- LC Class: PS3571.P4 G47 2000

Gertrude and Claudius is a novel by John Updike. It uses the known sources of William Shakespeare's Hamlet to tell a story that draws on a rather straightforward revenge tale in medieval Denmark, as depicted by Saxo Grammaticus in his twelfth-century Historiae Danicae. It also incorporates extra plot elements added by François de Belleforest in his Histoires tragiques, published in 1576, and furthermore brings in various elements from Shakespeare's play itself, including the name "Corambis" for Polonius from the "bad quarto" of 1603. This story, in its three forms, is primarily concerned with Hamlet (or "Amleth" in Saxo) avenging his father's murder, but the story starts earlier. The novel is concerned with that earlier life of Gertrude, Claudius, and old Hamlet, and it ends at the close of Act I, scene ii of Hamlet.

The characters have different names in Saxo, Belleforest, and Shakespeare (e.g. Gerutha, Geruthe, Gertrude), and the novel, in three parts, modulates the names as the play's time approaches. The story takes elements from all three predecessors, but is consistent (arguably) only with Shakespeare's. For example, the murder that was public knowledge in Saxo and Belleforest becomes secret in Shakespeare and also in this story. But Belleforest introduces the adultery between Gertrude and Claudius (Shakespeare is ambiguous on this point), and further, implies that Gertrude encouraged Claudius to murder her husband. Updike takes the adultery, and makes it an appealing love affair. Gertrude is a sensual, somewhat neglected wife, Claudius a rather dashing fellow, and old Hamlet an unpleasant combination of brutal Viking raider and coldly ambitious politician. But Updike has Claudius kill his brother without Gertrude's knowledge or encouragement. Finally, Gertrude has definite intimations of a ghost of her dead husband, and Claudius hears rumors of a midnight spirit in armour roving the battlements. The ghost is only Shakespearean.

Hamlet spends most of the novel's time offstage, as it were: a young child shunted off to nursemaids, a boy left to mischief with the disorderly Yorick, or a seemingly perpetual student living in Wittenberg. He never speaks for himself, and is seen very briefly only twice. But as the story ends he is finally back home at Elsinore, and Claudius feels that the resentful young man can be trained up into a properly domesticated prince and, matched with Ophelia (presented as a pretty but rather vacant young woman), reliably produce heirs to extend this benign dynasty...
