= The Coup (novel) =

1978 book by John Updike

- First edition
- Author: John Updike
- Language: English
- Publisher: Knopf
- Publication date: 1978
- Publication place: U.S.
- Pages: 318
- ISBN: 9780141188959

The Coup is a 1978 novel by American author John Updike. It is a black comedy narrated by the former leader of a fictional Islamic country in Sub-Saharan Africa with a vehement hatred of all things American.

== Summary ==
Hakim Felix Ellellou, ex-dictator of Kush, a fictional Islamic state in Sub-Saharan Africa, narrates the history of his life and his rule over his former desert empire from his current exile in France. With his drought ridden country ever on the verge of a humanitarian crisis, Ellellou's troubles begin when the hated Americans begin sending food aid to his starving people. The crazed dictator has the crates of food burned to keep out the Americans but his second-in-command turns against him, secretly negotiating a deal with the United States for rights to the country's oil.
