= Roger's Version =

1986 novel by John Updike

Roger’s Version
- First edition cover
- Author: John Updike
- Language: English
- Genre: Novel
- Publisher: Alfred A. Knopf
- Publication place: United States
- Media type: Print (hardcover)
- Pages: 352
- ISBN: 978-0-394-55435-8

Roger's Version is a 1986 novel by American writer John Updike. The novel received the 1987 Ambassador Book Award for Fiction.

== Plot summary ==
The novel is about Roger Lambert, a theology professor in his fifties, whose rather complacent faith is challenged by Dale, an evangelical Christian graduate student who believes he can prove that God exists with computer science. Roger becomes obsessed with the thought that Dale is having an affair with his wife, Esther.

Roger himself becomes involved with his niece Verna, a coarse but lively nineteen-year-old and single parent whose own mother (Roger's half-sister) had a sexual hold over him when they were in their teens. Verna, frustrated by her poverty and limited opportunities, becomes increasingly abusive towards her one-and-a-half-year-old, mixed-race daughter, Paula. Roger, out of sympathy for her situation and his increasing sexual attraction for her, begins to tutor Verna so she can earn her high school equivalency.

One evening, when Paula refuses to go to sleep, Verna shoves and hits her; Paula falls and breaks her leg. Roger, after helping Verna disguise the assault as a playground accident, has sex with her. Dale, meanwhile, grows depressed and disillusioned when his data does not seem to point to the existence of God. The novel ends with Verna leaving Boston to return to her parents in Cleveland, and Roger and Esther receiving temporary custody of Paula.

== Major themes ==
The novel's structure, characters and themes are based somewhat on Nathaniel Hawthorne's The Scarlet Letter, with Roger Lambert representing Roger Chillingworth, his wife Esther as Hester Prynne, Dale standing for Arthur Dimmesdale, and Paula a version of Hester's illegitimate daughter Pearl.

The review for Publishers Weekly said the novel was focused on longstanding themes of Updike's work: "reason versus faith; science versus religion; belief versus any of the forms of unbelief."

The New York Times review by novelist David Lodge described the novel as having five major thematic areas: theology, eroticism, domesticity, physical description and science. All of these themes are mediated by the narrating character Roger, which Lodge describes as at times "over [the reader's] head, at least on first reading."

== Critical reception ==
Publishers Weekly was not impressed with the novel, writing "for all Updike's finesse and dexterity in the deployment of ideas, there is more arcane computerology here than readers, including his most devoted, can digest by force-feeding, and probably more theology as well. Most readers will also think the characters contrived, mouthpieces for the perspectives they espouse."

Some voices found the novel praiseworthy, with David Lodge writing, "One finishes it with gratitude – for it is challenging and educative – and with renewed respect for one of the most intelligent and resourceful of contemporary novelists."
