= My Father's Tears and Other Stories =

- First edition cover
- Author: John Updike
- Language: English
- Genre: Short story collection
- Publisher: Alfred A. Knopf
- Publication date: 2009
- Publication place: United States
- Media type: Print (hardcover)
- Pages: 304
- ISBN: 9780307271563

My Father's Tears and Other Stories is a collection of 18 works of short fiction by John Updike. The volume was published posthumously in 2009 by Alfred A. Knopf and is the final collection to date of Updike's stories.

== Stories ==
The stories first appeared in The New Yorker, unless indicated otherwise. The collection was published posthumously.

- "Morocco" (The Atlantic, November 1979)
- "Personal Archaeology" (May 29, 2000)
- "Free" (January 8, 2001)
- "The Laughter of the Gods" (February 11, 2002)
- "Varieties of Religious Experience" (The Atlantic, November, 2002)
- "Spanish Prelude to a Second Marriage" (Harper's Magazine, October 2002)
- "Delicate Wives" (February 2, 2004)
- "The Guardians" (March 26, 2001)
- "The Walk With Elizanne" (July 7, 2003)
- "The Accelerating Expansion of the Universe" (Harper's Magazine, October 2004)
- "German Lessons" (Playboy, January 2006)
- "The Road Home" (February 7, 2005 [originally "The Roads of Home"])
- "My Father's Tears" (February 7, 2006)
- "Kinderszenen" (Harper's Magazine, November 2006)
- "The Apparition" (The Atlantic, in its "Summer Fiction Issue" 2007)
- "Blue Light" (Playboy, January 2008)
- "Outage" (January 7, 2008)
- "The Full Glass" (May 26, 2008)

== Reception ==
"For all the novels, the stories, the journalism, essays, poetry, wit and wisdom, his understanding of the US and of life, readers can only thank him. John Updike has taken his final bow with a swan song worthy of his genius." —Literary critic Eileen Battersby from "The Master Takes a Final Bow" in The Irish Times, June 20, 2009.

Literary critic Simon Baker of The Guardian offers this mixed assessment of the collection:

Some of these stories, while skilfully crafted, do not have sufficient plot or purpose to match the art of their construction; one always reads on, but the imbalance can leave you gawping in admiration at the quality of the sentences. but unmoved by the whole. This, though, is only an occasional gripe: when Updike gets it right - when the wonder of his prose, the energy of his narrative, the keenness of his eye and the rehabilitating warmth of his artistic mind are all firing - the reader is left with the sense of having encountered modern American fiction in its near-perfect state.

Calling the collection "a memory book" literary critic Eileen Battersby registers high praise for the Updike's posthumously issued collection of short fiction:

My Fathers Tears and Other Stories appears to remind us of exactly how good Updike was and is. At his finest – and there are numerous echoes of his sensuous flair throughout these stories – he simply wrote better than anyone. His earthiness balanced his elegance, and his elegant delivery countered the often earthy, messily sexual content.

Battersby singles out a passage from the title story "My Father's Tears" as an appreciation:

I saw my father cry only once. It was at the Alton train station, back when the trains still ran . . . I was eager to go, for already my home and my parents had become somewhat unreal to me, and Harvard, with its courses and the hopes for my future they inspired . . . I was going somewhere, and he was seeing me go.

== Sources ==
- Baker, Simon. 2009. "A Wry Eye on the American Condition". The Guardian, July 19, 2009. Retrieved 21 March 2023.
- Battersby, Eileen. 2009. "The Master Takes a Final Bow". The Irish Times, June 20, 2009. Retrieved 21 March 2023.
- Carduff, Christopher. 2013. Note on the Texts from John Updike: Collected Later Stories. Christopher Carduff, editor. The Library of America. pp. 948–958 ISBN 978-1-59853-252-4
