= Seek My Face =

2002 novel by John Updike

- First edition
- Author: John Updike
- Publisher: Knopf

Seek My Face is a 2002 book by John Updike.

== Synopsis ==
The novel follows the life of Hope Chafetz, an elderly artist who is being interviewed by a journalist. During the interview Hope discusses her many marriages, one of which is to a famous painter.

== Reception ==
In a review for New York Times Michiko Kakutani criticized the book's characters, which she felt were unbelievable.
