= In the Beauty of the Lilies =

1996 novel by John Updike

- First edition
- Author: John Updike
- Language: English
- Genre: Christian fiction
- Publisher: Alfred A. Knopf
- Publication date: 1996
- Publication place: United States
- Media type: Print
- Pages: 491
- Awards: Ambassador Book Award
- ISBN: 9780679446408
- OCLC: 906666002

In the Beauty of the Lilies is a 1996 novel by John Updike. It takes its title from a line of the abolitionist song "The Battle Hymn of the Republic." The novel received the 1997 Ambassador Book Award for Fiction.

In The New York Times, critic Michiko Kakutani called the work “dazzling ... a book that forces us to reassess the American Dream.”

== Summary ==
Beginning in 1910 and ending in 1990, the novel covers four generations of the Wilmot family, tying its fortunes to both the decline of the Christian faith and the rise of Hollywood in twentieth century America. In her appraisal of Updike's work New York Times critic Michiko Kakutani wrote: "Mr. Updike’s stunning and much underestimated 1996 epic, ‘In the Beauty of the Lilies,’ tackled an even wider swath of history [than his Rabbit Tetralogy]. In charting the fortunes of an American family through some 80 years, the author showed how dreams, habits and predilections are handed down generation to generation, parent to child, even as he created a kaleidoscopic portrait of this country from its nervous entry into the 20th century to its stumbling approach to the millennium."

=== Part I ===
The first section, set mainly in Paterson, New Jersey, is centered on Clarence Wilmot, a minister in his forties who abruptly loses his faith one very hot afternoon shortly before a dinner party. His loss of faith is presented as coinciding with the fainting spell of the 17-year-old silent film actress Mary Pickford, who is at local landmark Lambert Castle making a film with D. W. Griffith. His decision to leave the ministry has serious social and financial consequences for his wife and three children, 16-year-old Jared, 14-year-old Esther and 10-year-old Ted. Unable to find work suitable for a man of his education, Clarence is reduced to selling encyclopedias door to door, a job he performs poorly. Growing more and more depressed and withdrawn, he finds solace only in the nickelodeon cinemas of the time and dies prematurely.

=== Part II ===
The remainder of Clarence's family moves to the small town of Basingstoke, Delaware to live with Clarence's sister Esther. This next section which covers the 1920s, focuses on Clarence's youngest son Ted. A quiet child, he grows up to be a diffident adult, much like his father. He gradually becomes involved with an equally shy young woman called Emily with a stunted and deformed foot whose family is socially looked down on, possibly because it is rumored her mother is part black. On their first date they see the Greta Garbo feature Flesh and the Devil. (The film stars of the 1920s are frequently mentioned, but unlike his father, Ted takes little pleasure in movies, finding them exhausting and intrusive). His mother and Aunt Esther (Clarence's sister), disappointed with Ted's choice of Emily as a girlfriend and his general lack of ambition, sends him to stay with his older brother Jared in New York City. Jared has married the daughter of a bootlegger and is involved in shady schemes himself. Ted is uncomfortable with the job Jared finds for him as a rent collector in immigrant neighborhoods and feels out of place at the speakeasies Jared and his friends frequent. He decides to return home and marry Emily; his mother and aunt resign themselves to Ted's choice of a bride and find him a job as a postman which he works at contentedly for decades. His marriage to Emily proves emotionally and sexually fulfilling, and by the end of the second section they are the parents of a baby daughter named Esther.

=== Part III ===
In the following section, Esther (nicknamed Essie) becomes the main protagonist. A beautiful and confident, if somewhat arrogant, little girl, she decides at a young age that she wants to be a movie star. She gets her first real break at eighteen when she agrees to a photo shoot with a photographer who noticed her at a beauty contest. He asks to photograph her topless and after hesitating, she agrees. Later she moves to New York City to stay with her wealthy cousin Patrick who has offered to further her career. Assuming that Patrick is expecting sexual favors from her, she tries to seduce him, but Patrick rebuffs her and later tells her he is a homosexual. Esther finds work modeling and gradually begins appearing in films, typically as a spunky girl next door similar to Judy Garland. Renamed Alma DeMott, she gradually becomes a minor celebrity. A number of actual Hollywood personalities from this time are featured, including Gary Cooper and Clark Gable who are two of her first co-stars. She has a brief affair with Gable, and Cooper gives her fatherly advice about acting. Harry Cohn also makes an appearance. At age 29, just when she is fearing her career is starting to decline, Alma becomes pregnant and gives birth to a son she names Clark, in honor of Clark Gable who is recently deceased. She makes a successful comeback in a series of musicals, but her son grows up neglected.

=== Part IV ===
The final section focuses on Clark and jumps ahead to the late 1980s when he is an aimless young man halfheartedly working as a ski lift operator for his great uncle Jared in Colorado. The evening after an altercation with another employee, he meets a young woman called Hannah who invites him home with her. It turns out she lives in a religious commune, similar to that of the Branch Davidians. Clark agrees to stay on, partially out of aimlessness and attraction to Hannah, but also because the group's puritanical stance on modern American pop culture, particularly movies, appeals to him (reversing the stance of his great grandfather who abandoned religion and embraced the newly born film industry). The group consists of several young adults and their children, led by the charismatic but controlling Jesse. Turning more and more away from modern American life, the group grows increasingly paranoid and isolated, refusing to send its children to school and shooting at a school bus driver. This eventually leads to a siege similar to that at Waco. Jesse orders Clark and the other adult male followers to shoot all the women and children; Clark however rebels and shoots Jesse instead. This action ends up saving most of the women and children, although Clark is shot and killed himself soon afterward. A number of Clark's relatives, including Ted (now a widower in his nineties) view the siege on the television news. Despite their shock and grief they are proud that the young man most of them had dismissed years ago as a loser has saved so many lives.

== Reception ==
Writing in The New York Times, Michiko Kakutani called the novel “dazzling”. An attempt “to chart the fortunes of an American family through four generations and some 80 years, and in doing so, create a portrait of the country, from its nervous entry into the 20th century to its stumbling approach to the millennium,” writes Kakutani in her assessment. “‘In the Beauty of the Lilies’ is not only Mr. Updike's most ambitious novel to date, but arguably his finest: a big, generous book, narrated with Godlike omniscience and authority and populated by a wonderfully vivid cast of dreamers, wimps, social climbers, crackpots and lost souls, a book that forces us to reassess the American Dream and the crucial role that faith (and the longing for faith) has played in shaping the national soul.”

Critic James Wood called it a "complacent historical saga". Writer and critic Joseph Bottum wrote in Commentary, "The story is perhaps a little sketchy, as though the book were an abstract for a novel rather than the finished thing, but it is a thoughtful and serious book, in places funny and in places sad, by a thoughtful and serious man, the prose master of his generation".

In The New Yorker, critic George Steiner called the novel “awesome,” concluding, “Updike’s genius, his place beside Hawthorne and Nabokov have never been more assured.”

In 2015, Publishers Weekly ranked the novel among its “Ten Best John Updike Books”.

== Honors ==
The novel received the 1997 Ambassador Book Award for Fiction, presented by the English-Speaking Union.
