= John Updike =

American writer (1932–2009)

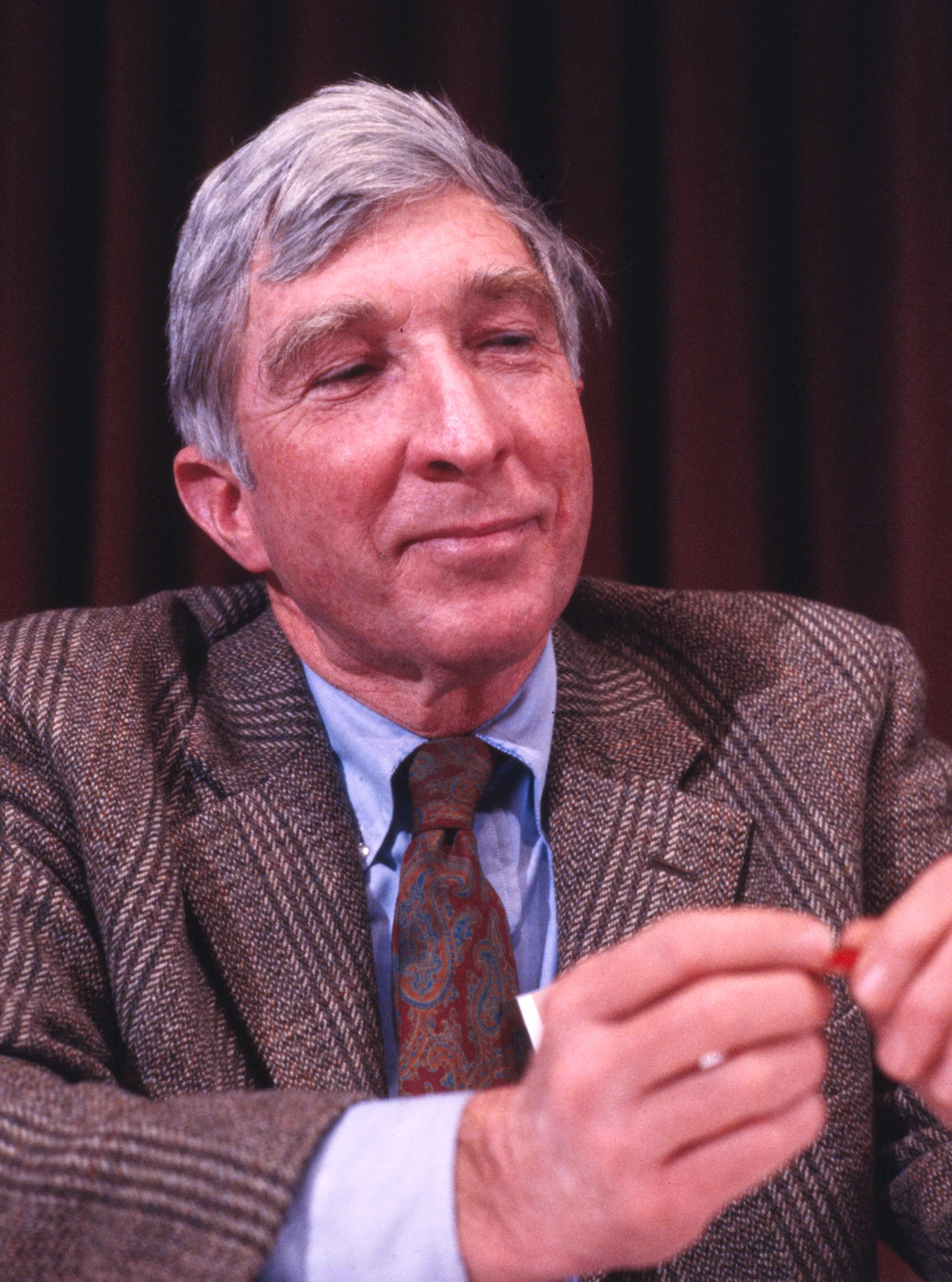
- Updike in 1986
- Born: John Hoyer Updike; March 18, 1932; Reading, Pennsylvania, U.S.
- Died: January 27, 2009 (aged 76); Danvers, Massachusetts, U.S.
- Education: Harvard University (BA); Ruskin School of Art, Oxford
- Occupations: Novelist; short-story writer; poet; literary critic; artist
- Spouses: Mary Entwistle Pennington (m. 1953; div. 1974); Martha Ruggles Bernhard (m. 1977)
- Writing career
- Genre: Literary realism
- Notable works: Rabbit Angstrom novels: Rabbit, Run (1960); Rabbit Redux (1971); Rabbit Is Rich (1981); Rabbit at Rest (1990); Henry Bech stories The Witches of Eastwick
- John Updike's voice from the BBC program Front Row, October 31, 2008.

John Hoyer Updike (March 18, 1932 – January 27, 2009) was an American novelist, poet, short-story writer, art critic, and literary critic. One of only four writers to win the Pulitzer Prize for Fiction more than once (the others being Booth Tarkington, William Faulkner, and Colson Whitehead), Updike published more than 20 novels, more than a dozen short-story collections, as well as poetry, art and literary criticism, and children's books during his career.

Hundreds of his stories, reviews, and poems appeared in The New Yorker starting in 1954. He also wrote regularly for The New York Review of Books. His most famous work is his "Rabbit" series (the novels Rabbit, Run; Rabbit Redux; Rabbit Is Rich; Rabbit at Rest; and the novella Rabbit Remembered), which chronicles the life of the middle-class everyman Harry "Rabbit" Angstrom over the course of several decades, from young adulthood to death. Both Rabbit Is Rich (1981) and Rabbit at Rest (1990) were awarded the Pulitzer Prize.

Describing his subject as "the American small town, Protestant middle class", critics recognized his careful craftsmanship, his unique prose style, and his prolific output – a book a year on average. Updike populated his fiction with characters who "frequently experience personal turmoil and must respond to crises relating to religion, family obligations, and marital infidelity".

His fiction is distinguished by its attention to the concerns, passions, and suffering of average Americans, its emphasis on Christian theology, and its preoccupation with sexuality and sensual detail. His work has attracted significant critical attention and praise, and he is widely considered one of the great American writers of his time. Updike's highly distinctive prose style features a rich, unusual, sometimes arcane vocabulary as conveyed through the eyes of "a wry, intelligent authorial voice that describes the physical world extravagantly while remaining squarely in the realist tradition". He described his style as an attempt "to give the mundane its beautiful due".

== Early life and education ==
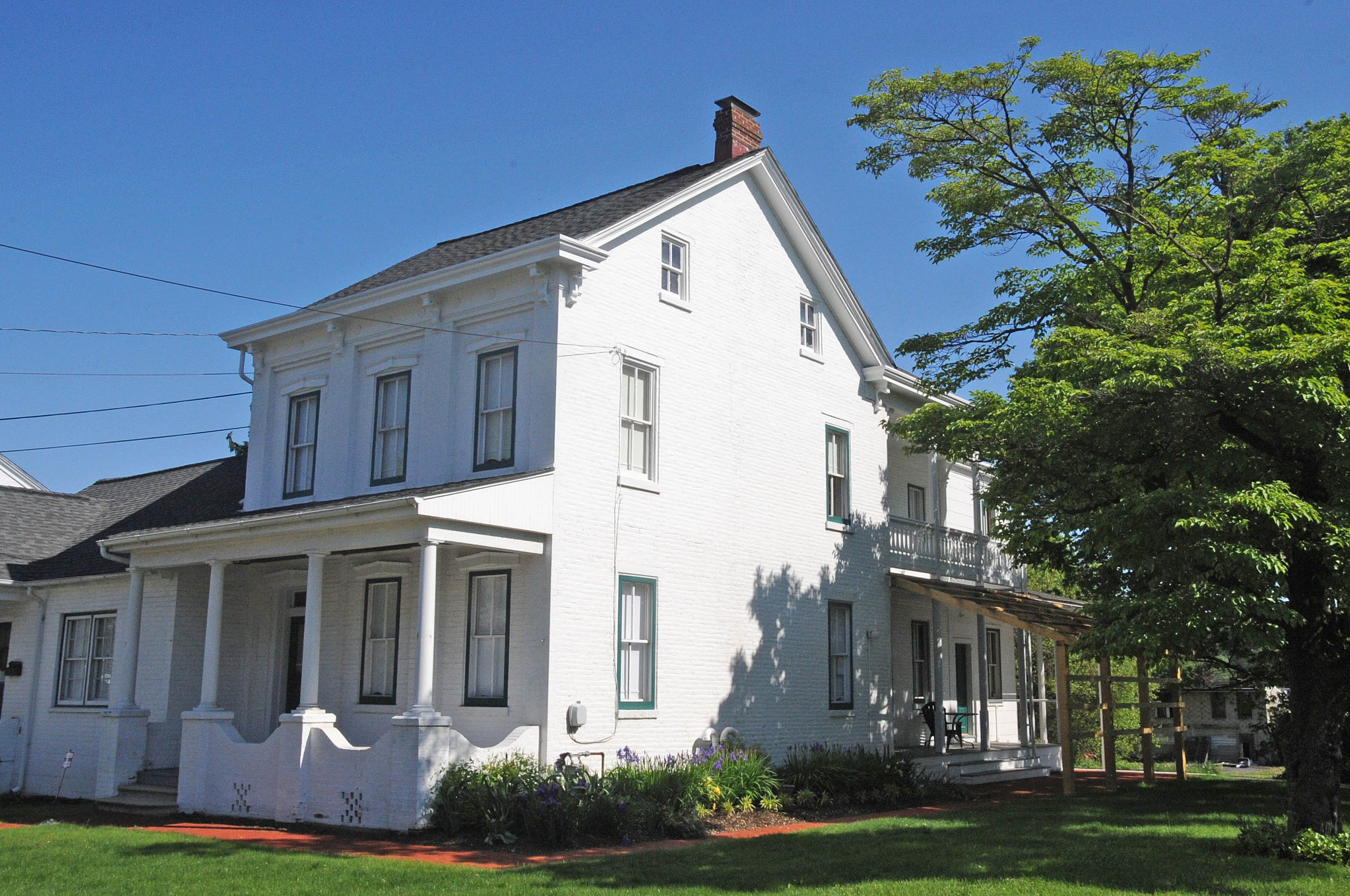
Updike's boyhood home in Shillington, Pennsylvania

Updike was born in Reading, Pennsylvania, the only child of Linda Grace (née Hoyer) and Wesley Russell Updike, and was raised at his childhood home in the nearby small town of Shillington. The family later moved to the unincorporated village of Plowville. His mother's attempts to become a published writer impressed the young Updike. "One of my earliest memories", he later recalled, "is of seeing her at her desk ... I admired the writer's equipment, the typewriter eraser, the boxes of clean paper. And I remember the brown envelopes that stories would go off in—and come back in."

These early years in Berks County, Pennsylvania, would influence the environment of the Rabbit Angstrom tetralogy, as well as many of his early novels and short stories. Updike graduated from Shillington High School as co-valedictorian and class president in 1950 and received a full scholarship to Harvard University, where he was the roommate of Christopher Lasch during their first year. Updike had already received recognition for his writing as a teenager by winning a Scholastic Art & Writing Award, and at Harvard he soon became well known among his classmates as a talented and prolific contributor to The Harvard Lampoon, of which he was president. He studied with dramatist Robert Chapman, the director of Harvard's Loeb Drama Center. He graduated summa cum laude in 1954 with a degree in English and was elected to Phi Beta Kappa.

Upon graduation, Updike attended the Ruskin School of Art at the University of Oxford with the ambition of becoming a cartoonist. After returning to the United States, Updike and his family moved to New York, where he became a regular contributor to The New Yorker. This was the beginning of his professional writing career.

== Career as a writer ==
=== 1950s ===
Updike stayed at The New Yorker as a full staff writer for only two years, writing "Talk of the Town" columns and submitting poetry and short stories to the magazine. In New York, Updike wrote the poems and stories that came to fill his early books like The Carpentered Hen (1958) and The Same Door (1959). These works were influenced by Updike's early engagement with The New Yorker. This early work also featured the influence of J. D. Salinger ("A&P"); John Cheever ("Snowing in Greenwich Village"); and the Modernists Marcel Proust, Henry Green, James Joyce, and Vladimir Nabokov.

During this time, Updike underwent a profound spiritual crisis. Suffering from a loss of religious faith, he began reading Søren Kierkegaard and the theologian Karl Barth. Both deeply influenced his own religious beliefs, which in turn figured prominently in his fiction. He believed in Christianity for the remainder of his life. Updike said, "As to critics, it seems to be my fate to disappoint my theological friends by not being Christian enough, while I'm too Christian for Harold Bloom's blessing. So be it."

=== 1960s–1970s ===
Later, Updike and his family relocated to Ipswich, Massachusetts. Many commentators, including a columnist in the local Ipswich Chronicle, asserted that the fictional town of Tarbox in Couples was based on Ipswich. Updike denied the suggestion in a letter to the paper. Impressions of Updike's day-to-day life in Ipswich during the 1960s and 1970s are included in a letter to the same paper published soon after Updike's death and written by a friend and contemporary. In Ipswich, Updike wrote Rabbit, Run (1960), on a Guggenheim Fellowship, and The Centaur (1963), two of his most acclaimed and famous works; the latter won the National Book Award.

Rabbit, Run featured Harry "Rabbit" Angstrom, a former high school basketball star and middle-class paragon who would become Updike's most enduring and critically acclaimed character. Updike wrote three additional novels about him. Rabbit, Run was featured in Time's All-TIME 100 Greatest Novels.

=== Short stories ===
Updike's career and reputation were nurtured and expanded by his long association with The New Yorker, which published him frequently throughout his career, despite the fact that he had departed the magazine's employment after only two years. Updike's memoir indicates that he stayed in his "corner of New England to give its domestic news" with a focus on the American home from the point of view of a male writer. Updike's contract with the magazine gave it right of first offer for his short-story manuscripts, but William Shawn, The New Yorker's editor from 1952 to 1987, rejected several as too explicit.

The Maple short stories, collected in Too Far To Go (1979), reflected the ebb and flow of Updike's first marriage; "Separating" (1974) and "Here Come the Maples" (1976) related to his divorce. These stories also reflect the role of alcohol in 1970s America. They were the basis for the television movie also called Too Far To Go, broadcast by NBC in 1979.

Updike's short stories were collected in several volumes published by Alfred A. Knopf over five decades. In 2013, the Library of America issued a two-volume boxed edition of 186 stories under the title The Collected Stories.

=== Novels ===
In 1971, Updike published a sequel to Rabbit, Run called Rabbit Redux, his response to the 1960s; Rabbit reflected much of Updike's resentment and hostility towards the social and political changes that beset the United States during that time.

Updike's early Olinger period was set in the Pennsylvania of his youth; it ended around 1965 with the lyrical Of the Farm.

After his early novels, Updike became most famous for his chronicling infidelity, adultery, and marital unrest, especially in suburban America; and for his controversial depiction of the confusion and freedom inherent in this breakdown of social mores. He once wrote that it was "a subject which, if I have not exhausted, has exhausted me". The most prominent of Updike's novels in this vein is Couples (1968), about adultery in a fictional Massachusetts town. It garnered Updike an appearance on the cover of Time magazine with the headline "The Adulterous Society". Time's article and the novel contributed to national concern about whether U.S. society was abandoning its standards of conduct in sexual matters.

The Coup (1978), a lauded novel about an African dictatorship inspired by a visit he made to Africa, found Updike working in new territory.

=== 1980s–2000s ===
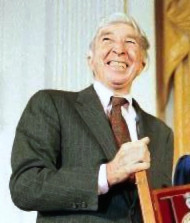
Updike in 1989

In 1980, he published another novel featuring Harry Angstrom, Rabbit Is Rich, which won the National Book Award, the National Book Critics Circle Award, and the Pulitzer Prize for Fiction—all three major American literary prizes. The novel found "Rabbit the fat and happy owner of a Toyota dealership". Updike found it difficult to end the book, because he was "having so much fun" in the imaginary county Rabbit and his family inhabited.

After writing Rabbit Is Rich, Updike published The Witches of Eastwick (1984), a playful novel about witches living in Rhode Island. He described it as an attempt to "make things right with my, what shall we call them, feminist detractors". One of Updike's most popular novels, it was adapted as a film and included on Harold Bloom's list of canonical 20th-century literature (in The Western Canon). In 2008 Updike published The Widows of Eastwick, a return to the witches in their old age. It was his last published novel.

In 1986, he published the unconventional Roger's Version, the second volume of the so-called Scarlet Letter trilogy, about an attempt to prove God's existence using a computer program. Author and critic Martin Amis called it a "near-masterpiece". The novel S. (1989), uncharacteristically featuring a female protagonist, concluded Updike's reworking of Nathaniel Hawthorne's The Scarlet Letter.

Updike enjoyed working in series; in addition to the Rabbit novels and the Maples stories, a recurrent Updike alter ego is the Jewish novelist and eventual Nobel laureate Henry Bech, chronicled in three comic short-story cycles: Bech, a Book (1970), Bech Is Back (1981) and Bech at Bay: A Quasi-Novel (1998). These stories were compiled as The Complete Henry Bech (2001) by Everyman's Library. Bech is seen as a comical and self-conscious antithesis of Updike's own literary persona: Jewish, a World War II veteran, reclusive, and unprolific to a fault.

In 1990, he published the last Rabbit novel, Rabbit at Rest, which won the Pulitzer Prize for Fiction and the National Book Critics Circle Award. Over 500 pages long, the novel is among Updike's most celebrated. In 2000, Updike included the novella Rabbit Remembered in his collection Licks of Love, drawing the Rabbit saga to a close. His Pulitzers for the last two Rabbit novels make Updike one of only four writers to have won two Pulitzer Prizes for Fiction, the others being William Faulkner, Booth Tarkington, and Colson Whitehead.

In 1995, Everyman's Library collected and canonized the four novels as the omnibus Rabbit Angstrom; Updike wrote an introduction in which he described Rabbit as "a ticket to the America all around me. What I saw through Rabbit's eyes was more worth telling than what I saw through my own, though the difference was often slight." Updike later called Rabbit "a brother to me, and a good friend. He opened me up as a writer."

After the publication of Rabbit at Rest, Updike spent the rest of the 1990s and early 2000s publishing novels in a wide range of genres; the work of this period was frequently experimental in nature. These styles included the historical fiction of Memories of the Ford Administration (1992), the magical realism of Brazil (1994), the science fiction of Toward the End of Time (1997), the postmodernism of Gertrude and Claudius (2000), and the experimental fiction of Seek My Face (2002).

In the midst of these, he wrote what was for him a more conventional novel, In the Beauty of the Lilies (1996), a historical saga spanning several generations and exploring themes of religion and cinema in America. It is considered the most successful novel of Updike's late career. Some critics have predicted that posterity may consider the novel a "late masterpiece overlooked or praised by rote in its day, only to be rediscovered by another generation", while others, though appreciating the English mastery in the book, thought it overly dense with minute detail and swamped by its scenic depictions and spiritual malaise. In Villages (2004), Updike returned to the familiar territory of infidelities in New England. His 22nd novel, Terrorist (2006), the story of a fervent young extremist Muslim in New Jersey, garnered media attention but little critical praise.

In 2003, Updike published The Early Stories, a large collection of his short fiction spanning the mid-1950s to the mid-1970s. More than 800 pages long, with over one hundred stories, it has been called "a richly episodic and lyrical Bildungsroman ... in which Updike traces the trajectory from adolescence, college, married life, fatherhood, separation and divorce". It won the PEN/Faulkner Award for Fiction in 2004. This lengthy volume nevertheless excluded several stories found in his short-story collections of the same period.

Updike worked in a wide array of genres, including fiction, poetry (most of it compiled in Collected Poems: 1953–1993, 1993), essays (collected in nine separate volumes), a play (Buchanan Dying, 1974), and a memoir (Self-Consciousness, 1989).

At the end of his life, Updike was working on a novel about St. Paul and early Christianity.

== Personal life ==
Biographer Adam Begley wrote that Updike "transmuted the minutiae of his life" in prose, which enriched his readers at the cost of being "willing to sacrifice the happiness of people around him for his art".

In 1953, while a student at Harvard, Updike married Mary Entwistle Pennington, an art student at Radcliffe College and daughter of a prominent Unitarian minister. She accompanied him to Oxford, England, where she attended art school and their first child, Elizabeth, was born in 1955. The couple had three more children together: David (born 1957), Michael (born 1959), and Miranda (born 1960).

Updike was serially unfaithful, and eventually left the marriage in 1974 for Martha Ruggles Bernhard. In 1977, Updike and Bernhard married. In 1982, his first wife married an MIT academic. Updike and Bernhard lived for more than 30 years in Beverly Farms, Massachusetts. Updike had three stepsons through Bernhard.

Updike was a lifelong Democrat. He endorsed Barack Obama in 2008.

=== Death ===
Updike died of lung cancer at a hospice in Danvers, Massachusetts, on January 27, 2009, at age 76. He was survived by his wife, his four children, three stepsons, his first wife, and seven grandchildren and seven step-grandchildren.

== Poetry ==
Updike published eight volumes of poetry over his career, including his first book The Carpentered Hen (1958), and one of his last, the posthumous Endpoint (2009). The New Yorker published excerpts of Endpoint in its March 16, 2009 issue. Much of Updike's poetical output was recollected in Knopf's Collected Poems (1993). He wrote that "I began as a writer of light verse, and have tried to carry over into my serious or lyric verse something of the strictness and liveliness of the lesser form." The poet Thomas M. Disch noted that because Updike was such a well-known novelist, his poetry "could be mistaken as a hobby or a foible"; Disch saw Updike's light verse instead as a poetry of "epigrammatical lucidity". His poetry has been praised for its engagement with "a variety of forms and topics", its "wit and precision", and for its depiction of topics familiar to American readers.

British poet Gavin Ewart praised Updike for the metaphysical quality of his poetry and for his ability "to make the ordinary seem strange", and called him one of the few modern novelists capable of writing good poetry. Reading Endpoint aloud, the critic Charles McGrath claimed that he found "another, deeper music" in Updike's poetry, finding that Updike's wordplay "smooths and elides itself" and has many subtle "sound effects". John Keenan, who praised the collection Endpoint as "beautiful and poignant", noted that his poetry's engagement with "the everyday world in a technically accomplished manner seems to count against him".

== Literary criticism and art criticism ==
Updike was also a critic of literature and art, one frequently cited as one of the best American critics of his generation. In the introduction to Picked-Up Pieces, his 1975 collection of prose, he listed his personal rules for literary criticism:

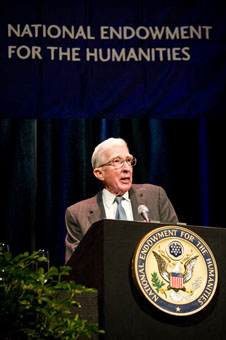
Updike delivering the 2008 Jefferson Lecture

1. Try to understand what the author wished to do, and do not blame him for not achieving what he did not attempt.
2. Give enough direct quotation—at least one extended passage—of the book's prose so the review's reader can form his own impression, can get his own taste.
3. Confirm your description of the book with quotation from the book, if only phrase-long, rather than proceeding by fuzzy précis.
4. Go easy on plot summary, and do not give away the ending.
5. If the book is judged deficient, cite a successful example along the same lines, from the author's œuvre or elsewhere. Try to understand the failure. Sure it's his and not yours?

To these concrete five might be added a vaguer sixth, having to do with maintaining a chemical purity in the reaction between product and appraiser. Do not accept for review a book you are predisposed to dislike, or committed by friendship to like. Do not imagine yourself a caretaker of any tradition, an enforcer of any party standards, a warrior in any ideological battle, a corrections officer of any kind. Never, never ... try to put the author "in his place," making of him a pawn in a contest with other reviewers. Review the book, not the reputation. Submit to whatever spell, weak or strong, is being cast. Better to praise and share than blame and ban. The communion between reviewer and his public is based upon the presumption of certain possible joys of reading, and all our discriminations should curve toward that end.

He reviewed "nearly every major writer of the 20th century and some 19th-century authors", typically in The New Yorker, always trying to make his reviews "animated". He also championed young writers, comparing them to his own literary heroes including Vladimir Nabokov and Marcel Proust. Good reviews from Updike were often seen as a significant achievement in terms of literary reputation and even sales; some of his positive reviews helped jump-start the careers of such younger writers as Erica Jong, Thomas Mallon and Jonathan Safran Foer.

Bad reviews by Updike sometimes caused controversy. In 2008, he gave a "damning" review of Toni Morrison's novel A Mercy, and in 1999 he criticized Alan Hollinghurst's novels for being "relentlessly gay in their personnel". In response to criticism of the latter remark, he said: "I’d be happy not to discuss [homosexuality]. Hollinghurst made it kind of tough."

Updike was praised for his literary criticism's conventional simplicity and profundity, for being an aestheticist critic who saw literature on its own terms, and for his longtime commitment to the practice of literary criticism.

Much of Updike's art criticism appeared in The New York Review of Books, where he often wrote about American art. His art criticism involved an aestheticism like that of his literary criticism.

Updike's 2008 Jefferson Lecture, "The Clarity of Things: What's American About American Art?", dealt with the uniqueness of American art from the 18th century to the 20th. In the lecture he argued that American art, until the expressionist movement of the 20th century in which America declared its artistic "independence", is characterized by an insecurity not found in the artistic tradition of Europe.

In Updike's own words:

Two centuries after Jonathan Edwards sought a link with the divine in the beautiful clarity of things, William Carlos Williams wrote in introducing his long poem Paterson that "for the poet there are no ideas but in things." No ideas but in things. The American artist, first born into a continent without museums and art schools, took Nature as his only instructor, and things as his principal study. A bias toward the empirical, toward the evidential object in the numinous fullness of its being, leads to a certain lininess, as the artist intently maps the visible in a New World that feels surrounded by chaos and emptiness.

== Critical reputation and style ==
He is certainly one of the great American novelists of the 20th century.

— Martin Amis

Updike is considered one of the greatest American fiction writers of his generation. He was widely praised as America's "last true man of letters", with an immense and far-reaching influence on many writers. The excellence of his prose style is acknowledged even by critics skeptical of other aspects of Updike's work.

Several scholars have called attention to the importance of place, and especially of southeast Pennsylvania, in Updike's life and work. Bob Batchelor has described "Updike's Pennsylvania sensibility" as one with profound reaches that transcend time and place, such that in his writing, he used "Pennsylvania as a character" that went beyond geographic or political boundaries. SA Zylstra has compared Updike's Pennsylvania to Faulkner's Mississippi: "As with the Mississippi of Faulkner's novels, the world of Updike's novels is fictional (as are such towns as Olinger and Brewer), while at the same time it is recognizable as a particular American region." Sanford Pinsker observes that "Updike always felt a bit out of place" in places like "Ipswich, Massachusetts, where he lived for most of his life. In his heart—and, more important, in his imagination—Updike remained a staunchly Pennsylvania boy." Similarly, Sylvie Mathé maintains that "Updike's most memorable legacy appears to be his homage to Pennsylvania."

Critics emphasize his "inimitable prose style" and "rich description and language", often favorably compared to Proust and Nabokov. Some critics consider the fluency of his prose to be a fault, questioning the intellectual depth and thematic seriousness of his work given the polish of his language and the perceived lightness of his themes, while others criticized Updike for misogynistic depictions of women and sexual relationships.

Other critics argue that Updike's "dense vocabulary and syntax functions as a distancing technique to mediate the intellectual and emotional involvement of the reader". On the whole, however, Updike is extremely well regarded as a writer who mastered many genres, wrote with intellectual vigor and a powerful prose style, with "shrewd insight into the sorrows, frustrations, and banality of American life".

Updike's character Harry "Rabbit" Angstrom, the protagonist of the series of novels widely considered his magnum opus, has been said to have "entered the pantheon of signal American literary figures", along with Huckleberry Finn, Jay Gatsby, Holden Caulfield and others. A 2002 list by Book magazine of the 100 Best Fictional Characters Since 1900 listed Rabbit in the top five. The Rabbit novels, the Henry Bech stories, and the Maples stories have been canonized by Everyman's Library.

After Updike's death, Harvard's Houghton Library acquired his papers, manuscripts, and letters, naming the collection the John Updike Archive. 2009 also saw the founding of the John Updike Society, a group of scholars dedicated to "awakening and sustaining reader interest in the literature and life of John Updike, promoting literature written by Updike, and fostering and encouraging critical responses to Updike's literary works". The Society will begin publishing The John Updike Review, a journal of critical scholarship in the field of Updike studies. The John Updike Society First Biennial Conference took place in 2010 at Alvernia University.

Eulogizing Updike in January 2009, the British novelist Ian McEwan wrote that Updike's "literary schemes and pretty conceits touched at points on the Shakespearean", and that Updike's death marked "the end of the golden age of the American novel in the 20th century's second half".

McEwan said the Rabbit series is Updike's "masterpiece and will surely be his monument", and concluded:

Updike is a master of effortless motion—between third and first person, from the metaphorical density of literary prose to the demotic, from specific detail to wide generalisation, from the actual to the numinous, from the scary to the comic. For his own particular purposes, Updike devised for himself a style of narration, an intense, present tense, free indirect style, that can leap up, whenever it wants, to a God's-eye view of Harry, or the view of his put-upon wife, Janice, or victimised son, Nelson. This carefully crafted artifice permits here assumptions about evolutionary theory, which are more Updike than Harry, and comically sweeping notions of Jewry, which are more Harry than Updike. This is at the heart of the tetralogy's achievement. Updike once said of the Rabbit books that they were an exercise in point of view. This was typically self-deprecating, but contains an important grain of truth. Harry's education extends no further than high school, and his view is further limited by a range of prejudices and a stubborn, combative spirit, yet he is the vehicle for a half-million-word meditation on postwar American anxiety, failure and prosperity. A mode had to be devised to make this possible, and that involved pushing beyond the bounds of realism. In a novel like this, Updike insisted, you have to be generous and allow your characters eloquence, "and not chop them down to what you think is the right size."

Jonathan Raban, highlighting many of the virtues that have been ascribed to Updike's prose, called Rabbit at Rest "one of the very few modern novels in English ... that one can set beside the work of Dickens, Thackeray, George Eliot, Joyce, and not feel the draft ... It is a book that works by a steady accumulation of a mass of brilliant details, of shades and nuances, of the byplay between one sentence and the next, and no short review can properly honor its intricacy and richness."

The novelist Philip Roth, considered one of Updike's chief literary rivals, wrote, "John Updike is our time's greatest man of letters, as brilliant a literary critic and essayist as he was a novelist and short story writer. He is and always will be no less a national treasure than his 19th-century precursor, Nathaniel Hawthorne."

The noted critic James Wood called Updike "a prose writer of great beauty, but that prose confronts one with the question of whether beauty is enough, and whether beauty always conveys all that a novelist must convey". In a review of Licks of Love (2001), Wood concluded that Updike's "prose trusses things in very pretty ribbons" but that there often exists in his work a "hard, coarse, primitive, misogynistic worldview". Wood both praised and criticized Updike's language for having "an essayistic saunter; the language lifts itself up on pretty hydraulics, and hovers slightly above its subjects, generally a little too accomplished and a little too abstract". According to Wood, Updike is capable of writing "the perfect sentence" and his style is characterized by a "delicate deferral" of the sentence. Of the beauty of Updike's language and his faith in the power of language that floats above reality, Wood wrote:

For some time now Updike's language has seemed to encode an almost theological optimism about its capacity to refer. Updike is notably unmodern in his impermeability to silence and the interruptions of the abyss. For all his fabled Protestantism, both American Puritan and Lutheran-Barthian, with its cold glitter, its insistence on the aching gap between God and His creatures, Updike seems less like Hawthorne than Balzac, in his unstopping and limitless energy, and his cheerfully professional belief that stories can be continued; the very form of the Rabbit books—here extended a further instance—suggests continuance. Updike does not appear to believe that words ever fail us—'life's gallant, battered ongoingness ', indeed—and part of the difficulty he has run into, late in his career, is that he shows no willingness, verbally, to acknowledge silence, failure, interruption, loss of faith, despair and so on. Supremely, better than almost any other contemporary writer, he can always describe these feelings and states; but they are not inscribed in the language itself. Updike's language, for all that it gestures towards the usual range of human disappointment and collapse, testifies instead to its own uncanny success: to a belief that the world can always be brought out of its cloudiness and made clear in a fair season.

In direct contrast to Wood's evaluation, the Oxford critic Thomas Karshan asserted that Updike is "intensely intellectual", with a style that constitutes his "manner of thought" not merely "a set of dainty curlicues". Karshan calls Updike an inheritor of the "traditional role of the epic writer". According to Karshan, "Updike's writing picks up one voice, joins its cadence, and moves on to another, like Rabbit himself, driving south through radio zones on his flight away from his wife and child."

Disagreeing with Wood's critique of Updike's alleged over-stylization, Karshan evaluates Updike's language as convincingly naturalistic:

Updike's sentences at their frequent best are not a complacent expression of faith. Rather, like Proust's sentences in Updike's description, they "seek an essence so fine the search itself is an act of faith." Updike aspires to "this sense of self-qualification, the kind of timid reverence towards what exists that Cézanne shows when he grapples for the shape and shade of a fruit through a mist of delicate stabs." Their hesitancy and self-qualification arise as they meet obstacles, readjust and pass on. If life is bountiful in New England, it is also evasive and easily missed. In the stories Updike tells, marriages and homes are made only to be broken. His descriptiveness embodies a promiscuous love for everything in the world. But love is precarious, Updike is always saying, since it thrives on obstructions and makes them if it cannot find them.

Harold Bloom once called Updike "a minor novelist with a major style. A quite beautiful and very considerable stylist ... He specializes in the easier pleasures." Bloom also edited an important collection of critical essays on Updike in 1987, in which he concluded that Updike possessed a major style and was capable of writing beautiful sentences which are "beyond praise"; nevertheless, Bloom went on, "the American sublime will never touch his pages".

On The Dick Cavett Show in 1981, the novelist and short-story writer John Cheever was asked why he did not write book reviews and what he would say if given the chance to review Rabbit Is Rich. He replied:

The reason I didn't review the book is that it perhaps would have taken me three weeks. My appreciation of it is that diverse and that complicated ... John is perhaps the only contemporary writer who I know now who gives me the sense of the fact that life is—the life that we perform is in an environment that enjoys a grandeur that escapes us. Rabbit is very much possessed of a paradise lost, of a paradise known fleetingly perhaps through erotic love and a paradise that he pursues through his children. It's the vastness of John's scope that I would have described if I could through a review.

The Fiction Circus, an online and multimedia literary magazine, called Updike one of the "four Great American Novelists" of his time along with Philip Roth, Cormac McCarthy, and Don DeLillo, each jokingly represented as a sign of the Zodiac. Furthermore, Updike was seen as the "best prose writer in the world", like Nabokov before him. But in contrast to many literati and establishment obituaries, the Circus asserted that nobody "thought of Updike as a vital writer".

Adam Gopnik of The New Yorker evaluated Updike as "the first American writer since Henry James to get himself fully expressed, the man who broke the curse of incompleteness that had haunted American writing ... He sang like Henry James, but he saw like Sinclair Lewis. The two sides of American fiction—the precise, realist, encyclopedic appetite to get it all in, and the exquisite urge to make writing out of sensation rendered exactly—were both alive in him."

The critic James Wolcott, in a review of Updike's last novel, The Widows of Eastwick (2008), noted that Updike's penchant for observing America's decline is coupled with an affirmation of America's ultimate merits: "Updike elegises entropy American-style with a resigned, paternal, disappointed affection that distinguishes his fiction from that of grimmer declinists: Don DeLillo, Gore Vidal, Philip Roth. America may have lost its looks and stature, but it was a beauty once, and worth every golden dab of sperm."

Gore Vidal, in a controversial essay in The Times Literary Supplement, professed to have "never taken Updike seriously as a writer". He criticizes his political and aesthetic worldview for its "blandness and acceptance of authority in any form". He concludes that Updike "describes to no purpose". In reference to Updike's wide establishment acclaim, Vidal mockingly called him "our good child" and excoriated his alleged political conservatism. Vidal ultimately concluded, "Updike's work is more and more representative of that polarizing within a state where Authority grows ever more brutal and malign while its hired hands in the media grow ever more excited as the holy war of the few against the many heats up."

Robert B. Silvers, editor of The New York Review of Books, called Updike "one of the most elegant and coolly observant writers of his generation". The short-story writer Lorrie Moore, who once called Updike "American literature's greatest short story writer ... and arguably our greatest writer", reviewed Updike's body of short stories in The New York Review, praising their intricate detail and rich imagery: "his eye and his prose never falter, even when the world fails to send its more socially complicated revelations directly his story's way". In her work on Updike, Biljana Dojčinović has argued that his short story collection The Afterlife and Other Stories is a pivotal work that demonstrates a change in his writing on feminism.

Updike's array of awards includes two Pulitzer Prizes for Fiction, two National Book Awards, three National Book Critics Circle awards, the 1989 National Medal of Arts, the 2003 National Humanities Medal, and the Rea Award for the Short Story for outstanding achievement. The National Endowment for the Humanities selected Updike to present the 2008 Jefferson Lecture, the U.S. government's highest humanities honor; Updike's lecture was titled "The Clarity of Things: What Is American about American Art". In November 2008, the editors of the UK's Literary Review magazine awarded Updike their Bad Sex in Fiction Lifetime Achievement Award, which celebrates "crude, tasteless or ridiculous sexual passages in modern literature".

== Themes ==
All in all this is the happiest fucking country the world has ever seen.

— Rabbit Angstrom.

The principal themes in Updike's work are religion, sex, America, and death. He often combined them, especially in his favored terrain of "the American small town, Protestant middle class", of which he once said, "I like middles. It is in middles that extremes clash, where ambiguity restlessly rules."

For example, the decline of religion in America is chronicled in In the Beauty of the Lilies (1996) alongside the history of cinema, and Rabbit Angstrom contemplates the merits of sex with the wife of his friend Reverend Jack Eccles while the latter is giving his sermon in Rabbit, Run (1960).

Critics have often noted that Updike imbued language itself with a kind of faith in its efficacy, and that his tendency to construct narratives spanning many years and books—the Rabbit series, the Henry Bech series, Eastwick, the Maples stories—demonstrates a similar faith in the transcendent power of fiction and language. Updike's novels often act as dialectical theological debates between the book itself and the reader, the novel endowed with theological beliefs meant to challenge the reader as the plot runs its course. Rabbit Angstrom himself acts as a Kierkegaardian Knight of Faith.

Describing his purpose in writing prose in the introduction to his Early Stories: 1953–1975 (2004), Updike wrote that his aim was always "to give the mundane its beautiful due". Elsewhere he famously said, "When I write, I aim my mind not towards New York City but towards a vague spot east of Kansas." Some have suggested that the "best statement of Updike's aesthetic comes in his early memoir 'The Dogwood Tree'" (1962): "Blankness is not emptiness; we may skate upon an intense radiance we do not see because we see nothing else. And in fact there is a color, a quiet but tireless goodness that things at rest, like a brick wall or a small stone, seem to affirm."

=== Sex ===
Sex in Updike's work is noted for its ubiquity and the reverence with which he described it:

His contemporaries invade the ground with wild Dionysian yelps, mocking both the taboos that would make it forbidden and the lust that drives men to it. Updike can be honest about it, and his descriptions of the sight, taste and texture of women's bodies can be perfect little madrigals.

The critic Edward Champion notes that Updike's prose heavily favors "external sexual imagery" rife with "explicit anatomical detail" rather than descriptions of "internal emotion" in descriptions of sex. In Champion's interview with Updike on The Bat Segundo Show, Updike replied that he perhaps favored such imagery to concretize and make sex "real" in his prose. Another sexual theme commonly addressed in Updike is adultery, especially in a suburban, middle class setting, most famously in Couples (1968). The Updikean narrator is often "a man guilty of infidelity and abandonment of his family".

=== United States ===
Similarly, Updike wrote about the United States with a certain nostalgia, reverence, and recognition and celebration of America's broad diversity. ZZ Packer wrote that in Updike, "there seemed a strange ability to harken both America the Beautiful as well as America the Plain Jane, and the lovely Protestant backbone in his fiction and essays, when he decided to show it off, was as progressive and enlightened as it was unapologetic."

The Rabbit novels in particular can be viewed, according to Julian Barnes, as "a distraction from, and a glittering confirmation of, the vast bustling ordinariness of American life". But as Updike celebrated ordinary America, he also alluded to its decline: at times, he was "so clearly disturbed by the downward spin of America". Adam Gopnik concludes that "Updike's great subject was the American attempt to fill the gap left by faith with the materials produced by mass culture. He documented how the death of a credible religious belief has been offset by sex and adultery and movies and sports and Toyotas and family love and family obligation. For Updike, this effort was blessed, and very nearly successful."

Updike's novels about America almost always contain references to political events of the time. In this sense, they are artifacts of their historical eras, showing how national leaders shape and define their times. The lives of ordinary citizens take place against this wider background.

=== Death ===
Updike often wrote about death, his characters providing a "mosaic of reactions" to mortality, ranging from terror to attempts at insulation. In The Poorhouse Fair (1959), the elderly John Hook intones, "There is no goodness without belief ... And if you have not believed, at the end of your life you shall know you have buried your talent in the ground of this world and have nothing saved, to take into the next", demonstrating a religious, metaphysical faith that many characters in Updike's work share.

For Rabbit Angstrom, with his constant musings on mortality, his near-witnessing of his daughter's death, and his often shaky faith, death is more frightening and less obvious in its ramifications. In The Centaur (1963), George Caldwell has no religious faith and is afraid of his cancer. Death can also be a sort of unseen terror; it "occurs offstage but reverberates for survivors as an absent presence".

Updike himself also experienced a "crisis over the afterlife", and:

many of his heroes shared the same sort of existential fears the author acknowledged he had suffered as a young man: Henry Bech's concern that he was "a fleck of dust condemned to know it is a fleck of dust," or Colonel Ellelloû's lament that "we will be forgotten, all of us forgotten." Their fear of death threatens to make everything they do feel meaningless, and it also sends them running after God—looking for some reassurance that there is something beyond the familiar, everyday world with "its signals and buildings and cars and bricks."

Updike demonstrated his own fear in some of his more personal writings, including the poem "Perfection Wasted" (1990):

And another regrettable thing about death
is the ceasing of your own brand of magic ...

== In popular culture ==
- Updike appeared on the cover of Time twice, on April 26, 1968, and on October 18, 1982.
- Updike is the subject of Nicholson Baker's U and I (1991), which Baker called a "closed book examination" of Updike's work. Baker discusses his wish to meet Updike and become his golf partner.
- In 2000, Updike appeared as himself in The Simpsons episode "Insane Clown Poppy" at the Festival of Books.
- The protagonist of the 2002 film 8 Mile, portrayed by Eminem, is nicknamed "Rabbit" and has some similarities to Rabbit Angstrom. The film's soundtrack has a song titled "Rabbit Run".
- Portraits of Updike by the American caricaturist David Levine appeared several times in The New York Review of Books.
- In 2022 and 2023, Bryce Pinkham played Updike in episodes of the TV show Julia.

== Published works ==
=== Rabbit novels ===
- Rabbit, Run (1960)
- Rabbit Redux (1971)
- Rabbit Is Rich (1981)
- Rabbit at Rest (1990)
- Rabbit Angstrom: The Four Novels (1995)
- Rabbit Remembered (a novella in the collection Licks of Love) (2001)

=== Bech books ===
- Bech, a Book (1970)
- Bech Is Back (1982)
- Bech at Bay (1998)
- The Complete Henry Bech (2001)

=== Buchanan books ===
- Buchanan Dying (a play) (1974)
- Memories of the Ford Administration (a novel) (1992)

=== Eastwick books ===
- The Witches of Eastwick (1984)
- The Widows of Eastwick (2008)

=== The Scarlet Letter trilogy ===
- A Month of Sundays (1975)
- Roger's Version (1986)
- S. (1988)

=== Other novels ===
- The Poorhouse Fair (1959)
- The Centaur (1963)
- Of the Farm (1965)
- Couples (1968)
- Marry Me (1977)
- The Coup (1978)
- Brazil (1994)
- In the Beauty of the Lilies (1996)
- Toward the End of Time (1997)
- Gertrude and Claudius (2000)
- Seek My Face (2002)
- Villages (2004)
- Terrorist (2006)

=== Books edited by Updike ===
- The Best American Short Stories (1984)
- The Binghamton Poems (2009)

=== Short story collections ===
- The Same Door (1959)
- Pigeon Feathers (1962)
- Olinger Stories (a selection) (1964)
- Music School: Short Stories (1966)
- Museums and Women and Other Stories (1972)
- Problems and Other Stories (1979)
- Too Far to Go (the Maples stories) (1979)
- Your Lover Just Called (1980)
- Trust Me (1987)
- The Afterlife and Other Stories (1994)
- The Best American Short Stories of the Century (editor) (2000)
- Licks of Love: Short Stories and a Sequel (2001)
- The Early Stories: 1953–1975 (2003)
- Three Trips (2003)
- My Father's Tears and Other Stories (2009)
- The Maples Stories (2009)
- The Collected Stories, Volume 1: Collected Early Stories (2013)
- The Collected Stories, Volume 2: Collected Later Stories (2013)

=== Poetry collections ===
- The Carpentered Hen (1958)
- Telephone Poles (1963)
- A Child's Calendar - Poems (1965)
- Midpoint (1969)
- Dance of the Solids (1969)
- Tossing and Turning (1977)
- Facing Nature (1985)
- Collected Poems 1953–1993 (1993)
- Americana and Other Poems (2001)
- Endpoint and Other Poems (2009)

=== Non-fiction, essays and criticism ===
- Assorted Prose (1965)
- Picked-Up Pieces (1975)
- Hugging The Shore (1983)
- Self-Consciousness: Memoirs (1989)
- Just Looking: Essays on Art (1989)
- Odd Jobs (1991)
- Golf Dreams: Writings on Golf (1996)
- More Matter (1999)
- Still Looking: Essays on American Art (2005)
- In Love with a Wanton: Essays on Golf (2005)
- Due Considerations: Essays and Criticism (2007)
- Hub Fans Bid Kid Adieu: John Updike on Ted Williams (Library of America) (2010)
- Higher Gossip (2011)
- Always Looking: Essays on Art (2012)
- Selected Letters (2025)

See also #External links for links to archives of his essays and reviews in The New Yorker and The New York Review of Books.

== Awards ==
- 1959 Guggenheim Fellow
- 1959 National Institute of Arts and Letters Rosenthal Award
- 1964 National Book Award for Fiction
- 1965 Prix du Meilleur Livre Étranger
- 1966 O. Henry Prize
- 1970 Honorary Doctor of Literature from Emerson College
- 1981 National Book Critics Circle Award for Fiction
- 1981 Edward MacDowell Medal
- 1982 Pulitzer Prize for Fiction
- 1982 National Book Award for Fiction (hardcover) (Note: This was the award for hardcover Fiction. From 1980 to 1983 in National Book Award history there were dual awards for hardcover and paperback books in many categories. Most of the paperback award-winners were reprints, including the 1982 Fiction.)
- 1982 Union League Club Abraham Lincoln Award
- 1983 National Book Critics Circle Award for Criticism
- 1984 National Arts Club Medal of Honor
- 1987 St. Louis Literary Award from the Saint Louis University Library Associates
- 1987 Ambassador Book Award
- 1987 Peggy V. Helmerich Distinguished Author Award
- 1988 PEN/Malamud Award
- 1989 National Medal of Arts
- 1990 National Book Critics Circle Award for Fiction
- 1991 Pulitzer Prize for Fiction
- 1991 O. Henry Prize
- 1992 Honorary Doctor of Letters from Harvard University
- 1995 William Dean Howells Medal
- 1995 Commandeur de l'Ordre des Arts et des Lettres
- 1997 Ambassador Book Award
- 1998 Harvard Arts Medal
- 1998 Medal for Distinguished Contribution to American Letters from the National Book Foundation
- 2002 Fitzgerald Award for Achievement in American Literature
- 2003 National Humanities Medal
- 2004 PEN/Faulkner Award for Fiction
- 2004 Golden Plate Award of the American Academy of Achievement
- 2005 Man Booker International Prize nominee
- 2006 Rea Award for the Short Story
- 2007 American Academy of Arts and Letters Gold Medal for Fiction
- 2008 Jefferson Lecture

== Further reading and literary criticism ==
- Bailey, Peter J., Rabbit (Un)Redeemed: The Drama of Belief in John Updike's Fiction, Farleigh Dickinson University Press, Madison, New Jersey, 2006.
- Baker, Nicholson, U & I: A True Story, Random House, New York, 1991.
- Batchelor, Bob, John Updike: A Critical Biography, Praeger, California, 2013. ISBN 978-0-31338403-5.
- Begley, Adam, Updike, Harper-Collins Publishers, New York, NY, 2014.
- Ben Hassat, Hedda, Prophets Without Vision: Subjectivity and the Sacred in Contemporary American Writing, Bucknell University Press, Lewisburg, Pennsylvania, 2000.
- Bloom, Harold, ed., Modern Critical Views of John Updike, Chelsea House, New York, 1987.
- Boswell, Marshall, John Updike's Rabbit Tetralogy: Mastered Irony in Motion, University of Missouri Press, Columbia, Missouri, 2001.
- Broer, Lawrence, Rabbit Tales: Poetry and Politics in John Updike's Rabbit Novels, University of Alabama Press, Tuscaloosa, Alabama, 2000.
- Burchard, Rachel C., John Updike: Yea Sayings, Southern Illinois University Press, Carbondale, Illinois, 1971.
- Campbell, Jeff H., Updike's Novels: Thorns Spell A Word, Midwestern State University Press, Wichita Falls, Texas, 1988.
- Clarke Taylor, C., John Updike: A Bibliography, Kent State University, Kent, Ohio, 1968.
- De Bellis, Jack, John Updike: A Bibliography, 1968–1993, Greenwood Publishing Group, Westport, Connecticut, 1994.
- De Bellis, Jack, John Updike: The Critical Responses to the Rabbit Saga, Greenwood Publishing Group, Westport, Connecticut, 2005.
- De Bellis, Jack, ed., The John Updike Encyclopedia, Greenwood Press, Santa Barbara, California, 2001.
- Detwiler, Robert, John Updike, Twayne, Boston, 1984.
- Findlay, Bill, Interview with John Updike in Hearn, Sheila G. (ed.), Cencrastus No. 15, New Year 1984, pp. 30 – 36, ISSN 0264-0856
- Greiner, Donald, " Don DeLillo, John Updike, and the Sustaining Power of Myth", UnderWords: Perspectives on Don DeLillo's Underworld, University of Delaware Press, Newark, Delaware, 2002.
- Greiner, Donald, John Updike's Novels, Ohio University Press, Athens, Ohio, 1984.
- Greiner, Donald, The Other John Updike: Poems, Short Stories, Prose, Play, Ohio University Press, Athens, Ohio, 1981.
- Gullette, Margaret Morganroth, "John Updike: Rabbit Angstrom Grows Up", Safe at Last in the Middle Years : The Invention of the Midlife Progress Novel, Backinprint.com, New York, 2001.
- Hamilton, Alice and Kenneth, The Elements of John Updike, William B. Eerdmans Publishing Co., Grand Rapids, Michigan, 1970.
- Hunt, George W., John Updike and the Three Great Secret Things: Sex, Religion, and Art, William B. Eerdmans Pub. Co., Grand Rapids, Michigan, 1985.
- Karshan, Thomas, " Batsy", London Review of Books, March 31, 2005.
- Luscher, Robert M., John Updike: A Study of the Short Fiction, Twayne, New York, 1993.
- Mazzeno, Laurence W. and Sue Norton, eds.,European Perspectives on John Updike, Camden House, 2018.
- McNaughton, William R., ed., Critical Essays on John Updike, GK Hall, Boston, 1982.
- Markle, Joyce B., Fighters and Lovers: Themes in the Novels of John Updike, New York University Press, 1973.
- Mathé, Sylvie, John Updike : La nostalgie de l'Amérique, Berlin, 2002.
- Miller, D. Quentin, John Updike and the Cold War: Drawing the Iron Curtain, University of Missouri Press, Columbia, Missouri, 2001.
- Morley, Catherine, "The Bard of Everyday Domesticity: John Updike's Song for America", The Quest for Epic in Contemporary American Literature, Routledge, New York, 2008.
- Newman, Judie, John Updike, Macmillan, London, 1988.
- O'Connell, Mary, Updike and the Patriarchal Dilemma: Masculinity in the Rabbit Novels, Southern Illinois University Press, Carbondale, Illinois, 1996.
- Olster, Stanley, The Cambridge Companion to John Updike, Cambridge University Press, Cambridge, 2006.
- Plath, James, ed., Conversations with John Updike, University Press of Mississippi Press, Jackson, Mississippi, 1994.
- Porter, M. Gilbert, " John Updike's 'A&P': The Establishment and an Emersonian Cashier", English Journal 61 (8), pp. 1155–1158, November 1972.
- Pritchard, William, Updike: America's Man of Letters, University of Massachusetts Press, Amherst, Massachusetts, 2005.
- Ristoff, Dilvo I., John Updike's Rabbit at Rest: Appropriating History, Peter Lang, New York, 1998.'
- Roiphe, Anne, For Rabbit, with Love and Squalor, Free Press, Washington, D.C., 2000.
- Searles, George J., The Fiction of Philip Roth and John Updike, Southern Illinois University Press, Carbondale, Illinois, 1984.
- Schiff, James A., Updike's Version: Rewriting The Scarlet Letter, University of Missouri Press, Columbia, Missouri, 1992.
- Schiff, James A., United States Author Series: John Updike Revisited, Twayne Publishers, Woodbridge, Connecticut, 1998.
- Tallent, Elizabeth, Married Men and Magic Tricks: John Updike's Erotic Heroes, Creative Arts Book Company, Berkeley, California, 1982.
- Tanner, Tony, "A Compromised Environment", City of Words: American Fiction, 1950–1970, Jonathan Cape, London, 1971.
- Thorburn, David and Eiland, Howard, eds., John Updike: A Collection of Critical Essays, Prentice Hall, Englewood Cliffs, New Jersey, 1979.
- Trachtenberg, Stanley, ed., New Essays on Rabbit, Run, Cambridge University Press, Cambridge, 1993.
- Uphaus, Suzanne H., John Updike, Ungar, New York, 1980.
- Vidal, Gore, "Rabbit's own burrow", Times Literary Supplement, April 26, 1996.
- Wallace, David Foster, "John Updike, Champion Literary Phallocrat, Drops One", New York Observer, October 12, 1997.
- Wood, James, "Gossip in Gilt", London Review of Books, April 19, 2001.
- Wood, James, "John Updike's Complacent God", The Broken Estate: Essays on Literature and Belief, Modern Library, New York, 2000.
- Yerkes, James, John Updike and Religion: The Sense of the Sacred and the Motions of Grace, William B. Eerdmans Publishing Co, Grand Rapids, Missouri, 1999.
