= The Poorhouse Fair =

1959 novel by John Updike

- First edition
- Author: John Updike
- Language: English
- Publisher: Alfred A. Knopf
- Publication date: 1959
- Publication place: United States

The Poorhouse Fair (1959) is the first novel by the American author John Updike. A second edition (New York : Knopf, 1977) included an introduction by the author and was slightly revised.

== Plot ==
The residents of the Diamond County Home for the Aged prepare for their annual fair, a summer celebration at which they sell their crafts and produce to the people of the nearby town. The fair is at first rained out, and the young prefect, Conner, turns the "inmates" against him by arguing with the noble Hook (94 years old, a former teacher with strong religious beliefs). After the rain clears, some residents fling small stones at Conner. The novel examines the political and religious dialectics that exist among its characters and their respective generations.

== Critical reception ==
The novel has been overshadowed by Updike's more popular works, and reviews have been mixed. As examples, Donald Barr of The New York Times deemed it "a work of intellectual imagination and great charity," while Commentary called it a "hearty but not very successful try at a first novel."

Author and dramatist Richard Gilman acknowledges the “deficiencies in some central qualities” of the novel advanced by critics and offers this caveat:

The Poorhouse Fair was a novel of great imaginative accuracy, a delicate ranging of the immediately felt against abstraction, ideology and mechanical ordering of existence…inconclusiveness was precisely what it depended on for the truth of its vision. Humility of this kind is so rare in fiction that some critics...were baffled and disgruntled by Updike’s refusal to do more than keep a fertile space open.

Literary critic Whitney Balliet provides this appraisal of The Poorhouse Fair:

John Updike, the poet and short-story writer, has done a startling thing in his first novel…producing, with almost academic precision, a classic, if not flawless, example of one…

Balliet adds:

The Poorhouse Fair couldn’t be farther from the thinly veiled, self-purgative catalog of an author’s adolescence that constitutes the usual first novel. Indeed, it seeks to enter into the minds of people ranging from their seventies well into their nineties, and, within the book’s purposes succeeds - no mean feat for a novelist born in 1932.

== Theme ==
“The Poorhouse Fair squarely addresses the selfsame that have continued to interest Updike throughout his career: the past as source of strength, the importance of religious faith, the primacy of the individual, and the essential emptiness that seems to be descending on the American spirit.” —Literary critic George J. Searles in The Poorhouse Fair: Updike’s Thesis Statement (1982)

Literary critic Joyce Markle identifies the thematic center of the novel:

In The Poorhouse Fair, an old people’s home becomes a sociological cosmos in which the principal fact is death. But though the poorhouse is, by definition, a place to die, it is important to notice that physical death is not the cause of dread for the inmates…this death consciousness is a mark of their intelligence and independence.

== Sources ==
- Balliet, Whitney. 1959. Writer’s Writer. The New Yorker, February 7, 1959.
- Donner, Dean. 1962. “Rabbit Angstrom’s Unseen World” from New World Writing 20. J. B. Lippincott & Co., 1962 in John Updike: A Collection of Critical Essays. 1979. David Thorburn and Howard Eiland, editors. Pp. 17-34. ISBN 0-13-937607-0
- Gilman, Richard. 1960. “A Distinguished image of Precarious Life” from Commonweal (magazine), October 28, 1960 in John Updike: A Collection of Critical Essays. 1979. David Thorburn and Howard Eiland, editors. Pp. 13-16. ISBN 0-13-937607-0
- Markle, Joyce. 1973. “The Poorhouse Fair: A Fragile Vision of Specialness” from Fighters and Lovers: Theme in the Novels of John Updike, 1973 New York University Press, in John Updike: A Collection of Critical Essays. 1979. David Thorburn and Howard Eiland, editors. pp. 109-116. ISBN 0-13-937607-0
- Olster, Stacey. 2006. The Cambridge Companion to John Updike. Cambridge University Press, Cambridge. ISBN 0-521-60730-2 (paperback)
- Searles, George J. 1982. “The Poorhouse Fair: Updike’s Thesis Statement in John Updike: A Collection of Critical Essays. 1979. David Thorburn and Howard Eiland, editors. pp. 231–236. ISBN 0-13-937607-0
