= The Afterlife and Other Stories =

Book by John Updike

- First edition cover
- Author: John Updike
- Language: English
- Genre: Short story collection
- Publisher: Alfred A. Knopf
- Publication date: 1994
- Publication place: United States
- Media type: Print (hardcover)
- Pages: 336
- ISBN: 9780679435839

The Afterlife and Other Stories is a collection of 22 works of short fiction and a novella by John Updike. The volume was published in 1994 by Alfred A. Knopf.

The short story "The Sandstone Farmhouse" included in the collection won First Prize at the O. Henry Award competition in 1991.

Twelve of the stories appearing in The Afterlife were listed under "Uncollected Stories" by Robert M. Luscher in 1993.

== Stories ==
The stories first appeared in The New Yorker, unless indicated otherwise.

- "The Afterlife" (September 15, 1986)
- "Wildlife" (Esquire, August 1987)
- "Conjunction" (July 27, 1987)
- "Brother Grasshopper" (December 14, 1987)
- "The Journey to the Dead" (May 23, 1988)
- "The Man Who Became a Soprano" (December 26, 1988)
- "Short Easter" (March 27, 1989)
- "A Sandstone Farmhouse" (June 11, 1990)
- "The Other Side of the Street" (October 28, 1991)
- "Aperto, Chiuso" (Playboy, January 1991 [appears under the heading "George and Vivian" in the collection])
- "Tristan and Iseult" (December 3, 1990)
- "Farrell's Caddy" (February 25, 1991)
- "The Rumor" (Esquire, June 1991)
- "Falling Asleep Up North" (May 6, 1991)
- "The Brown Chest" (The Atlantic, May 1992)
- "His Mother Inside Him" (April 20, 1992)
- "Bluebeard in Ireland" (Playboy, January 1993 [appears under the heading "George and Vivian" in the collection])
- "Baby's First Step" (July 27, 1992)
- "Playing With Dynamite" (October 5, 1992)
- "The Black Room" (September 6, 1993)
- "Cruise" (April 4, 1994)
- "Grandparenting" (February 21, 1994)

== Reception ==
"Sex is recalled like a delirium after the fever has passed. Updike's men try to remember the visions love brought to them, but the only solid evidence is the debris littering the sickbed: children, ex-wives, divided property, self-distrust, regret. Death, on the contrary, is close and real, though often oddly reassuring in its approach." —Literary critic Micheal Harris in Facing the Realities of Aging, Death: The Afterlife and Other Stories, The Los Angeles Times, November 14, 1994.

Jay Parini of The New York Times offers a mixed appraisal of the collection, describing Updike's style as "fluent to a fault, rich in metaphor, rising to exquisite heights in places, toppling elsewhere into preciousness and affectation." Parini adds: "John Updike has rarely written more affectingly, more from the center of his being. Several of these stories will, I suspect, enjoy the kind of afterlife granted to few writers in any time or place."

Michael Harris of The Los Angeles Times declares that Updike's literary prowess undiminished in this collection:

We have come to take his stylistic brilliance and structural ingenuity for granted, and some of his habitual gestures—the Greek mythology, the swatches of travelog, the cool, brittle encounters between lovers—seem like tics."

In her work on Updike, Biljana Dojčinović has argued that his short story collection The Afterlife and Other Stories is a pivotal work that demonstrates a change in his writing on feminism.

== Sources ==
- Carduff, Christopher. 2013. Note on the Texts from John Updike: Collected Later Stories. Christopher Carduff, editor. The Library of America. pp. 948–958 ISBN 978-1-59853-252-4
- Harris, Michael. 1994. "Facing the Realities of Aging, Death: The Afterlife and Other Stories". The Los Angeles Times, November 14, 1994. Retrieved 21 March 2023.
- Luscher, Robert M. 1993. John Updike: A Study of the Short Fiction. Twayne Publishers, New York. ISBN 0-8057-0850-2
- Olster, Stacey. 2006. The Cambridge Companion to John Updike. Cambridge University Press, Cambridge. ISBN 0-521-60730-2 (paperback)
- Parini, Jay. 1994. "All His Wives Are Mothers". The New York Times. November 6, 1994. Retrieved 21 March 2023.
