= Henry Bech =

Fictional character created by John Updike

Henry Bech is a fictional character created by American author John Updike. Bech first appeared in the short story "The Bulgarian Poetess", published in the March 13, 1965 issue of The New Yorker. This and other Bech stories were later compiled in the books Bech: A Book (1970), Bech Is Back (1982), and Bech at Bay (1998). These books were all later collected in The Complete Henry Bech (2001), which also included the short story "His Oeuvre" (2000).

Updike's Bech is considered an antihero, and Updike's alter-ego. While Updike generally concerns himself with WASP culture, is married, and is prolific, Bech is apathetically Jewish, a bachelor (later a husband and stepfather for a time, and finally a father in old age), and unprolific. In the introduction to his first collection, the eponymous author speculates he is modeled in part after many other famous writers, including Norman Mailer, Bernard Malamud, J.D. Salinger and Updike himself.
