= The Carpentered Hen and Other Tame Creatures =

1958 poetry collection by John Updike

First edition (publ. Harper & Brothers)

The Carpentered Hen is the first poetry collection and first published book by John Updike, published by Harper in 1958.

== Composition ==
=== Light verse ===
Updike remarked in an interview collected by the Poetry Foundation that "I began as a writer of light verse, and have tried to carry over into my serious or lyric verse something of the strictness and liveliness of the lesser form." The poet Thomas M. Disch noted that because Updike was such a well-known novelist, his poetry "could be mistaken as a hobby or a foible"; Disch saw Updike's light verse instead as a poetry of "epigrammatical lucidity." His poetry has been praised for its engagement with "a variety of forms and topics," its "wit and precision," and for its depiction of topics familiar to American readers.

=== "Why the Telephone Wires Dip..." ===
The collection's seventh poem, "Why the Telephone Wires Dip and the Poles Are Cracked and Crooked," is carved in full on the reverse side of the writer's gravestone.

"The old men say
young men in gray
hung this thread across our plains
acres and acres ago.

But we, the enlightened, know
in point of fact it's what remains
of the flight of a marvellous crow
no one saw:
Each pole, a caw."

== Republication ==
This volume and its follow-up, Telephone Poles, was republished in a single-volume edition titled Verses. Several of the pieces in both were again reprinted in the author's collected edition, Collected Poems, published by Knopf in 1993.
