= Memories of the Ford Administration =

1992 novel by John Updike

- First edition cover
- Author: John Updike
- Cover artist: Chip Kidd
- Language: English
- Genre: Philosophical, War
- Publisher: Alfred A. Knopf
- Publication date: 1992
- Publication place: United States
- Media type: Print (hardcover) and (audio-CD)
- Pages: 369 pp
- ISBN: 0-679-41681-1
- OCLC: 26055447
- Dewey Decimal: 813/.54 20
- LC Class: PS3571.P4 M45 1992b

Memories of the Ford Administration is a 1992 novel by John Updike published by Knopf. The novel concerns a college professor's attempt to write a reminiscence of the Presidential administration of Gerald Ford while being distracted by events in his personal and professional life.

== Synopsis ==
Alf Clayton, a struggling history professor at Wayward Junior College in New Hampshire, receives a request from the Northern New England Association of American Historians (NNEAAH) to provide his memories and impressions of the Presidential administration of Gerald Ford. Clayton has spent several years unsuccessfully attempting to write a biography of President James Buchanan, and the two projects intertwine as Clayton's focus shifts between them. Simultaneously, Clayton's guilt over his extramarital affair with another professor at the college both influences and is influenced by the book about Buchanan.

== Major themes ==
The New York Times Book Review described the novel as "quintessential Updike, an exploration of a modern American terrain of desire, guilt and moral ambiguity that he has made distinctly his own." Updike uses Clayton and his rival professor Brent Mueller, an ardent deconstructionist, to comment on deconstruction and sexual politics. While Clayton hates Mueller for his adherence to deconstruction, he nonetheless finds himself utilizing the theory to justify his interest in a comparatively obscure president and assuage his guilt over the affair with Mueller's wife Geraldine.
