= Terrorist (novel) =

2006 novel by John Updike

- Author: John Updike
- Cover artist: Chip Kidd (designer)
- Language: English
- Genre: Psychological novel, Crime novel
- Publisher: Alfred A. Knopf
- Publication date: 2006
- Publication place: United States
- Media type: Print (hardcover) and (audio-CD)
- Pages: 310 pp
- ISBN: 0-307-26465-3
- OCLC: 62331102

Terrorist is a novel by American writer John Updike, published in 2006. It is the author's 15th standalone novel.

== Plot introduction ==
The story centers on an American-born Muslim teenager named Ahmad Ashmawy Mulloy, although Ahmad's high school life guidance counselor, Jack Levy, also plays a central role. The novel seeks to explore the worldview and motivations of religious fundamentalists (specifically within Islam), while at the same time dissecting the morals and lifeways of residents of the fictional decaying New Jersey Rust Belt suburb of "New Prospect" (which Updike has identified with Paterson, New Jersey, also the setting of his novel, In the Beauty of the Lilies).

== Plot ==
The novel begins with a brief monologue by Ahmad on the condition of American youth as represented by the student body mingling in the corridors of his high school. He gets into a fight with an older boy named Tylenol who thinks Ahmad is flirting with his girlfriend Joryleen. While Ahmad has sexual impulses toward the girl, he represses them due to his religious beliefs. Ahmad finds solace at his mosque (located in an abandoned dance studio above a bail bonds office) and in the study of the Qur'an under the guidance of his imam, Shaikh Rashid.

Supporting Ahmad at home is his rather negligent mother, Teresa Mulloy, a third-generation Irish American who, while raised as a Catholic, has abandoned her religious beliefs. Because of her religious infidelity and comparative openness toward sexuality and relationships with men, she has become one of the many objects of Ahmad's hatred – although in her case, she is accorded a dutiful love as well. On the other hand, Ahmad idolizes his absent father, an Egyptian immigrant who abandoned him and his mother when Ahmad was three years old.

One of Teresa's suitors in the story is Ahmad's guidance counselor, Jack Levy, who initially visits her to try and steer Ahmad toward college and away from his chosen career path as a truck driver. Levy is an American Jew who has abandoned practicing his religion yet (as many characters in the novel note) still maintains a stereotypical Jewish cynicism and depression. He can be just as critical as Ahmad about American culture, but rather than viewing it in terms of distance from God, he sees it as the outcome of historical events and naked greed.

For his part, Ahmad desires to become a truck driver on the advice of his imam because driving is a practical skill of good merit whereas academic studies serve only to advance (American) secular beliefs. He is also afraid that academic studies will strengthen his occasional religious doubt. Trucking is also the path that leads Ahmad toward involvement in a terrorist plot directed against the American "infidels" (non-Muslims) – an attempt to blow up the Lincoln Tunnel under the Hudson River.

Ahmad agrees to drive the truck into the tunnel in a suicide attack. On the day of the planned attack, his accomplices are not at their planned meeting place. Ahmad avoids arrest by federal agents and continues his mission alone. Driving the bomb-laden truck, he encounters Jack Levy on the side of the road before getting on the highway. Jack's sister-in-law Hermione Fogel has alerted him to Ahmad's involvement in a possible attack.

Jack rides into the Lincoln Tunnel with Ahmad and, while sitting in traffic, tries to convince him not to go through with the bombing. Jack reveals to Ahmad that the terrorist plot was a government sting and that his friend and co-conspirator Charlie Chehab was actually a CIA undercover agent who had his cover blown and was beheaded by others involved in the plot. Jack also admits to having an affair with Ahmad's mother for the past several months.

While approaching the planned location of the bombing, Ahmad reconsiders his interpretation of Islam, deciding that God does not want him to kill anyone, and aborts his terrorist mission. He and Jack ride through Manhattan together towards the George Washington Bridge to return to New Jersey.

== Main characters ==
Ahmad Ashmawy Mulloy
An 18-year-old radical Islamist who seeks jihad and to follow the "Straight Path". After taking vocational courses in high school (despite being intelligent enough to get into university), Ahmad is hired as a truck driver for Excellency Home Furnishings. He is coerced by his mentor and friend Charlie Chehab into participating in a bombing.
Joryleen Grant
A kindhearted African American classmate of Ahmad's. Ahmad is attracted to her, but initially resists her advances as he sees her as an unclean infidel. After high school she becomes a prostitute to support her shiftless boyfriend.
Tylenol Jones
Joryleen's African American boyfriend who resents Ahmad's interest in Joryleen and bullies him.
Teresa Mulloy
Ahmad's secular, liberal mother whose laissez-faire parenting style has allowed her son's blinding religious fanaticism to fester inside him and eventually erupt. Teresa has an affair with Jack Levy that lasts roughly three months.
Jack Levy
A guidance counselor at New Prospect High School who strives to get Ahmad enrolled in community college. Levy represents the typical Updikian character of a middle-class American who futilely attempts to escape his mundane prison of daily life, partly through sexual encounters.
Beth Levy
Jack's overweight wife who, when she is not working as a part-time librarian, spends her afternoons watching soap operas and eating cookies. She has become a constant reminder of Jack's own mediocrity.
Hermione Fogel
Beth's sister who works as an assistant to the director of the U.S. Department of Homeland Security.
Charlie Chehab
Ahmad's partner at Excellency Home Furnishings who recruits him for a bombing plot.
Shaikh Rashid
Ahmad's imam and mentor. He secures him the job at Excellency and manipulates him into assisting in a bombing plot.
