= James Wood (critic) =

English literary critic, essayist and novelist (born 1965)

- Born: 1 November 1965 (age 60); Durham, County Durham, England
- Education: Jesus College, Cambridge
- Occupation: Literary critic
- Employer(s): Harvard University; The New Yorker
- Spouse: Claire Messud (m. 1992)
- Children: 2
- Writing career
- Notable awards: Young Journalist of the Year; Berlin Prize Fellowship

James Douglas Graham Wood (born 1 November 1965) is an English^{[a]} literary critic, essayist and novelist.

Wood was The Guardian's chief literary critic between 1992 and 1995. He was a senior editor at The New Republic between 1995 and 2007. As of 2014, he is Professor of the Practice of Literary Criticism at Harvard University and a staff writer at The New Yorker.

== Early life and education ==
James Wood was born in Durham, England, to Dennis William Wood (born 1928), a Dagenham-born minister and professor of zoology at Durham University, and Sheila Graham Wood, née Lillia, a schoolteacher from Scotland.

Wood was raised in Durham in an evangelical wing of the Church of England, an environment he describes as austere and serious. He was educated at Durham Chorister School (on a music scholarship) and at Eton College (with the support of a bursary based on his parents' "demonstrated financial need"; his older brother attended Eton as a King's Scholar). He read English Literature at Jesus College, Cambridge, where in 1988 he graduated with a First.

== Career ==
=== Writing ===
After Cambridge, Wood "holed up in London in a vile house in Herne Hill and started trying to make it as a reviewer". He began his career by reviewing books for The Guardian. In 1990, he won Young Journalist of the Year at the British Press Awards. From 1991 to 1995, Wood was the chief literary critic of The Guardian, and in 1994 he served as a judge for the Booker Prize for fiction.

In 1995, he became a senior editor at The New Republic in the United States. In 2007 Wood left his role at The New Republic to become a staff writer at The New Yorker. Wood's reviews and essays have appeared frequently in The New York Times, The New Yorker, the New York Review of Books, and the London Review of Books where he is a member of its editorial board. He and his wife, the novelist Claire Messud, are on the editorial board of the literary magazine The Common, based at Amherst College.

=== Teaching ===
Wood began teaching literature in a class he co-taught with the late novelist Saul Bellow at Boston University. Wood also taught at Kenyon College in Ohio, and since September 2003 has taught half time at Harvard University, first as a Visiting Lecturer and then as Professor of the Practice of Literary Criticism.

In 2010–11, he was the Weidenfeld Visiting Professor of European Comparative Literature in St Anne's College, Oxford.

=== Ideas ===
Like the critic Harold Bloom, Wood advocates an aesthetic approach to literature, rather than the more ideologically driven trends that are popular in contemporary academic literary criticism. In an interview with The Harvard Crimson Wood explains that the "novel exists to be affecting... to shake us profoundly. When we're rigorous about feeling, we're honoring that". The reader, then, should approach the text as a writer, "which is [about] making aesthetic judgments".

Wood coined the term 'hysterical realism', which he used to denote the contemporary conception of the "big, ambitious novel" that pursues vitality "at all costs". 'Hysterical realism' describes novels that are characterised by chronic length, manic characters, frenzied action, and frequent digressions on topics secondary to the story. In response to an essay Wood wrote on the subject, author Zadie Smith described hysterical realism as a:

painfully accurate term for the sort of overblown, manic prose to be found in novels like my own White Teeth... [yet] any collective term for a supposed literary movement is always too large a net, catching significant dolphins among so much cannable tuna. You cannot place first-time novelists with literary giants, New York hipsters with Kilburn losers, and some of the writers who got caught up with me are undeserving of the criticism.

Wood coined the term commercial realism, which he identifies with the author Graham Greene, and, in particular, with his book The Heart of the Matter. He clarified it as attention to the minutiae of daily life, taking in mind elements of the everyday that are important owing to their supposed lack of importance. He believes it to be an effective style of writing because it captures reality by depicting banal features as well as interesting ones.

Wood emphasises throughout the book How Fiction Works (particularly in the final chapter) that the most important literary style is realism. He states:

When I talk about free indirect style I am really talking about point of view, and when I talk about point of view I am really talking about the perception of detail, and when I talk about detail I'm really talking about character, and when I talk about character I am really talking about the real, which is at the bottom of my inquiries.

Wood additionally attests to the significance of Flaubert in developing the form of the novel:

Novelists should thank Flaubert the way poets thank spring; it all begins again with him. There really is a time before Flaubert and a time after him. Flaubert decisively established what most readers and writers think of as modern realist narration, and his influence is almost too familiar to be visible. We hardly remark of good prose that it favors the telling and brilliant detail; that it privileges a high degree of visual noticing; that it maintains an unsentimental composure and knows how to withdraw, like a good valet, from superfluous commentary; that it judges good and bad neutrally; that it seeks out the truth, even at the cost of repelling us; and that the author's fingerprints on all this are paradoxically, traceable but not visible. You can find some of this in Defoe or Austen or Balzac, but not all of it until Flaubert.

== Reception ==
In reviewing one of his works, Adam Begley of the Financial Times wrote that Wood "is the best literary critic of his generation".

Martin Amis described Wood as "a marvellous critic, one of the few remaining." Fellow book reviewer and journalist Christopher Hitchens was fond of Wood's work, in one case giving his students a copy of Wood's review of the John Updike novel Terrorist, citing it as far better than his own.

In the 2004 issue of n+1, the editors criticised both Wood and The New Republic, writing:

Poor James Wood! Now here was a talent—but an odd one, with a narrow, aesthetician's interests and idiosyncratic tastes... In the company of other critics who wrote with such seriousness, at such length, in such old-fashioned terms, he would have been less burdened with the essentially parodic character of his enterprise.

Wood wrote a reply in the Fall 2005 issue, explaining his conception of the "autonomous novel" and pointing out the editors' hypocrisy in criticizing negative book reviews in an essay that was "itself a wholly negative attack on negativity":

There I was, waiting for the sweets of positivity, for the proposals and manifestos and counterarguments, only to find the merest dusting of kiddies' sugar: "And what can we do, with thirty-six weeks left on our discount subscription [to the New Republic]? Forget about it. We're young yet: so we'll go and be among the young." Perhaps this was ironically intended; a few lines earlier there had emerged the stronger hint of a proposal ... Positive individuality; the cultivation of "something new" (anything, as long as it is something?); a connection to the Great Tradition; and... youth! One of the editors, Keith Gessen, could be found on the last page of the magazine writing: "It is time to say what you mean." Indeed, but what do you mean? The Editors had unwittingly proved the gravamen of their own critique: that it is easier to criticize than to propose.

In response, the n+1 editors devoted a large portion of the journal's subsequent issue to a roundtable on the state of contemporary literature and criticism.

Upon the publication of Wood's first collection of essays, The Broken Estate, in 1999, Harold Bloom wrote that Wood is "an authentic literary critic, very rare in this bad time." However, in a 2008 interview with Vice magazine, Bloom stated:

Oh, don't even mention [Wood]. He doesn't exist. He just does not exist at all. [...] There are period pieces in criticism as there are period pieces in the novel and in poetry. The wind blows and they will go away. [...] A publisher wanted to send me [Wood's] book and I said, "Please don't." [...] I told them, "Please don't bother to send it." I didn't want to have to throw it out. There's nothing to the man. He also has—and I haven't ever read him on me—but I'm told he wrote a vicious review of me in The New Republic, which I never look at anyway, in which he clearly evidenced, as one of my old friends put it, a certain anxiety of influence. I don't want to talk about him.

== Awards ==
Wood was a recipient of the 2010/2011 Berlin Prize Fellowship from the American Academy in Berlin. He was elected a Fellow of the Royal Society of Literature in 2011.

== Personal life ==
In 1992, Wood married Claire Messud, an American novelist. They reside in Cambridge, Massachusetts, and have a daughter, Livia, and a son, Lucian.

== Selected works ==
- The Broken Estate : Essays on Literature and Belief. 1999.
- The Irresponsible Self : On Laughter and the Novel. 2004.
- How Fiction Works. 2008.
- The Fun Stuff. 2012.
- The Nearest Thing to Life. 2015.
- Upstate. 2018.

== Notes ==
^{a} Wood has written the following: "I have made a home in the United States, but it is not quite Home. For instance, I have no desire to become an American citizen. Recently, when I arrived at Boston, the immigration officer commented on the length of time I've held a Green Card. 'A Green Card is usually considered a path to citizenship,' he said, a sentiment both irritatingly reproving and movingly patriotic. I mumbled something about how he was perfectly correct, and left it at that. [...] The poet and novelist Patrick McGuinness, in his forthcoming book Other People's Countries (itself a rich analysis of home and homelessness; McGuinness is half-Irish and half-Belgian) quotes Simenon, who was asked why he didn't change his nationality, 'the way successful francophone Belgians often did'. Simenon replied: 'There was no reason for me to be born Belgian, so there's no reason for me to stop being Belgian.' I wanted to say something similar, less wittily, to the immigration officer: precisely because I don't need to become an American citizen, to take citizenship would seem flippant; leave its benefits for those who need a new land."
