= Of the Farm =

1965 novel by John Updike

- First edition
- Author: John Updike
- Language: English
- Publisher: Alfred A. Knopf
- Publication date: 1965
- Publication place: United States

Of the Farm is a 1965 novel by the American author John Updike. Of the Farm was his fourth novel. The story concerns Joey Robinson, a divorced, thirty-five-year-old Manhattan advertising executive who visits his mother on her unfarmed farm in rural Pennsylvania. He has come with his new wife, Peggy and her son, Richard, a precocious eleven-year-old. The novel explores both Joey's relationship to his widowed mother, a flinty woman who reveres her farm, and to Peggy, a kind, sensual woman. Joey feels guilt for leaving his mother, and anger at her stubborn refusal to leave the farm, and anger at her from having uprooted his late father from the suburbs to move to the farm decades ago. Joey is buffeted by doubt, angst, and anger, and is pinballed between his dueling mother and Peggy.

== Critical Assessment ==
Writing in 1971, literary critic Larry E. Taylor locates the significance of Of the Farm within Updike's oeuvre:

John Updike has not written anything as hopeful as Of the Farm since 1965. And in his most recent works, the “genuine” lyricism and pastoralism in Of the Farm have been reduced to painfully ironic norms by which spiritual distance and psychological loss are judged...[T]o this date, Updike has written nothing so eloquent, so luxurious, and so sanely beneficent as Of the Farm.

== Theme ==
“Of the Farm is very brief and unpretentious, but it is still a book of a deliberate stylist, and the style sometimes subsists on its own, unrelated to the simple events it is intended to serve. The story seems to a European reader to be very American.”—British author and critic Anthony Burgess from “Review of Of the Farm in Commonweal

Author and critic Stacey Olster considers Of the Farm “one of Updike’s most contentious and angry narratives” signaling Updike's literary departure from the settings of the fictional Olinger. Olster writes:

The story centers on Joey's mother’s rejection of his second wife Peggy, a rejection that violently separates the adult Joey from his childhood self. Olinger and the farm near it are an Eden so fallen as to be undesirable...Of the Farm represents his farewell to Olinger as a nostalgic setting that might provide his characters with opportunities for growth and development, if only through an awareness that they must leave.

== Sources ==
- Burgess, Anthony. 1966. “Language, Myth and Mr. Updike” from Commonweal, 83, February 11, 1966 in Critical Essays on John Updike G. K. Hall & Co., Boston Massachusetts. William R. MacNaughton, editor. pp. 55-58. ISBN 0-8161-8467-4
- Taylor, Larry E. 1971. The Wide-Hipped Wife and the Painted Landscape: Pastoral Ideals in Of the Farm from Carbondale: Southern Illinois University Press, 1971 (pp. 102-111) in Critical Essays on John Updike G. K. Hall & Co., Boston Massachusetts. William R. MacNaughton, editor. pp. 140-147. ISBN 0-8161-8467-4
- Olster, Stacey. 2006. The Cambridge Companion to John Updike. Cambridge University Press, Cambridge. ISBN 0-521-60730-2 (paperback)
