= Couples (novel) =

Novel by John Updike

- First edition
- Author: John Updike
- Language: English
- Publisher: Knopf
- Publication date: 1968
- Publication place: United States
- Pages: 458
- ISBN: 978-0006812999
- LC Class: PZ4.U64 Co3

Couples is a 1968 novel by American author John Updike.

== Overview ==
The novel depicts the lives of a promiscuous circle of ten couples in the small Massachusetts town of Tarbox. (When he composed the book, the author was living in Ipswich, Massachusetts.)

Much of the plot of Couples (which opens on the evening of March 24, 1962, and integrates historical events like the loss of the USS Thresher on April 10, 1963, the Profumo affair, and the Kennedy assassination in November 1963) concerns the efforts of its characters to balance the pressures of Protestant sexual mores against increasingly flexible American attitudes toward sex in the 1960s. The book suggests that this relaxation may have been driven by the development of birth control and the opportunity to enjoy what one character refers to as "the post-pill paradise".

The novel is rich in period detail. (In 2009, USA Today called it a "time capsule" of the era.) The lyrical and explicit descriptions of sex, unusual for the time, made the book somewhat notorious. Time had reserved a cover story for Updike and the novel before knowing what it was about; after actually reading it they were embarrassed, and discovered that "the higher up it went in the Time hierarchy, the less they liked it."

The ten couples are:

- Piet and Angela Hanema (children: Ruth and Nancy) – he is a building contractor
- Roger and Bea Guerin
- Frank and Janet Appleby (children: Franklin Jr. and Catharine) – he is a trust officer in a bank
- Harold and Marcia Smith / "little-Smith" (children: Jonathan, Julia, Hennetta) – he is a broker
- Freddy and Georgene Thorne (children: Whitney, Martha, Judy) – he is a dentist
- Matt and Terry Gallagher (child: Tommy) – he is Piet's business partner, a contractor
- Eddie and Carol Constantine (children: Kevin, Laura, Patrice) – he is an airline pilot
- Ben and Irene Saltz (children: Laura, Bernard, Jeremiah) – he works for the government
- John and Bernadette Ong – he is a nuclear physicist
- Ken and "Foxy" (Elizabeth Fox) Whitman – he is a scientist

== Plot ==
At the center of the amorous round robin is Piet Hanema. His first affair is with Georgene, but he leaves her for pregnant Foxy. At the same time the "Little-Smiths" swap partners with the Appleby couple. Harold and Janet keep their affair secret, while they know about the affair of Frankie and Marcia. After Foxy gives birth to her son, Piet loses interest and has a fling with Bea Guerin. Foxy informs Piet that she has become pregnant again as the result of their final liaison. They try to arrange a discreet abortion and seek help from Freddy. He offers aid but, as revenge for Piet's affair with his wife Georgene, demands a night with Piet's wife Angela in return. Angela consents, but Freddy turns out to be impotent, at least for the act itself. On the verge of the abortion in Boston, Foxy breaks down with second thoughts about losing the baby.

Angela wants to leave Piet and suggests he should marry Foxy, who has separated from Ken. Piet temporarily finds comfort but no satisfaction in the arms of Bea Guerin. Eventually Angela tells Piet to leave her house, and for a period he lives on his own, having become a pariah among the couples of Tarbox. His partner Gallagher suggests a separation too and pays him off. In a final scene Piet and the society of Tarbox witness a fire that destroys the local church. The following years are summarized in a short final passage: Angela took a job as teacher and got a divorce, shortly after Piet married Foxy and they moved to Lexington, where they found new friends.

== Reception ==
The novel was widely and enthusiastically reviewed, landing Updike on the cover of Time magazine, a rare location for an author. Time, while detailing similarities between real Ipswich and fictional Tarbox, called the book "sensational". Critic and novelist Wilfred Sheed, in the New York Times Book Review, found Couples "ingenious" and "scorching...the games are described with loving horror." Addressing the novel's famous frankness about sexual manners, Sheed wrote, "If this is a dirty book, I don't see how sex can be written about at all. Updike's treatment of sex is central to his method, which is that of a fictional biochemist approaching mankind with a tray of hypersensitive gadgets." More recently, Martin Amis dismissed Couples as one of the author's lesser works. Writing in the Los Angeles Review of Books in 2016, Meghan O’Gieblyn explored the book's implications in light of feminist perspectives.

== Cultural significance ==
Couples is often cited as a historically important depiction of the sexual revolution of the 1960s, along with Philip Roth's Portnoy's Complaint (1969) and Gore Vidal's Myra Breckinridge (1968). In 1993, Edward Sorel illustrated the authors as a trio of satyrs.

== Updike on Couples ==
Updike had intended to call the novel, "in honor of its amplitude", Couples and Houses and Days. To an interviewer's question about the difficulty of writing scenes about sex, Updike replied: "They were no harder than landscapes and a little more interesting. It's wonderful the way people in bed talk, the sense of voices and the sense of warmth, so that as a writer you become kind of warm also. The book is, of course, not about sex as such: It's about sex as the emergent religion, as the only thing left." And in the Paris Review "Art of Fiction" interview series, he discussed the disappearance of his novel's hero into the story's happy ending:

There's also a way, though, I should say, in which, with the destruction of the church, with the removal of Piet's guilt, he becomes insignificant. He becomes merely a name in the last paragraph: he becomes a satisfied person and in a sense dies. In other words, a person who has what he wants, a satisfied person, a content person, ceases to be a person. Unfallen Adam is an ape. Yes, I guess I do feel that. I feel that to be a person is to be in a situation of tension, is to be in a dialectical situation. A truly adjusted person is not a person at all—just an animal with clothes on or a statistic. So that it's a happy ending, with this 'but' at the end.
