= The Witches of Eastwick (disambiguation) =

The Witches of Eastwick is a novel by John Updike.

The Witches of Eastwick may also refer to:

- The Witches of Eastwick (film), a 1987 adaptation of the novel
- The Witches of Eastwick (musical), a 2000 musical based on the novel
- Eastwick (TV series), a 2009 television series based on the novel

== See also ==
- The Widows of Eastwick, a 2008 sequel to the novel written by John Updike
