= Brno City Theatre =

Theatre in Brno, Czechia

- Městské divadlo Brno
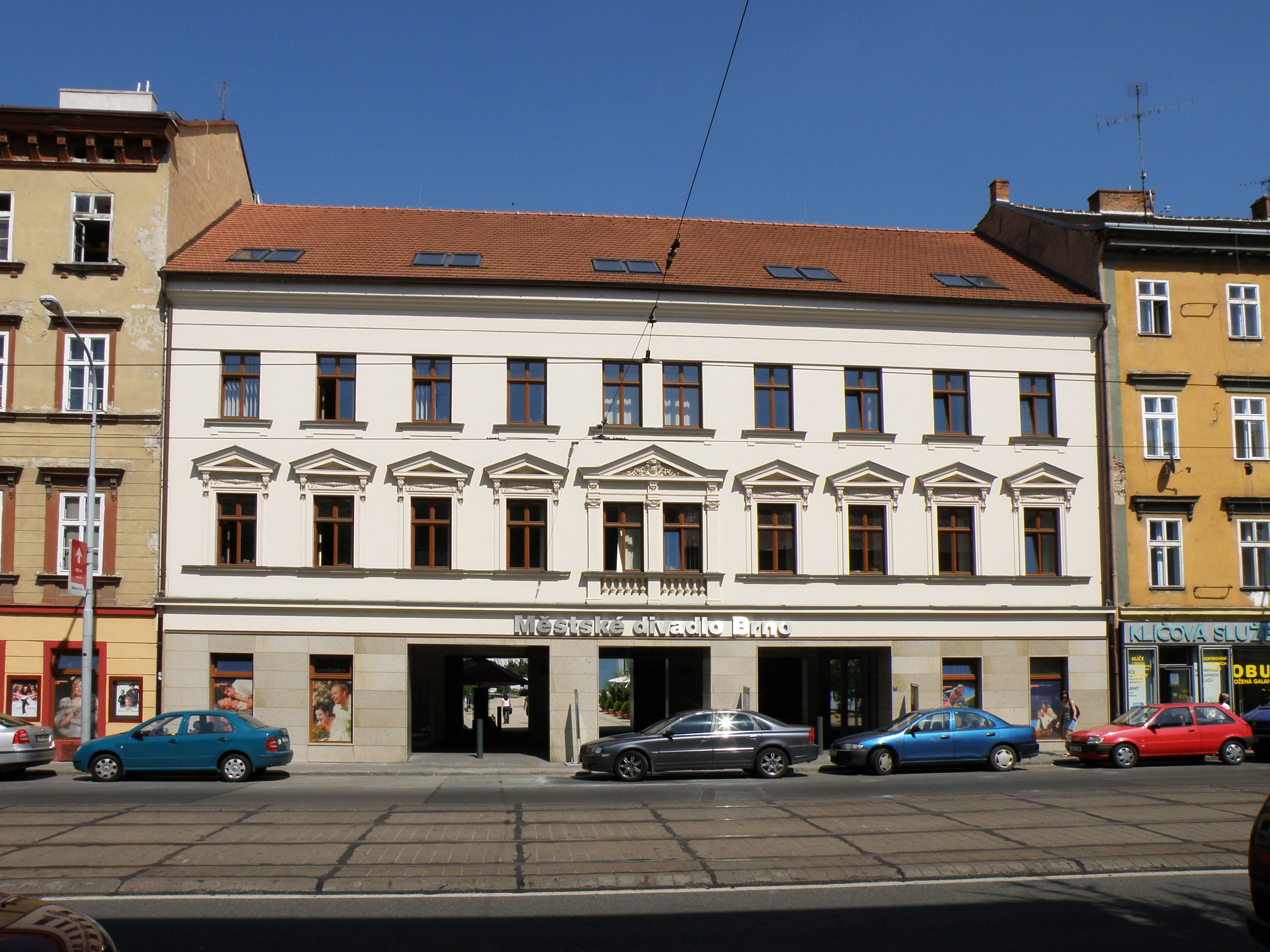
- Main entrance from the Lidická street
- Interactive map of Brno City Theatre
- Address: Lidická 16; 602 00 Brno; Brno; Czech Republic
- Coordinates: 49°12′4.909″N 16°36′29.31″E

Construction
- Rebuilt: 1995 - dramatical scene
- Architects: Roman Mach and Josef Kubín – musical scene Heinrich Fanta – dramatical scene Miroslav Melena – dramatical sc. reconstruction

Website
- https://www.mdb.cz/

Brno City Theatre (Czech: Městské divadlo Brno; MdB) is a repertoire theatre in Brno, Czech Republic, that focuses on dramatic and music production, mainly musical theatre. The building of the theatre is located on Lidická street in town square Brno-center. It has two acting areas – dramatical scene (capacity 365 places) and musical theatre scene (capacity 680 places). As of 2011, the manager and director of the theatre is Stanislav Moša, art manager of the musical ensemble is Petr Gazdík and operetta manager is Igor Ondříček.

The MdB has a large ensemble and a broad audience

There are many different art pieces in both of its musical and dramatic repertoire, lot of space is dedicated for many new works, which are often written directly for MdB. The theatre also has its own orchestra, so the audience can experience live scenic music.

== History ==
The former Svobodné divadlo (Free Theatre) on Falkensteiner Street was founded closely after World War II, in summer 1945, by people around director Milan Pásek, supported by professor Jiří Kroha. Since its beginning it hosted mainly young artists, which sought to found second theatre in the city (the first one was Mahenovo divadlo (Mahen Theatre), where they could perform plays by contemporary writers. The theatre has changed its name by the time: Městské a oblastní divadlo (Municipal and Regional Theatre), Krajské oblastní divadlo (County and regional theatre) and in 1962 Divadlo bratří Mrštíků (Mrštík Brothers Theatre).

In 1988, by decision of a new regulation, the theatre was merged with some quite genre different theatres – satirical theatre Večerní Brno and puppet theatre Loutkové divadlo Radost.

After the Velvet revolution the theatre was renamed the Městské divadlo Brno (Municipal Theatre Brno) and in 1990 Jan Kolegar was elected as its director. Jan Moša, former producer, dramatist and since 1990 the artistic director of drama, became the director in 1992. He was responsible for the reconstruction of insufficient places at former cinema on Lidická street, where the theatre now resides.

In the 1990s the declining scene, that had great distress of the audience, has become one of the most successful theatres not only in Brno, but throughout the country.

In 1995 the MdB went through reconstruction, mainly modification of the theatre scene itself. In addition to changes of building the ensemble of theatre was also renewed. In the 1990s the MdB has focused mainly on quality musical theatre production, using graduates of the musical acting classes at the Janáček Academy of Music and Performing Arts.

== Notable actors ==
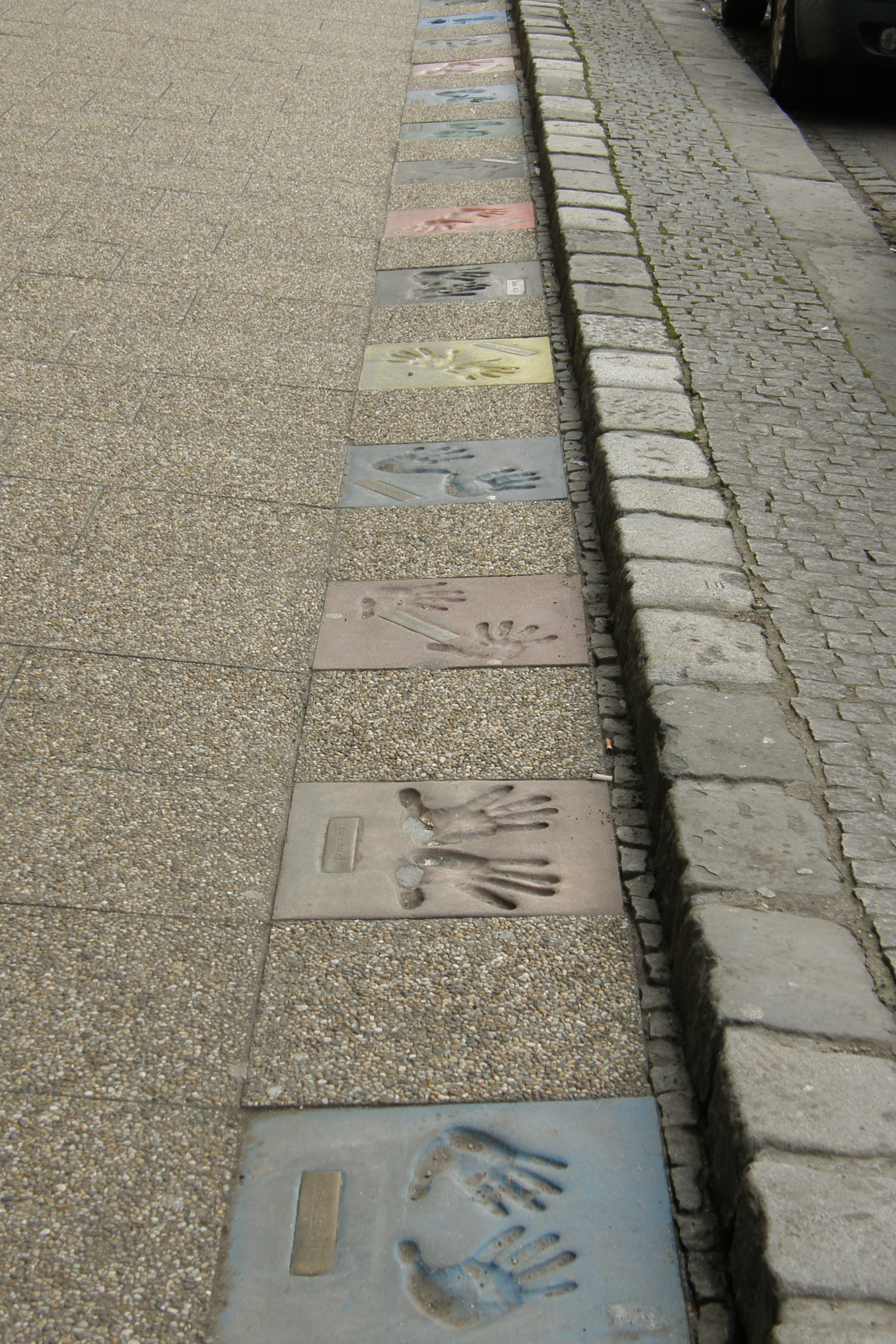
Palmprints in the walk of fame

The actors of this theatre were awarded with several Thalia Awards and Alfréd Radok Awards. The theatre has even walk of fame for its most brilliant actors since 2000.

Historical	Current
Vilma Nováčková; Otakar Dadák; Josef Štefl; Dagmar Pistorová; Jiřina Prokšová; Jana Hliňáková; Stanislav Zindulka; Jaroslav Kuneš; Erik Pardus	Alena Antalová; Dušan Vitázek; Petr Gazdík; Petr Štěpán; Martin Havelka; Hana Holišová; Pavla Vitázková; Lukáš Hejlík; Zdena Herfortová

== Choice of current actings ==
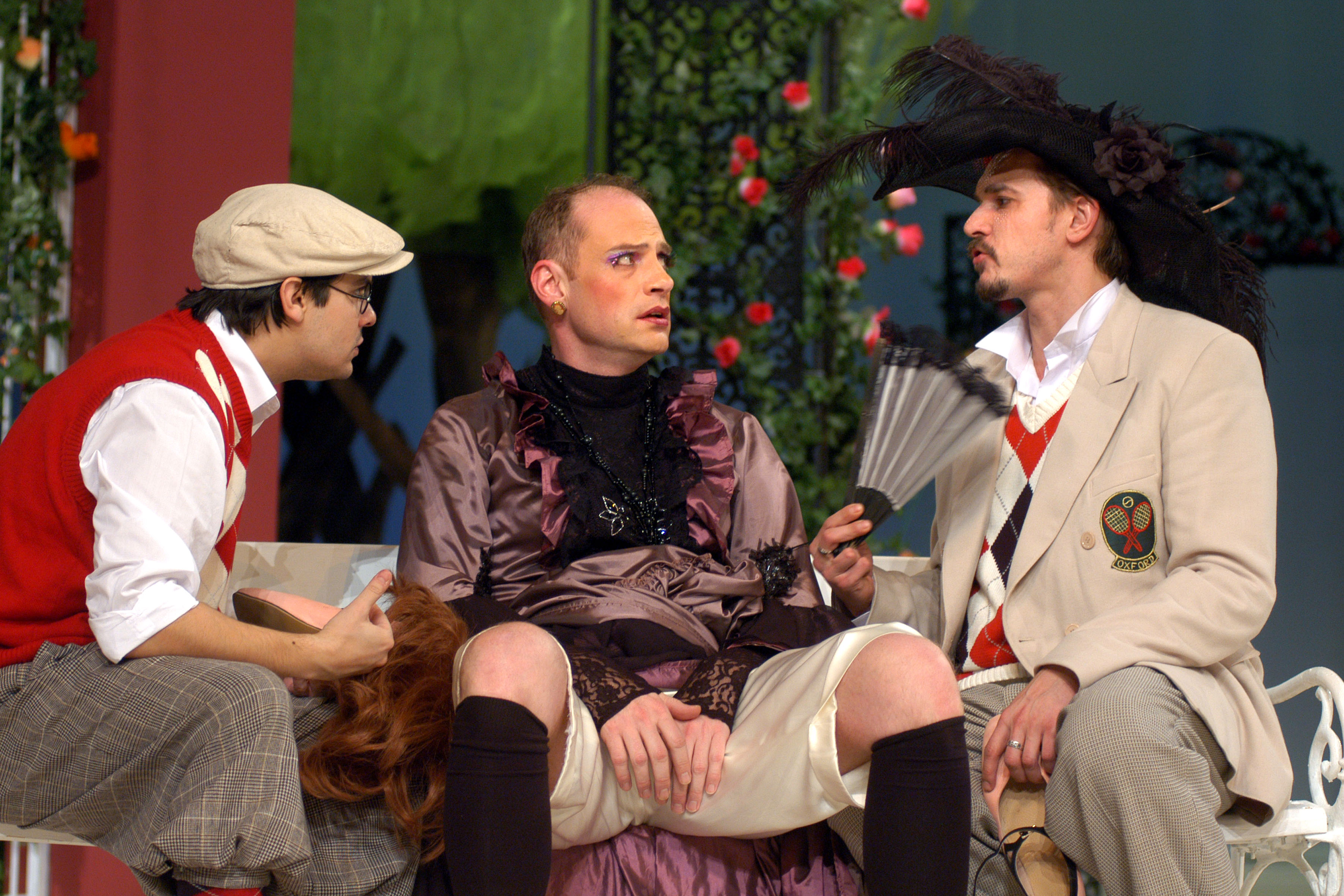
Charley's aunt

There are many different art pieces in both of theaters musical and dramatic repertoire, lot of space is dedicated for many new works, which are often written directly for MdB. The classical pieces (e.g., Devotion to the Cross by Pedro Calderón de la Barca) are also played often.

- Betlém (Bethlehem)
- Brouk v hlavě (A Flea in Her Ear)
- Dokonalá svatba (Perfect Wedding)
- Charleyova teta (Charley's Aunt)
- Dobře rozehraná partie (Eine Gute Partie)
- Zkrocení zlé ženy (The Taming of the Shrew)
- Sluha dvou pánů (Servant of Two Masters)
- Škola základ života (School, the Foundation of Life)
- Sugar! (Někdo to rád horké) (Sugar)
- Tři sestry (Three Sisters)
- West Side Story
- Sny svatojánských nocí (A Midsummer Night's Dream)
- Josef a jeho úžasný pestrobarevný plášť (Joseph and the Amazing Technicolor Dreamcoat)
- Muzikály z Broadwaye (Golden Broadway)
- My Fair Lady
- Jesus Christ Superstar
- Čarodějky z Eastwicku (The Witches of Eastwick)
- Bídníci (Les Misérables)
- Probuzení jara (Spring Awakening)
- Mary Poppins (Mary Poppins)
- Cats
