= The Kingdom of Paramithi =

- Genre: Children's television series
- Created by: Anthony Field; Paul Field
- Starring: Simon Pryce; Carolyn Ferrie; John Rowe; Kendall Goddard
- Opening theme: "The Kingdom of Paramithi"
- Country of origin: Australia
- Original language: English
- No. of seasons: 1
- No. of episodes: 30 (standard); 52 (split versions)

Production
- Executive producers: Murray Cook; Jeff Fatt; Anthony Field; Mike Conway
- Running time: 30 minutes (standard); 7 minutes (split versions)
- Production company: The Wiggles Pty Ltd

Original release
- Network: Nine Network
- Release: 10 November – 22 December 2008

The Kingdom of Paramithi is an Australian children's television series first screened on the Nine Network on 10 November 2008. The series is created by The Wiggles and Nickelodeon, with 30 half-hour episodes for pre-school children.

The Kingdom of Paramithi is a fairy tale series with stories, songs and dance. Paramithi is a Greek word for fairy tale. The series has been created by Anthony Field and Paul Field, written by Paul Field and Paul Paddick and developed with the experience of The Wiggles production team.

The program later aired on Nick Jr. in December 2008 and ABC2 (via Wiggly Waffle) on May 2, 2011. The program also aired internationally on the ATV World channel in Hong Kong.

== Characters ==
- King John (Simon Pryce)
- Queen Isabella (Carolyn Ferrie)
- James (John Rowe)
- Genevieve (Kendall Goddard)
- Anastasia (Cassie Howarth)
- Johnny (John Martin)
- Mario (Paul Paddick)
- Bobby (Brad Carroll)
- Bernadette (Fiona Sullivan)
- Sarah (Jennifer Andrade)
- Carlos (Fernando Jorge Moguel)

== Episodes ==
#	Title	Summary	Air Date
1	Cinderella	King John and Queen Isabella tell the story of "Cinderella" based on stories by Charles Perrault so at the Paramithi theatre the guests on the show starring the cast of Sarah portrayed as Cinderella, Bernadette portrayed as the Wicked Stepmother, Carlos portrayed as Handsome Prince and Bobby portrayed as The King	10 November 2008
2	Robin Hood	Genevieve shows the King and Queen some ballet spring pointes, then it's off to the library to see what story is in the Paramithi Storybook today. It is Robin Hood! After a fun reading and act of the tale, Mario designs costumes in shades of green and Johnny is ready to assist in the performance of Robin Hood in the Paramithi theatre. Bobby the policeman plays the lead role of Robin Hood, while Sarah plays Maid Marion. It's a swashbuckling success!	21 November 2008
3	The Princess and the Frog	King John tries James' skin cream with hilarious results! Then it's off to the royal library to find out what today's story is inside the Paramithi Storybook. It is The Princess and the Frog! After the Queen reads the tale, she suggests that it's turned into a performance at the Paramithi theatre. Genevieve makes sure that the costumes and set are ready, while James organises the cast. Carlos plays the frog while Bernadette plays the Princess. It's a r‐r‐r‐r‐r‐riveting show!	19 November 2008
4	Three Little Pigs	The King and Queen of Paramithi present the Medal of Paramithi to Alang for completing her chores each day, and then they are entertained by the Royal Dance Troupe. They perform ballet for the King and Queen. Next, it's time to find out what today's story is in the Paramithi Storybook. It is The Three Little Pigs, a story first published in the 18th century. After a fun reading and act of the tale, Genevieve and James set out to produce it as a musical performance for the people of Paramithi. James finds that he is missing someone to play the third pig for the show, but luckily the King decides to step in and help them out. The King steals the show with a porker of a performance!	22 November 2008
5	Aladdin and His Magic Lamp	The King and Queen of Paramithi are so happy that they sing in the Royal Throne Room! After finishing their royal duties they proceed to the royal library to see what story is in the Paramithi Storybook. It is Aladdin and His Magic Lamp, a story first printed in the ancient Arabic book, One Thousand and One Nights. The King suggests that Genevieve and James organise a performance of the tale in the Paramithi theatre with music, dancing and singing. Carlos plays the lead role of Aladdin and Bobby plays the genie of the lamp. The performance is truly magical!	24 November 2008
6	Goldilocks and the Three Bears	The King and Queen present The Medal of Paramithi to young Marcfranco for eating tasty vegetables every day. After finishing their royal duties the King and Queen retire to the library to find what story is contained in the Paramithi Storybook. It's Goldilocks and the Three Bears, which was popularised in the 1800s by the poet Robert Southley. After a fun reading and act of the tale, Genevieve and James set out to produce it as a musical performance for the people of Paramithi. Sarah performs as Goldilocks and Bobby, Carlos and Bernadette are the three bears. It's a growling good show!	25 November 2008
7	Jack and the Beanstalk	Today Felix is receiving the Medal of Paramithi for eating three serves of fruit every day! The King and Queen go to the library to see the clues for the tale that's in the Paramithi Storybook. They find a jack, a giant handkerchief and a bean. The story is Jack and the Beanstalk, a tale that originated in Europe many centuries ago. After reading the story, James and Genevieve set out to produce a show of the tale. Carlos performs as Jack, Bobby is the giant and Sarah is the goose that lays the golden egg. The show is a giant success!	27 November 2008
8	Androcles and the Lion	The King and Queen present the Medal of Paramithi to Christobel, as she always washes her hands with soap before she eats and after going to the bathroom. Next the Marching Soldiers give a grand performance before it's off to the library to find out what tale the Paramithi Storybook holds today. It's Androcles and the Lion, one of Aesop's tales from Ancient Greece. After reading the tale, the King thinks it would be better performed in front of an audience, so James and Genevieve set out to produce the show. Androlcles and the Lion is a roaring success!	31 November 2008
9	Beauty and the Beast	Every day is a special day in the Kingdom of Paramithi! Christobel is awarded the Medal of Paramithi for sweeping the floors all week. Once the royal duties are complete, the King and Queen go to the library to find what story is inside the Paramithi Storybook today. It's Beauty and the Beast, a story dating back to France in the 16th century. Genevieve and James organise a performance of the story at the King and Queen's request. Bobby plays the beast and Sarah plays Beauty. The show is truly 'beauty‐ful'!	1 December 2008
10	Pinocchio	The King and Queen present the Medal of Paramithi, and today it goes to Madeleine for remembering to say 'please' and 'thank you' every day. The Paramithi Dance Troupe gives a spectacular performance then it's time to discover the story in the Paramithi Storybook. It is Pinocchio, a tale first printed in Italy in 1883 by Carlo Collodi. Then it's lights, costumes, make up and time for the show in the Paramithi theatre. Carlos plays Pinocchio while James and Genevieve as producers pull the strings for the performance!	2 December 2008
11	Captain Jeremiah and the Spanish Gold	Genevieve loves to dance ballet and today she is showing the King and Queen how to do the arabesque. The King attempts the dance move with hilarious results! Then it's off to the royal library to see which tale is in the Paramithi Storybook. It's Captain Jeremiah and the Spanish Gold. The Queen reads the story while Genevieve and James act it out, then it's time to produce the tale as a performance for the people of Paramithi. While Mario makes some beautiful costumes and Johnny finds some props, the General of the Paramithi Marching Band sings a special song. The story of Captain Jeremiah is a‐a‐a‐a‐arghfully good!	3 December 2008
12	The Nightingale	The King and Queen of Paramithi join James and Genevieve and present the Medal of Paramithi to young Jade for going to the toilet by herself every day. Then it is time to watch a performance from the Paramithi Dance Troupe. After the royal duties are performed, the King and Queen set off to the royal library to find out what today's story is inside the Paramithi Storybook. It is The Nightingale by Danish poet and author, Hans Christian Andersen. After a fun reading and act of the tale, costumes and props are made and a cast is found to perform in the Paramithi theatre. The Nightingale performance is really...tweet. All of the singing and dancing inspires King John to dance with Queen Isabella!	4 December 2008
13	The Tortoise and the Hare	James has a cooking dilemma; he is helping the Paramithi cook by stirring the fruitcake batter, but doesn't know when to stop! And so he sings The Batter Song to help fix the problem. Once the royal duties are complete, the King and Queen go to find what story is inside the Paramithi Storybook. It's The Tortoise and the Hare, one of Aesop's fables from ancient Greece. Genevieve and James organise a performance of the story and it's ready, set, show! Carlos performs as the tortoise and Sarah plays the hare. It's a 'harey' exciting show! Then the King and Queen enjoy a dance in the royal throne room.	5 December 2008
14	The Princess and the Pea	The King and Queen present the Medal of Paramithi to Felix for smiling every day! Then there is a special performance by the Marching Soldiers. With their royal duties finished, the King and Queen go to see what is in the Paramithi Storybook. It is The Princess and the Pea, one of Hans Christian Andersen's shortest yet most known tales. King John thinks the story would be better performed in front of an audience, so James and Genevieve set out to produce the show. Sarah plays the princess and Bobby plays the handsome prince. The show is 'pea‐perfect'!	6 December 2008
15	The Brave Little Tailor	King John tries James' special toothpaste with hilarious results! Once the royal duties are complete, the King and Queen adjourn to the royal library to find out what today's story is inside the Paramithi Storybook. First they try to guess the story from the clues that are on the library table. There's a tailor's measuring tape, a pretend dead fly and the number seven. The story is The Brave Little Tailor, a tale originating from Germany. Genevieve and James produce the tale for the people of Paramithi with great dancing, music, costumes and props. The show fits like a glove!	7 December 2008
16	The Ugly Duckling	Every day is special in the Kingdom of Paramithi! The King and Queen present the Medal of Paramithi to Madeleine for practicing her Irish dancing every day, and then they are entertained by the Paramithi Dance Troupe, who performs ballet. Once their duties are completed, the King and Queen are free to do as they please, so they read a story in the Paramithi Storybook. It is The Ugly Duckling, a story written by Hans Christian Andersen in the 1840s. After reading the story, James and Genevieve set out to produce a show of the tale. Bobby plays the ugly duckling while Sarah performs as the mother duck. The show is certainly all it's 'quacked' up to be!	8 December 2008
17	Sinbad the Sailor	The King and Queen of Paramithi join James and Genevieve and present the Medal of Paramithi to Jade for jumping every day! The Marching Soldiers give a grand performance, before the King and Queen go to the royal library to see the clues for the tale that's in the Paramithi Storybook. They find a lion's mask, jewellery and a turban. It is Sinbad the Sailor, a tale of ancient Middle Eastern origin. After a fun reading and act of the tale, costumes and props are made and a cast is found to perform in the Paramithi theatre. The show goes 'sailingly' well!	9 December 2008
18	Little Red Riding Hood	The King and Queen present the Medal of Paramithi to young Christobel for practicing her violin every day. Next the King and Queen go to the royal library to see the clues for the tale that's in the Paramithi Storybook. There's a basket of treats, a shawl, a jacket and a hood. It is Little Red Riding Hood, which was made popular in France by Charles Perrault in 1697. After reading the tale, the King thinks it would be better performed in front of an audience, so James and Genevieve set out to produce the show. The show is a h‐o‐o‐o‐o‐owling success!	10 December 2008
19	Puss in Boots	It's time to present the Medal of Paramithi and today it goes to Felix for brushing his hair every day! Next it's time for the Marching Soldiers to perform, before the King and Queen go to find today's story in the Paramithi Storybook. It is Puss in Boots, which was made popular in France by Charles Perrault in the 17th century. The Queen reads the story while Genevieve and James act it out, then it's time to produce the tale as a performance for the people of Paramithi. Sarah plays Puss in Boots, while Carlos plays the ogre and Bobby plays the king. The show is purrrrrrrfect!	11 December 2008
20	Swan Lake	Every day is special in the Kingdom of Paramithi! Anastasia sings a special song before the King and Queen present the Medal of Paramithi to Jade for dancing every day. Then the General from the Marching Soldiers performs a song, before the King and Queen adjourn to the royal library to see what is in the Paramithi Storybook. It is Swan Lake, a tale that originated in Europe many years ago. At the King and Queen's request, Genevieve and James turn the story into a beautiful performance. The show is gracefully great!	12 December 2008
21	Mrs Fox's Wedding	The King and Queen present the Medal of Paramithi to Gabrielle, who helps her family by weeding the garden. The Paramithi Dance Troupe performs ballet then James suggests that the King and Queen go to the library to see what story is in the Paramithi Storybook. They find that it is Mrs Fox's Wedding. The King suggests that James and Genevieve produce the story as a show, so Genevieve begins with the costumes and props, while James looks for a cast. But James finds that he is missing someone to play one of the suitors. Luckily the King decides to step in and help them out and performs as a lion. Mrs Fox's Wedding gets a great reception! Then King John takes Queen Isabella's hand and they dance together in the royal throne room.	13 December 2008
22	The Little Mermaid	The King sings a special regal song before it's time go to the royal library to see the clues for the tale that's in the Paramithi Storybook. They find a bowl of water, a mermaid and a prince's cap. The story is The Little Mermaid, a very popular story by the Danish poet and author Hans Christian Andersen. After reading the story, James and Genevieve set out to produce a show of the tale. Sarah performs as the mermaid, Bobby is the handsome prince and Bernadette plays the sea witch. The show goes 'swimmingly'!	14 December 2008
23	The Emperor's New Clothes	The King and Queen of Paramithi join James and Genevieve and present the Medal of Paramithi to Joshua for taking out the rubbish! King John and Queen Isabella adjourn to the royal library to find out what today's story is inside the Paramithi Storybook. It is The Emperor's New Clothes, a story by the famous Hans Christian Andersen. After a fun reading and act of the tale, costumes and props are made and a cast is found to perform in the Paramithi theatre! Carlos and Bernadette play the rogues, while Bobby plays the Emperor. It's an 'emperor‐essive' performance!	15 December 2008
24	Sleeping Beauty	James is helping the Paramithi cook find some new dessert ideas, and to help him remember them he turns the recipe into a poem! The Medal of Paramithi is presented to Alang for packing all her toys away, before James suggests that the King and Queen take a walk to the royal library to see what story is inside the Paramithi Storybook. It is Sleeping Beauty, a tale made popular by French author Charles Perrault in the 17th century. Genevieve and James set out to produce it as a musical performance for the people of Paramithi. James finds that he is missing someone to play the old man for the show, but luckily the King steps in and helps them out. The show is a real...beauty!	16 December 2008
25	Snow White	The King and Queen present the Medal of Paramithi to Joshua for brushing his teeth both morning and night! Then the Marching Soldiers have a special performance. Once their royal duties are completed, the King and Queen go to see what is in the Paramithi Storybook. It is Snow White, a story that originated in Europe during the Middle Ages. King John thinks the story would be better performed in front of an audience, so James and Genevieve set out to produce the show. Bernadette plays Snow White, Bobby plays the prince and Sarah plays the evil stepmother. The show about Snow White who eats the poisoned apple...is a juicy tale!	17 December 2008
26	The Singing Shell	The Medal of Paramithi is presented to Gabrielle today for practicing her spelling. The King and Queen are entertained by the Paramithi Dance Troupe who performs the can-can! Then it's off to the royal library to discover what story lies in the Paramithi Storybook today. It is The Singing Shell! The King suggests that Genevieve and James organise a performance of the tale in the Paramithi theatre with music, dancing and singing. Sarah performs as the mermaid and Bernadette plays the fisherman. The performance really hits the right note! Then King John and Queen Isabella try a dance of their own.	18 December 2008
27	Rumpelstiltskin	The King and Queen present the Medal of Paramithi to Rose for giving flowers to her mother everyday! Then they go to the royal library to see what clues are provided for the tale that's in the Paramithi Storybook. They find a reel of gold thread, some straw and a crown. It is Rumpelstiltskin, a well‐known tale that originated in Germany many centuries ago. After reading the story, James and Genevieve set out to produce a show of the tale. Sarah performs as the miller's daughter, Bobby is the king, and Carlos plays Rumpelstiltskin. Rumpelstiltskin's story is about a lady who can spin straw into gold and it certainly ends up as a golden performance!	19 December 2008
28	Rapunzel	Every day is special in the Kingdom of Paramithi! The King and Queen of Paramithi are entertained by the Paramithi Dance Troupe who performs ballet. Then they go to the library to see the clues for the tale that's in the Paramithi Storybook. They find a long haired wig, a bowl of rampion salad and a thorny branch. It is Rapunzel, a story that originated many years ago in Germany. After a fun reading and act of the tale, costumes and props are made and a cast is found to perform in the Paramithi Theatre. Sarah takes the lead role as Rapunzel, Bernadette plays the enchantress and Bobby is the prince. It's a hair‐raising adventure!	20 December 2008
29	The Snow Queen	The King and Queen present the Medal of Paramithi to Joshua, as he saved his pocket money! Then the General performs a special song. James suggests that King John and Queen Isabella stroll to the royal library in order to see what story is in the Paramithi Storybook today. It is The Snow Queen, a story by the well‐known Danish author Hans Christian Andersen. After reading the tale, the King thinks it would be better performed in front of an audience, so James and Genevieve set out to produce the show. Mario organises some icy‐cool costumes, while Johnny has the perfect props, and then it's on with the show. Bobby plays the hobgoblin and Bernadette plays the Snow Queen. Bernadette's performance is chillingly good!	21 December 2008
30	The Snow Man	King John and Queen Isabella present the very special Medal of Paramithi to Ading for tying her shoe laces all by herself! The Paramithi Dance Troupe performs a special ballet for the King and Queen, before it's off to the royal library to discover what story is in the Paramithi Storybook today. The clues to the story are a dog, a picture of a stove and a snowman. It is The Snow Man, a tale by the Danish‐born Hans Christian Andersen. At the King and Queen's request, Genevieve and James turn the story into a beautiful performance. Carlos plays the snowman and Bobby plays the dog. The performance of The Snow Man is...cool!	22 December 2008

== Music ==
Almost all of the songs featured in the series are adaptational parodies of musical numbers from many famous Gilbert and Sullivan comic operas, with the remaining exception of the soundtrack being derived from famous pieces of music of the classical period. An album would eventually be released in 2009, which included many of the songs from The Kingdom of Paramithi.

=== List of songs adapted from Gilbert and Sullivan ===
- The flowers that bloom in the spring (Originally taken from The Mikado. Used as the show's theme song and would also be featured as a musical number in episode 23. Listed on the album as "The Kingdom Of Paramithi").
- On a tree by a river (Originally taken from The Mikado. Used as the show's credits song and would also be featured as a musical number in episode 12 and episode 27. Listed on the album as "It's Goodbye").
- He is an Englishman (Originally taken from H.M.S Pinafore. A recurring song in the series featured in many episodes. Listed on the album as "Medal Presentation").
- Never mind the why and wherefore (Originally taken from H.M.S Pinafore. A recurring song in the series featured in many episodes. Listed on the album as "Now We Can Put On A Show").
- Dance a cachucha (Originally taken from The Gondoliers. A recurring song in the series featured in many episodes. Listed on the album as "Let's Get The Costumes").
- With cat-like tread, upon our prey we steal (Originally taken from The Pirates of Penzance. A recurring song in the series featured in many episodes. Listed on the album as "We Need A Cast").
- Hereupon we're both agreed (Originally taken from The Yeomen of the Guard. Featured as a musical number in episode 1 and episode 19. Listed on the album as "Tell A Tale Of Puss In Boots").
- If you want to know who we are (Originally taken from The Mikado. Featured as a musical number in episode 2. Listed on the album as "My Name Is Robin Hood").
- I am a courtier grave and serious (Originally taken from The Gondoliers. Featured as a musical number in episode 3 and episode 13. Listed on the album as "I Am A Green Frog").
- Here's a how-de-do (Originally taken from The Mikado. Featured as a musical number in episode 4 and episode 5. Listed on the album as "Here's A Magic Lamp").
- Oh, better far to live and die (Originally taken from The Pirates of Penzance. Featured as a musical number in episode 5 and episode 22. Listed on the album as "I'm Paramithi's King").
- Three little maids from school are we (Originally taken from The Mikado. Featured as a musical number in episode 6. Three versions of the song are listed on the album. Those being "Three Lovely Bowls", "Three Lovely Chairs" and "Three Lovely Beds").
- If you go in you're sure to win and Soon as we may, off and away (Originally taken from Iolanthe. Featured as a musical number in episode 7. Listed on the album as "Faint Heart Never Won The Treasure").
- I have a song to sing, O! (Originally taken from The Yeomen of the Guard. Featured as a musical number in episode 8. The version of the song on the album "We Prayed For The Sight Of The Navy" is soundtrack exclusive and is not featured in any episode of the series. However, it's possible that the album version of the song was originally also going to be included in episode 11).
- When a merry maiden marries (Originally taken from The Gondoliers. Featured as a musical number in episode 9 and episode 14. Listed on the album as "Let Me In, It's Cold And Raining").
- A magnet hung in a hardware shop (Originally taken from Patience. Featured as a musical number in episode 10 and episode 30. Listed on the album as "Pinocchio").
- I am the very model of a modern Major-General (Originally taken from The Pirates of Penzance. Featured as a musical number in episode 11, episode 20 and episode 29. Listed on the album as "I'm The Major General Of Paramithi").
- My gallant crew, good morning ... I am the Captain of the Pinafore (Originally taken from H.M.S Pinafore. Featured as a musical number in episode 11. Listed on the album as "I Am Captain Jeremiah").
- I'm called Little Buttercup (Originally taken from H.M.S Pinafore. Featured as a musical number in episode 12 and episode 22. This song is not included in the show's album).
- My eyes are fully open (Originally taken from Ruddigore. Featured as a musical number in episode 13. Listed on the album as "The Batter Song").
- Take a pair of sparkling eyes (Originally taken from The Gondoliers. Featured as a musical number in episode 14. This song is not included in the show's album).
- When I, good friends, was call'd to the Bar (Originally taken from Trial By Jury. Featured as a musical number in episode 15. Listed on the album as "So Now I'm A King").
- When first my old, old love I knew (Originally taken from Trial By Jury. Featured as a musical number in episode 16, episode 18 and episode 20. Listed on the album as "Anastasia's Song").
- When I was a lad (Originally taken from H.M.S Pinafore. Featured as a musical number in episode 17. This song is not included in the show's album).
- Poor wand'ring one (Originally taken from The Pirates of Penzance. Featured as a musical number in episode 20. Listed on the album as "Poor Lovely Swan").
- Kind sir, you cannot have the heart (Originally taken from The Gondoliers. Featured as a musical number in episode 25. This song is not included in the show's album).
- I've jibe and joke (Originally taken from The Yeomen of the Guard. Featured as a musical number in episode 26. This song is not included in the show's album).
- We sail the ocean blue (Originally taken from H.M.S Pinafore. The version of the song on the album "I Sail Across The Sea" is soundtrack exclusive and is not featured in any episode of the series. However, it's possible that the song was originally going to be included in episode 11).

=== List of songs adapted from other pieces of music ===
- Pachelbel's Canon (Originally composed by Johann Pachelbel. Featured as a musical number in episode 1 and episode 24. Listed on the album as "Cinderella's Song").
- Radetzky March (Originally composed by Johann Strauss Sr.. A recurring song in the series featured in many episodes. Listed on the album as "The Marching Soldiers Song").
- Humoresque No. 7 (Originally composed by Antonín Dvořák. Featured as an instrumental piece in episode 21 and a musical number in episode 29. This song is not included in the show's album).
- Galop Infernal (Originally composed by Jacques Offenbach. Featured as an instrumental piece in episode 26. This song is not included in the show's album).

== Home Media Releases ==
The Kingdom of Paramithi was released on DVD in 2009 by Roadshow Entertainment. Other DVDs released include All Time Favourite Fairytales (2009), Tales of Enchantment (2010) and Cinderella Pantomime, a live video special (2011).
