= Martin Havelka =

Czech actor (1958–2020)

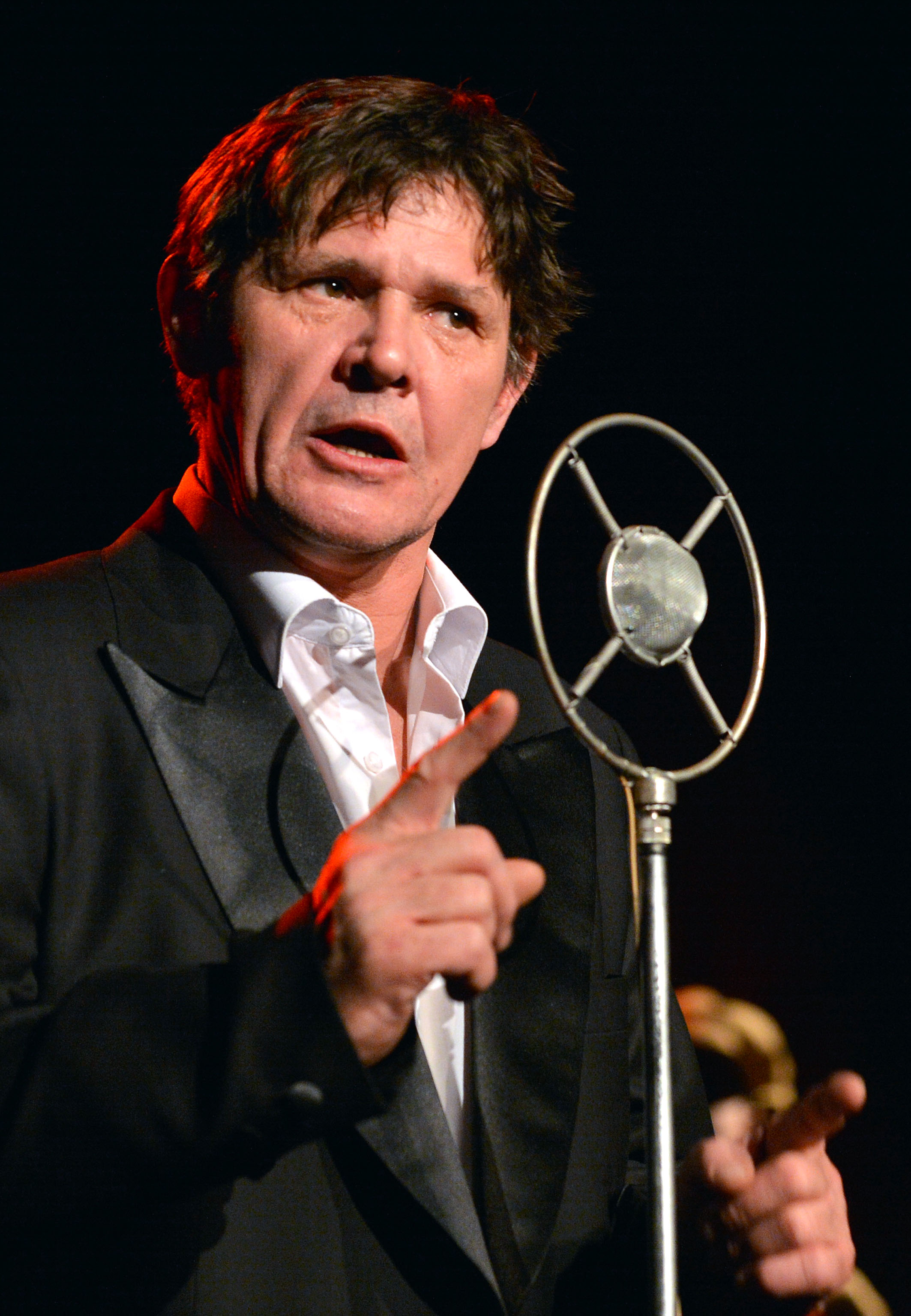
- Born: 10 July 1958; Karlovy Vary, Czechoslovakia
- Died: 2 October 2020 (aged 62); Brno, Czech Republic
- Occupation(s): Actor, dubber
- Years active: 1978–2020
- Spouse: Iva Havelková
- Children: 3

Martin Havelka (10 July 1958 – 2 October 2020) was a Czech actor and dubbing actor.

== Biography ==
Havelka was born in Karlovy Vary. At the start of his career he acted at the Divadlo Husa na provázku; then he acted at National Theatre Brno. He was a member of Brno City Theatre from 1999 until his death in 2020.

Havelka died on 2 October 2020, aged 62.

== Role at Brno City Theatre ==
- Truffaldino – Servant of Two Masters
- Cafourek – Škola základ života
- Lujko Zobar – Cikáni jdou do nebe
- Jindřich Hradský – My Fair Lady (ze Zelňáku)
- Kapitán četnictva – Koločava
- Pilát Pontský – Jesus Christ Superstar
- Asim – Balada o lásce (Singoalla)
- Darryl – The Witches of Eastwick
- Marian – Nahá múza
- Kůň – Le Dîner de Cons
- Georg Banks – Mary Poppins
- Orin – Little Shop of Horrors
- Petruccio – The Taming of the Shrew
