= Wiggly Waffle =

Children's television series

- Created by: Paul Field
- Starring: Anthony Field (2009–2013); Sam Moran (2009–2013); Murray Cook (2009-2013); Jeff Fatt (2009–2013)
- Country of origin: Australia
- No. of seasons: 5

Production
- Production company: The Wiggles Pty Ltd

Original release
- Network: PBS Kids Sprout (United States); ABC For Kids On 2/ABC4 Kids (Australia)
- Release: August 24, 2009 – March 22, 2013

Wiggly Waffle is a television program produced by The Wiggles Pty Ltd that aired in the United States on PBS Kids Sprout from August 24, 2009 to March 22, 2013.

Wiggly Waffle debuted in Australia on ABC2 on December 4, 2009, screening at 10:00am to 11:00am. This version lasted until March 5, 2010. The block aired on Sprout in the United States every weekday from 6:00-9:00 am.

== Hosts ==
The Wiggles are the host of the morning block. They tell jokes, sing songs and play games.

Viewers used to go on the website and send in videos for JB. The jukebox played during the show.

JB also introduces the "5th Wiggle" where viewers can sing and dance with The Wiggles.

== Programming ==
- Barney & Friends (United States only)
- Thomas & Friends (United States only)
- Play with Me Sesame (United States only)
- The Wiggles
- The Mighty Jungle (United States only)
- Roary the Racing Car (United States only)
- Monkey See, Monkey Do (United States only)
- Chloe's Closet (United States only)
- Rubbadubbers (United States only)
- Bob the Builder
- LazyTown (United States only)
- Baby Antonio's Circus (Australia only)
- Postman Pat (Australia only)
- Franny's Feet (Australia only)
- Zoo Mix (Australia only)
- Nanigugu (Australia only)
- Dorothy the Dinosaur (Australia only)
- The Kingdom of Paramithi (Australia only)
- The Adventures of Bottle Top Bill and His Best Friend Corky (Australia only)
