= Dempsey and Rowe =

American musical theater writing duo

Dempsey and Rowe refers to the duo of John Dempsey and Dana P. Rowe. They have written six musicals: The Reluctant Dragon, Zombie Prom (1996), The Fix (1997), The Witches of Eastwick (2000), Brother Russia (2012) and Blackbeard (2019).

== Joint works ==
Dempsey wrote the book and lyrics, while Rowe composed the music, for Zombie Prom (1995), The Fix (directed by Sam Mendes, 1997), and the stage adaptation of John Updike's The Witches of Eastwick (2000). Rowe and Dempsey were nominated for the Olivier Award for The Fix and The Witches of Eastwick, both of which were produced in London by Cameron Mackintosh. He was the co-lyricist for The Pirate Queen, collaborating with composer Claude-Michel Schönberg and lyricist Alain Boublil.

An original musical by Dempsey and Rowe, Brother Russia, in which a "fourth-rate Russian theatre troupe... in a desolate potato field north of Omsk" proves to be led by the seemingly immortal Rasputin, premiered between March 6 and April 15, 2012, by the Signature Theatre in Arlington, Virginia.

Dempsey and Rowe's musical Blackbeard opened on 18 June 2019 at the Signature Theatre, closing on 14 July. Inspired by the historical pirate, it follows Blackbeard's crew on a 'fantastical journey across the globe to raise an undead pirate army from the depths of the sea'.

== Musicals ==
=== The Fix (1997) ===
The Fix premiered at the Donmar Warehouse in April 1997 under the direction of Sam Mendes. Its working title was "Cal: A Musical Tale of Relative Insanity". After mixed critical reception, the material were rewritten and the tone made more comic. The revised version, featuring an expanded, bolder orchestration, premiered at the Signature Theatre, Arlington.

=== The Witches of Eastwick (2000) ===
Previewing from 24 June 2000 and opening on 18 July 2000 at the Theatre Royal Drury Lane, The Witches of Eastwick was based on John Updike's novel and its film adaptation. The original cast featured Ian McShane as Darryl Van Horne, with Lucie Arnaz, Maria Friedman and Joanna Riding as the witches. Eric D. Schaeffer, the director who 'fixed' previous show, The Fix, for its American premiere, was employed to head the production.

The Witches of Eastwick transferred to the Prince of Wales Theatre on 23 March 2001, where the set design was reconceived and a new song, "The Glory of Me" added in place of Van Horne's solo, "Who's the Man?". The production closed on the 27 October 2001. The Witches of Eastwick was also produced as the season-ending musical to the Signature Theatre's 2006-2007 season, starring Marc Kudisch, Emily Skinner, Jacquelyn Piro Donovan, and Christiane Noll.

=== Blackbeard (2019) ===
Dempsey and Rowe's musical Blackbeard opened on 18 June 2019 at the Signature Theatre, closing on 14 July. Inspired by the historical pirate, it follows Blackbeard's crew on a 'fantastical journey across the globe to raise an undead pirate army from the depths of the sea'.

== John Dempsey ==
John Dempsey is an American theatrical lyricist and playwright who has worked in Britain and the United States. His work has been produced in Japan, Brazil and other countries.

With playwright/lyricist Rinne Groff and composer Michael Friedman, Dempsey co-wrote the book and lyrics for the musical adaptation of the movie Saved!, which was produced by Playwrights Horizons in New York City in 2008.

== Dana P. Rowe ==
Dana P. Rowe is an American musical theater composer whose works have been performed internationally with productions in London's West End (Theatre Royal Drury Lane, Prince of Wales, The Donmar Warehouse), Russia, Czech Republic, Japan (including Tokyo's Imperial Garden Theatre), Germany, Australia, New York City, São Paulo, Brazil and Slovenia.

Rowe also composed the score for The Ballad of Bonnie and Clyde, a musical based on the famous bank-robbing couple, with book and lyrics by Michael Aman and Oscar E. Moore. The Ballad of Bonnie and Clyde was a featured production at the 2005 New York Musical Theatre Festival.

In 2011, he collaborated with Maribeth Graham on See Jane Run!, which had its premiere at the Actors' Playhouse in Miami.

He also provides coaching for artists on his website in an attempt to "help performers, writers, coaches, and creative artists worldwide achieve greater career success..." pointing out that there are "over 340,000 performing artists in the US alone" with the majority receiving poor salaries.
