= Eric D. Schaeffer =

American theatre director, producer

- Born: United States
- Occupations: Theater director, producer

Eric D. Schaeffer is an American theater director and producer based in Arlington County, Virginia.

He is the co-founder and former Artistic Director of Signature Theatre., and is well known nationally for his re-invention of large American musicals for small black box venues. He has produced many of the works of Stephen Sondheim, stating that the Signature production of Sweeney Todd in the 1990–1991 season "put us on the map". Under his leadership, Signature Theatre was chosen to receive the 2009 Regional Theatre Tony Award.

Over its first 21 years, Schaeffer led the Theatre to 70 Helen Hayes Awards and 283 Helen Hayes nominations for outstanding excellence in the theater. He created The American Musical Voices Project and The American Musical Voices Project: The Next Generation, which has awarded over $500,000 in commissions to writers for new American musicals. He has directed on Broadway, West End in London, Los Angeles, and Chicago, and served as the artistic director of The Sondheim Celebration at The Kennedy Center in 2002.

Schaeffer is a graduate of Kutztown University of Pennsylvania. In 2012, he was awarded an honorary degree, a Doctor of Humane Letters, from his alma mater.

On June 24, 2020, Schaeffer stepped down as artistic director of Signature Theatre amid accusations of sexual assault. An investigation by a lawyer hired by the Signature board found the allegations to be “not credible.” However, an article published contemporaneously by DCist documented multiple allegations of sexual misconduct.

== Selected directing credits ==
Signature Theatre

Sunset Boulevard, Chess, Kiss of the Spider Woman, Glory Days, Merrily We Roll Along, The Witches of Eastwick, Saving Aimee, Into the Woods, My Fair Lady, Nevermore, Assassins, The Highest Yellow, One Red Flower, Allegro, Twentieth Century, 110 in the Shade, Hedwig and the Angry Inch, The Gospel According to Fishman, Grand Hotel, The Rhythm Club, Over & Over, The Fix, Working, The Rink, Cabaret, First Lady Suite, Wings, Poor Superman, Unidentified Human Remains and the True Nature of Love, Passion, Company, Sweeney Todd, Follies, Pacific Overtures, Ace, Les Misérables and Showboat.

Broadway

- Gigi (2015) [transfer from the Kennedy Center]
- Million Dollar Quartet (2010)
- Glory Days (2008)
- Putting It Together (1999)
- Follies (2011) [transfer from the Kennedy Center]

National Tours

- Big
- Barbie Live in Fairytopia

Off-Broadway

- Sweet Adeline (1997, Encores!)
- Under the Bridge

London

- The Witches of Eastwick (2000, World premiere, Theatre Royal, Drury Lane and Prince of Wales Theatre)

Kennedy Center

- Gigi (2015)
- Follies (2011)
- Passion (2002)

Awards

- 2002 Washingtonian of the Year
- 6 Helen Hayes Awards (Outstanding Direction)
- 6 Helen Hayes Awards (Outstanding Musical)
- 2007 Arts Founder Award
