= Stanislav Moša =

Czech theatre and musical director

Stanislav Moša (born 12 February 1956 in Nový Jičín) is a Czech theatre and musical director, manager, lyricist and librettist. Since 1992, he has been the artistic director and manager of the Brno City Theatre.

He studied in Ostrava and in Brno at JAMU. He directed over 120 productions abroad as well as in the Czech Republic (as of 2008).

== Drama directing ==
- Romeo and Juliet
- The Good Soldier Švejk
- Manon Lescaut

== Musical directing ==
- West Side Story
- Jesus Christ Superstar
- Joseph and the Amazing Technicolor Dreamcoat
- The Witches of Eastwick (musical)
- My Fair Lady
- Les Misérables (musical) (in Zagreb, Komedija Theatre)
