= Zombie Prom =

Off-broadway Musical

- Music: Dana P. Rowe
- Lyrics: John Dempsey
- Book: John Dempsey
- Productions: 1993 Key West; 1996 Off-Broadway; 2009 Off-West End

Zombie Prom is an Off-Broadway musical with music by Dana P. Rowe and a book and lyrics by John Dempsey, later adapted into a short film. It was first produced at the Red Barn Theatre, Key West, Florida in 1993. It opened off-Broadway in New York City at the Variety Arts Theatre in 1996. It also opened November 2009 in London with a UK Premiere at the Off-West End Landor Theatre.

== Story ==
=== Act I ===
Zombie Prom is set at Enrico Fermi High School, a school located near a very unstable nuclear power plant. The students and staff go through their daily routine ("Enrico Fermi High"); among them is Jonny, a rebel who spells his name without the traditional 'H', the good-girl heroine, Toffee, and Miss Strict, the principal of Enrico Fermi High School. The day is interrupted by an air raid siren, signalling a duck-and-cover drill. Jonny and Toffee meet and fall in love ("Ain't No Goin' Back"). They date for several months before Toffee's parents forbid her from seeing Jonny. She reluctantly breaks up with him, and Jonny commits suicide by hurling himself into the Francis Gary Powers nuclear power plant, causing a "class 3 nuclear disaster". He is buried at sea in international waters, with the rest of the nuclear waste.

Three weeks pass. Toffee's friends notice that she is upset and distracted. She expresses sadness over Jonny's death, and retells the night from her point of view ("Jonny Don't Go").

As the rest of the school gets ready for the senior prom, Toffee continues to wearing black to Jonny ("Good As It Gets"). Her friends insist that she should go to prom and get over Jonny's death, but she refuses. She also occasionally hears Jonny's voice ("The C Word"). Frustrated at constantly being told to get over Jonny, she states that "life's a trap of the same old crap." 'Crap,' however, is a taboo word at Enrico Fermi High; Toffee's friend Ginger tells on her to Miss Strict, and Miss Strict reminds her of the school's philosophy, something the students are very familiar with ("Rules, Regulations, and Respect").

Toffee continues to hear Jonny's voice, eventually hearing it coming from inside her locker. He begs to be let free and bursts from the locker, shocking the other students ("Blast From The Past"). This is not well-received, and the students are scared and disgusted by Jonny's deteriorating appearance. Not to miss out on a story, reporter Eddie Flagrante picks up on the story from Josh, a cub reporter from Enrico Fermi High ("That's the Beat For Me"). He elaborates on his job, and his goal in journalism: "Tamer than Playboy, but bigger than Life."

Trying to cope with Jonny's unexpected reappearance, Toffee talks with him about what brought him back - her voice, as it turns out ("The Voice in the Ocean"). Inspired to return to school, Jonny is ready to graduate ("It's Alive"). Miss Strict, however, adamantly refuses to allow him to re-enroll and bans him from school, despite Jonny's new appreciation for Miss Strict and her ideals.

Overwhelmed, Toffee struggles to decide what to do next. Her friends urge her to give up on Jonny and move on, while Jonny's friends encourage him to do the same to her, as they believe Toffee has made her answer clear by not immediately taking him back. Jonny pleads with Toffee to get back together with him, unsuccessfully ("Where Do We Go From Here?"). Josh points Jonny out to a visiting Flagrante, who recognizes Miss Strict. He states that it has been "a very long time" and the two have a cryptic conversation, in which Miss Strict is defensive and angry for an unknown reason. The three then begin to argue over Jonny's rights; Flagrante believes Jonny should be allowed to return and preventing him from doing so is an infringement on his civil rights, while Miss Strict believes the school rules should be enforced and breaking tradition even once is too dangerous to risk, especially for a student as unremarkable as Jonny (who genuinely just wants to return to school). Neither side gives in, and the argument ends in a stalemate ("Trio [Case Closed]").

=== Act II ===
The students at Enrico Fermi High school protest that Jonny should be let back into school ("Then Came Jonny"). Miss Strict retaliates by canceling the pep squad; not slowed by her tactics, they begin to disobey the dress code. Miss Strict dismantles the baseball team, but even so, the students make a petition to reinstate Jonny as a student. Miss Strict puts all seniors on probation, threatens to cancel all after-school events, and promises that at the next transgression, she can and will cancel the senior prom.

Flagrante has continued to report on Jonny's story on television ("Come Join Us"). During a commercial break, he asks for the number to Our Lady of Divine Masochism, a Catholic orphanage, for unspecified reasons. While being interviewed by Flagrante, Jonny explains that he cannot give up love because it is what brought him back ("How Can I Say Good-Bye?").

Meanwhile, Toffee cannot focus on her schoolwork. She debates with herself if she should take back Jonny. Her friends call on a party line and talk with her about her situation. None of them missed Jonny's TV appearance, which was broadcast on "all three channels". In the end, Toffee chooses to take Jonny back ("Easy to Say").

Flagrante tracks down Miss Strict and begins flirting with her ("Exposé"). It is revealed that they were lovers in high school, with a very physical relationship - the last time they were together, Miss Strict reminds him, was in the back seat of his father's Studebaker. Each feels that the other had abandoned them, without revealing specifics.

Prom night arrives, and the students marvel at how the school has been decorated ("Isn't It?"). Toffee approaches Jonny, who has snuck into the prom, and tells him that she will always be with him. They dance and continue to profess their love for each other ("Forbidden Love"). However, Jonny is then caught by Miss Strict, who stops everything to kick him out. Before she can do so, Eddie Flagrante appears in order to confront Miss Strict about her secrets and her hostility towards Jonny, but she refuses to explain herself ("The Lid's Been Blown"). Pushed by Flagrante, Miss Strict reveals her past ("Delilah's Confession"); despite her mother's warnings, she had been dating "a boy from the wrong side of the tracks" - Flagrante. On the evening of her own prom, she and Flagrante drove around before stopping off an old highway and slept together, resulting in Miss Strict becoming pregnant. Once her parents found out, she was sent to a home for unwed mothers in Santa Fe, New Mexico to give birth. Her son was taken away to an orphanage, and Miss Strict was never able to identify the child. Flagrante, who had investigated the orphanage, reveals that Jonny is their long-lost son and proposes to Miss Strict. Overjoyed, Miss Strict allows the prom to continue and permits Jonny to return to school. The students reflect on how their realities are so different from their dreams, but life remains worth living, and Toffee and Jonny have one more dance before the curtain drops ("Zombie Prom").

== Characters ==
- Jonny Warner: a "bad boy" who becomes romantically involved with Toffee, his classmate. After Toffee breaks up with him under the orders of her disapproving parents, he commits suicide by jumping into a nuclear reactor and is buried at sea with the rest of the nuclear waste generated by the disaster his death caused. He then comes back from the dead as a zombie, due to the nuclear waste he was buried with, and sets out to return to school and win Toffee back. It is revealed at the end of the musical that he is Miss Strict and Eddie Flagrante's son.
- Toffee: Jonny's girlfriend. After his death, she is riddled with guilt, and becomes even more conflicted when he is revived. Eventually, she chooses him, even though it is the less safe thing to do.
- Delilah Strict: the principal of Enrico Fermi High School, the school Jonny and Toffee attend. True to her name, she is extremely harsh and rigidly adheres to rules and tradition. This is later revealed to be due to her teenage pregnancy (which resulted in Jonny's birth).
- Eddie Flagrante: An investigative reporter for Exposé Magazine. Very determined and inquisitive, he takes a strong interest in Jonny and his death and subsequent revival and discovers that Jonny is his son, conceived with his high-school girlfriend, Miss Strict.
- Jake, Joey, and Josh: Jonny's friends, who berate Toffee for not wanting to take Jonny back. While Jake and Joey don't have much characterization (besides Jake's flirtatious comments towards Coco and Toffee), Josh is an amateur reporter for the Enrico Fermi High Gazette, and brings the stories from the high school - notably that of Jonny's death and zombification - to Exposé Magazine.
- Candy, Ginger, and Coco: Toffee's friends, who generally encourage Toffee not to take Jonny back. Candy is characterized by her anxiety and her declaration that she is "hanging on by her fingernails!" Ginger is a good girl who often speaks up in favor of the rules and social norms of the school, and Coco makes several promiscuous comments throughout the course of the show.

== Musical numbers ==
Act I

- "Enrico Fermi High" - Toffee, Jonny, Coco, Kids and Miss Strict
- "Ain't No Goin' Back" - Toffee, Jonny and Kids
- "Jonny Don't Go" - Toffee and Girls
- "Good As it Gets" - Toffee and Kids
- "The C Word" - Toffee, Jonny, Ginger, Coco, Candy, Jake, Joey, Josh
- "Rules, Regulations and Respect" - Miss Strict and Kids
- "Blast From The Past" - Jonny and Kids
- "That's The Beat For Me" - Eddie, Josh, Secretaries and Copy Boys
- "The Voice In The Ocean" - Jonny and Toffee
- "It's Alive" - Jonny, Miss Strict and Kids
- "Where Do We Go From Here?" - Jonny, Toffee and Kids
- "Trio (Case Closed)" - Eddie, Miss Strict and Jonny

Act II

- "Then Came Jonny" - Miss Strict, Jonny, Toffee and Kids
- "Come Join Us" - Ramona Merengue, Eddie and Jonny
- "How Can I Say Good-Bye?" - Jonny and Motorwise Guys
- "Easy To Say" - Toffee and Girls
- "Exposé" - Eddie and Miss Strict
- "Isn't It?" - Kids
- "Forbidden Love" - Toffee, Jonny and Kids
- "The Lid's Been Blown" - Eddie, Miss Strict and Kids
- "Delilah's Confession" - Miss Strict
- "Zombie Prom" - Full Company

== Off-Broadway cast ==
The cast of the 1996 Off-Broadway Production was as follows:
Eddie Flagrante – Richard Muenz
Delilah Strict – Karen Murphey
Jonny Warner – Richard Roland
Toffee – Jessica-Snow Wilson
Coco – Cathy Trien
Ginger – Natalie Toro
Candy – Rebecca Rich
Joey – Marc Lovci
Jake – Stephen Bienskie
Josh – Jeff Skowron
Swings – Ronit Mitzner, DJ Salisbury

== Critical reception ==
Reviews of the original Off-Broadway production were generally mixed to negative, with critics praising the cast and the show's humor while also criticizing the book. In his review for The New York Times, critic Ben Brantley wrote:

"Zombie Prom, ... is itself like a model high school student: it's genial and hard working, and it doesn't embarrass you. But for a musical whose hero is a gangrenous corpse, it is also exceptionally bland. ... [the show] relies heavily on this sort of straight-faced pairing of Eisenhower-era perkiness with the nuclear nightmare sensibility of horror movies of the same time. It is essentially a one-joke show, very much in need of more bite than the director Philip William McKinley seems willing to give it, that would have worked better as an extended sketch in a revue."

Greg Evans, in his review for Variety praised the performances from the cast, but compared the show unfavorably to Grease and Little Shop of Horrors, writing "Lacking the spark of the former or bite of the latter, “Zombie Prom” is like any old human prom, a lot of fuss for a very little fun."

== Adaptations ==
=== 2006 short film ===
A short film adaptation of Zombie Prom (with a running time of only 36 minutes) was released in 2006 at a number of film festivals, receiving a 4-star review on Film Threat and awards including Best Short Film at the Palm Beach International Film Festival. The cast includes drag queen RuPaul as Principal Strict. The film was directed by Vince Marcello.

=== Feature film ===
In June 2015, Variety reported that a feature film adaptation was in production with Vince Marcello and Mark Landry writing the screenplay, and Marcello directing. As of 2025, no new information has surfaced about the film.
