= Sarah Lark =

British actress

- Born: Sarah Lark; 28 January 1983 (age 43); Roath, Cardiff, Wales
- Other name: Sarah de la Bédoyère
- Occupations: Actress, singer
- Years active: 1995–present
- Spouse: Hugh de la Bédoyère
- Children: Nell de la Bédoyère (born 2016), James de la Bédoyère (born 2020)

Sarah Lark (born 28 January 1983) is a Welsh singer and actress who rose to fame when she competed as one of the finalists in the BBC talent show-themed television series I'd Do Anything in 2008.

== Background ==
Lark was born in Roath, Cardiff to Bev and Billy Lark, and began performing at an early age. When she was twelve years old she played the lead role in the Starstruck Theatre production of musical, Annie at St Peter's Church Hall in Roath alongside Charlotte Church, who took the role of Molly. She appeared in the television series The Biz and The Healer and appeared in the original performance of the Andrew Lloyd Webber musical, Whistle Down The Wind at the Sydmonton Festival held at Lloyd Webber's country house, Sydmonton Court in 1995 as part of the ensemble.

In 2000 Lark made her West End debut creating the role of "Little Girl" in Cameron Mackintosh's production of The Witches of Eastwick at the Theatre Royal, Drury Lane. In 2003 she played John Barrowman's daughter in the musical, Beautiful and Damned at the Yvonne Arnaud Theatre in Guildford, Surrey.

After appearing as Lucy in a production of Snoopy!!! The Musical at the Jermyn Street Theatre in 2003, Lark undertook a Post-Graduate course in Musical theatre at the Royal Academy of Music. Here in 2004 she played the roles of Julie in Victoria Wood's play Talent and also Hermia in A Midsummer Night's Dream. She graduated with a distinction and then went on to reprise her role in Snoopy!!! at The New Players' Theatre in 2004. In 2005 she joined the musical Mamma Mia! at the Prince of Wales Theatre, as cover for the roles of Lisa and Sophie.

She stayed in Mamma Mia! for two years before making her first appearance at the Edinburgh Fringe Festival in 2007, performing in C Theatre's productions of Cinderella, in the title role and the annual Shakespeare For Breakfast, as Juliet's nurse. The latter making a successful transfer to the Canal Cafe Theatre in Little Venice, London.

== I'd Do Anything ==
Lark was a finalist on I'd Do Anything on BBC One from March to May 2008, a show which searched for a new, unknown lead to play Nancy in a West End revival of the British musical Oliver!. She was eliminated in show six on 4 May.

Immediately after the show Lark participated in the I'd Do Anything tours with fellow contestants Ashley Russell, Keisha Amponsa-Banson and Niamh Perry, along with Michael French and Connie Fisher, accompanied by the BBC Singers and the BBC Symphony Orchestra.

== Further career ==
After participating in a workshop production at the Menier Chocolate Factory in the London Borough of Southwark, Lark performed as Collette in Conor Mitchell's Mathilde at the 2008 Edinburgh Comedy Festival, directed by Simon Callow. In September 2008 she performed as the lead female vocalist in the show Hits of the West End at the Hamilton Townhouse, Hamilton, South Lanarkshire.

On 14 October, she appeared in a one-off charity performance of the musical comedy Betwixt! at the Ambassadors Theatre in Covent Garden, London. On 9 November 2008 she performed a solo cabaret act An afternoon with Sarah Lark, at Lauderdale House in Waterlow Park, Highgate in north London.

In February 2009, Lark performed at the 2009 Whatsonstage Theatregoers' Choice Award at the Prince of Wales Theatre in London. She sang "9 to 5" with fellow I'd do Anything contestant Samantha Barks and X-Factor finalist Niki Evans, then the title track from the Broadway musical Xanadu.

In November 2009, Lark performed at an all-star concert celebrating the work of young British composer Michael Bruce at the Apollo Theatre. Other performers to feature in the concert included West End Stars Julie Atherton, Paul Spicer and Leanne Jones, Eurovision: Your Country Needs You finalist Mark Evans, Any Dream Will Do finalist Daniel Boys, and How Do You Solve A Problem Like Maria? finalist Helena Blackman.

Also in 2009, Lark recorded the lead role of Roberta Jones in Gareth Peter Dicks' musical Bluebird, a Second World War musical concept recording that also starred Ramin Karimloo and Abi Finley.

=== Oliver! ===
After appearing on I'd do Anything Lark's next major show was as the Strawberry seller in Cameron Mackintosh's revival production of Oliver! at the Theatre Royal, Drury Lane, London. She understudied the part of Nancy, performing it on a few occasions during the absence of winner Jodie Prenger, performing opposite Rowan Atkinson, Omid Djalili and Griff Rhys Jones as Fagin, and Burn Gorman and Steven Hartley as Bill Sykes. Lark departed the cast on 27 March 2010 after performing in the production for 14 months.

=== Pantomime ===
Lark has appeared twice as Snow White in Pantomimes for UK Productions. She has also appeared as Fairy Formidable in Beauty and the Beast.

=== The Best Little Whorehouse in Texas ===
Lark played the lead role of Miss Mona in a major revival of The Best Little Whorehouse in Texas at the Union Theatre, London.

=== What the World Needs Now – The Music of Burt Bacharach ===
In February 2012, Lark appeared as a special guest vocalist at a Valentine's Day concert of the music of Burt Bacharach, alongside Cat Simmons and the Royal Philharmonic Orchestra. The concert programme was recorded as an album with the RPO and performed several more times around the UK, including a special performance with the BBC Concert Orchestra for BBC Radio 2's Friday Night is Music Night broadcast live from the Mermaid Theatre in London, presented by Paul Gambaccini.

=== Les Misérables ===
From June 2012 to July 2015, Lark appeared in the musical Les Misérables at the Queen's Theatre in London.

She returned to the production in 2017 and remained with the show until its final performance at the Queen's Theatre on Saturday 13 July 2019.

She performed as part of a special concert performance of the musical featuring Michael Ball, Alfie Boe and Carrie Hope Fletcher at the Gielgud Theatre in 2019.

She opened the new production of Les Misérables at the newly refurbished and renamed Sondheim Theatre in 2019 as the show’s Dance Captain.

== Discography ==
- The Witches of Eastwick – Original cast recording, as Little Girl (2000).
- Oliver! – Live cast recording, as Strawberry Seller (2009).
- Bluebird – Original concept cast recording, as Roberta (2009).
- Les Miserables - the staged concert (2019)
