= Glory Days (musical) =

2008 musical by Nick Blaemire and James Gardiner

- Original poster
- Music: Nick Blaemire
- Lyrics: Nick Blaemire
- Book: James Gardiner
- Productions: 2008 Virginia; 2008 Broadway; 2009 Tokyo; 2011 Los Angeles; 2021 Tokyo

Glory Days is a musical with music and lyrics by Nick Blaemire and a book by James Gardiner about four high school friends reuniting a year after graduation. The musical opened at the Signature Theatre in 2008 and was then produced on Broadway in 2008 but closed after one regular performance. Since 2008, it has had over 50 productions mounted around the world.

== Productions ==
The musical premiered at the Signature Theatre, a professional regional theatre in Arlington, Virginia, from January 15 through February 17, 2008, where it was directed by Eric D. Schaeffer, the artistic director of the theatre, with musical staging by assistant director Matthew Gardiner. Musical accompaniment consisted of a four-piece band. The show earned generally good notices at the Signature Theatre, including a rave review from The Washington Post.

Glory Days began previews on Broadway at the Circle in the Square Theatre on April 22, 2008, with an official opening on May 6, 2008. Schaeffer again directed, and the Broadway production featured the same actors who starred in the Signature Theatre production. The Broadway engagement was produced by John O'Boyle, Ricky Stevens, Richard E. Leopold and Lizzie Leopold, and Max Productions in association with Signature Theatre. The production featured sets by James Kronzer, costumes by Sasha Ludwig-Siegel and lighting by Mark Lanks.

The musical closed on May 6, 2008, after only 17 previews and one official performance on Broadway. The producers cited "low advance sales" in announcing the show's closing.

In June 2010, licensing house Playscripts, Inc. published Glory Days. It is now available to be licensed through Broadway Licensing.

In 2009, Takahiro Nishijima, a.k.a. Nissy, lead singer of the Tokyo band Attack All Around, appeared in the international premiere in Tokyo, Japan. In 2021,Glory Days returned to Tokyo for a brand new production. Since 2008, the musical has been in Tokyo, London, Sydney, Los Angeles, San Francisco, Chicago, Boston, Philadelphia and several other cities across the United States. Sarah Taylor Ellis, writing for Stage and Cinema, noted that "the flop wasn’t really a flop after all" about the 2011 Los Angeles production starring Derek Klena.

== Background ==
The summer after their freshman year of college, actor-songwriter Nick Blaemire, who would go on to make his broadway debut in the same season Glory Days premiered, in Cry-Baby (musical), approached his high school friend, James Gardiner (both grew up near Washington, D.C.), also an actor, with an idea for an original new musical. Gardiner joined in the project after hearing Blaemire's song "Open Road". After working on the show for about two years, the two brought the show to Eric Schaeffer, the artistic director of the Signature Theatre, who agreed to produce the musical. The show is performed in one act of 90 minutes.

Peter Marks, in his Washington Post review of the Signature Theatre production, wrote that it is a "fresh and vivacious one-act musical... real and surprisingly moving.... The buoyant product of the talented young team..., Glory Days swiftly, tunefully and yes, authentically latches onto the rhythms of late adolescence and plays them back to us as the music of wrenching transitions."

James Howard, in his BroadwayWorld review wrote "It's about that elusive thing – real emotion between grown men. Perhaps that is the greatest glory of this terrific new musical."

== Synopsis ==
Four high school friends meet one night, a year after graduation, on the high school football field's bleachers. Will introduces the background of the four friends ("My Three Best Friends"). Will has invited the three of his friends, Andy (Will's college roommate), Skip (who went to an Ivy league school), and Jack (similarly separated from Will, Andy, and Skip, though where is not specified) to meet with him. As the friends arrive ("Are You Ready For Tonight?"), Will begins to catch up with his friends and in the process gets caught up in a traditional match of male-bonding/one-upsmanship with Andy over their College sexual exploits ("We've Got Girls"). Will also mentions the purpose of the midnight meeting: to play a prank on the friends' high school rivals/oppressors/classmates, and though all four are not right off the bat on board for the prank Will manages to convince them ("Right Here").

The first plot twist arrives when Jack reveals that he is gay ("Open Road"), after which Andy privately airs his misgivings and his feelings of betrayal to Will ("Things Are Different"), whereat Will convinces Andy to stay despite how uncomfortable Andy is being around Jack. Skip proceeds to expound on his recent intuitions about life and the generation to which the four friends belong ("Generation Apathy"). After hearing about how his friends have changed, Will sits back and reflects on the difference between the reality of the get together and what he assumed it would be like ("After All"). After reading Will's Journal, the four friends compare notes about high school and recount the "glory days" of the past ("The Good Old Glory Type Days"). Jack then takes Will aside to ask him about what he thinks about Jack's revelation, and asks Will what Will thinks Andy thinks, where Will betrays Andy's confidence and half-lies to Jack to cushion the blow of Andy's misgivings, going on to "explain" Andy to Jack ("The Thing About Andy").

Further complications arise in the direct aftermath of Will and Jack's conference when Jack expresses some feelings for Will whereupon he and Will are caught by Andy and Skip. An altercation brews when Andy interprets this as a further betrayal and explodes at Will, who is then defended by Jack (who unintentionally validates Andy's assumption). The argument grows more heated and more confusing as Skip leaps to Jack's defense and Will attempts to make peace between the four friends ("Forget About It"). During the argument Andy throws an angry epithet at Will, and Jack and Andy then vent their mutual feelings of betrayal and anger at a new level of emotional violence ("Other Human Beings") after which Jack departs. Skip then turns on Andy, who vents his ire, exposes the lies Will had told, and demands his due from the two remaining friends ("My Turn"), after which Andy storms off. Learning what truly happened from Will, Skip then talks Will into accepting his mistakes ("Boys"), and Skip leaves Will alone on the field. Will reexamines his life and decides to stop living in the past and move forward like his friends have ("My Next Story").

== Roles and original cast ==
- Will — Steven Booth
- Andy — Andrew C. Call
- Jack — Jesse JP Johnson
- Skip — Adam Halpin

Alex Brightman and Jeremy Woodard also featured in swing roles.

== Musical numbers ==
- "My Three Best Friends" – Will
- "Are You Ready for Tonight?" – All
- "We've Got Girls" – Will and Andy
- "Right Here" – All
- "Open Road" – Jack
- "Things Are Different" – Will and Andy
- "Generation Apathy" – Skip
- "After All" – Will
- "The Good Old Glory Type Days" – All
- "The Thing About Andy" - Will and Jack
- "Forget About It" - All
- "Other Human Beings" - Jack and Andy
- "My Turn" - Andy
- "Boys" - Will and Skip
- "My Next Story" - Will
