= Simon Pryce =

Australian musician

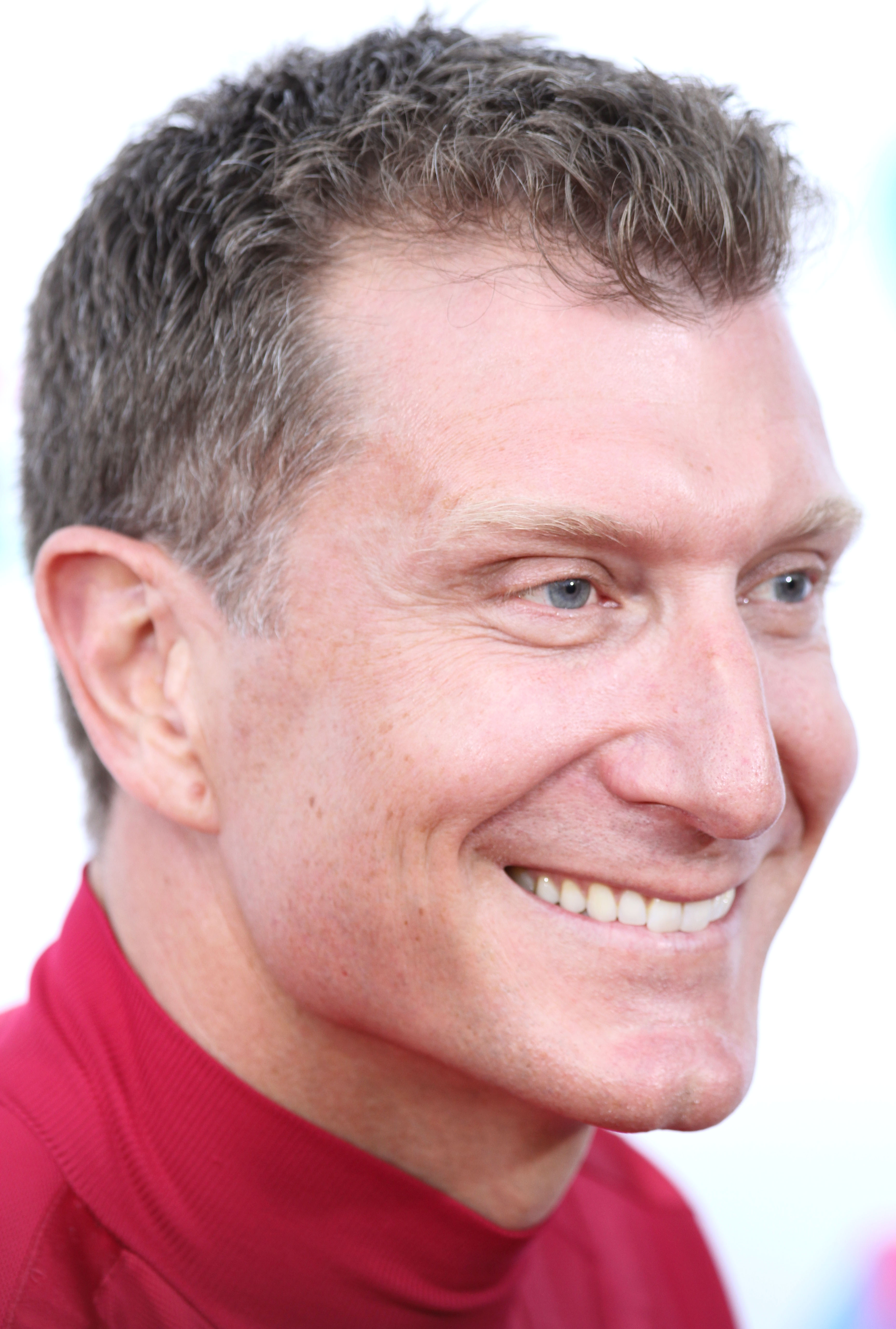
- Pryce at the 2014 ARIA Music Awards, Sydney, 26 November 2014

Background information
- Born: Simon James Pryce; Sydney, New South Wales, Australia
- Origin: Sydney, Australia
- Genres: Children's, musical theatre
- Occupations: Children's entertainer; singer; actor
- Instruments: Vocals; cowbell; bass; piano
- Years active: 1997–present
- Member of: The Wiggles
- Spouse: Lauren Hannaford (m. 2017)

Simon James Pryce is an Australian children's entertainer, singer and actor. He is best known for his work as the Red Wiggle of The Wiggles since 2013, and also for the children's show The Kingdom of Paramithi.

== Early life and education ==
Pryce, whose grandparents were opera singers, started performing at an early age. He studied drama at the University of Western Sydney.

== Career ==
=== Theatre ===
He has performed in several musicals, including Cats as Old Deuteronomy, Masterpiece: The Music of Andrew Lloyd Webber, Witches of Eastwick, Villain of Flowers, South Pacific, Fidelio with Opera Australia, and The Sunshine Club with the Sydney Theatre Company. He also played the title role in a 2007-09 Australian production of Phantom of the Opera over 100 times.

=== Television ===
Pryce has appeared in numerous TV shows and films, including Water Rats, All Saints, Home and Away and Hunt Angels. In July 2018, he appeared on Season 2 of Australian Ninja Warrior together with his personal trainer wife, Lauren Hannaford. In September 2020, Pryce was revealed to be the "Puppet" on The Masked Singer Australia, placing fourth on the second season of the show.

=== The Wiggles ===
Pryce joined the Wiggles organization in 2002, beginning as "one of their main voice artists" on several of their CDs. Pryce also portrayed a Gremlin in Whoo Hoo! Wiggly Gremlins! He joined their regular tour in 2009–10, as Ringo the Ringmaster and understudying for founding member Murray Cook. He also starred as King John in the Wiggles' production The Kingdom of Paramithi. In August 2012, Pryce was slated to replace Greg Page as the Yellow Wiggle. However, Page's departure was delayed until the end of that year, after Cook and Purple Wiggle Jeff Fatt decided to retire from the group then, asking Page to extend his stay until then so he would leave alongside them.

Pryce ultimately replaced Cook in early 2013.

In 2016, the Wiggles released The Carnival of the Animals, its narration was written and performed by Pryce. The album, based on the piece by the French Romantic composer Camille Saint-Saëns and performed by the Adelaide Symphony Orchestra, introduced children to classical music and instruments.

== Personal life ==
Pryce has described himself as "always into fitness and health", but that the Wiggles' performance schedule demanded an even higher level. In early 2016, he described his workout routine and the group's competitive culture of fitness, especially among its male members, to ex-rugby league footballer Adam MacDougall.

In late 2015, Pryce became engaged to ex-gymnast and fitness professional Lauren Hannaford who created online fitness program FHIT. They met four years earlier, when she toured with the Wiggles. Pryce and Hannaford were married in Sydney, in January 2017. The couple have a son, born in January 2021.
