= The Fix (musical) =

- Donmar Warehouse poster
- Music: Dana P. Rowe
- Lyrics: John Dempsey
- Book: John Dempsey
- Productions: 1997 West End; 1998, 2015 Arlington, Virginia; 2016 Off-West End

The Fix is a musical with book and lyrics by John Dempsey and music by Dana P. Rowe. It concerns the career of a fictional U.S. politician who gets mixed up with the Mafia.

It premiered at London's Donmar Warehouse in 1997.

== Production history ==
The Fix was developed in association with Cameron Mackintosh under the working title Cal: A Musical Tale of Relative Insanity.

In 1997, The Fix premiered at the Donmar Warehouse, in a production directed by Sam Mendes, with musical direction by Colin Welford. Running from 29 April through 14 June, the production starred John Barrowman, Kathryn Evans and Philip Quast, and featured a young John Partridge and Rebecca Front in ensemble roles. Barrowman and Quast were both nominated for the 1998 Olivier Award for Best Actor in a Musical for their roles, with Quast winning the award. The production was also nominated for Olivier Awards for Best New Musical and Best Lighting Designer (for Howard Harrison).

In 1998, a reworked version of The Fix made its US premiere at the Signature Theatre. The production was directed by Eric D. Schaeffer and ran from 17 March through 10 May.

In 2015, the Signature Theatre revived The Fix, with Schaeffer again directing. The production ran from 11 August through 20 September.

In 2016, a fringe production played at the Union Theatre in London from 13 July through 6 August.

On 9 August 2017, Feinstein's/54 Below presented a one-night concert production of The Fix.

== Plot ==
Act 1

Days before a United States presidential election, shoo-in candidate Reed Chandler suffers a fatal heart attack between the thighs of his mistress. Before the body has turned cold, the dead man's widow, Violet, and brother, Grahame (a speechwriter and spin doctor crippled from birth by polio and jealous of his brother's public success) - not keen to see their patience and preparation go to waste - are conspiring to replace him with his own son, an unambitious drifter, Calvin. Cal is enlisted in the army and married off to a perky debutante before developing a hard drug problem and being photographed during sex with his mistress, a nightclub singer named Tina McCoy. To cover up Cal's indiscretion, Grahame is forced to call upon the services of the city's criminal underworld, headed by Anthony Gliardi, who we are told is a "friend of the family".

Act 2

The years pass. Cal is elected governor and his wife bears a son. The list of favours owed to Gliardi grows longer, Cal's addiction deepens and Grahame's legs finally give way and he is condemned to life in a wheelchair. After a drying-out period, Cal rediscovers his sense of self. He confronts the press, coming clean about his misgivings and the Chandlers' relationship with Gliardi. Cal becomes the media darling once again, however on the eve of the United States Senate nominations, Gliardi uses Tina to lure Cal away from his family, then shoots them both. The play comes full circle as at Cal's funeral, Violet and Grahame move in on Cal's young son. And suddenly the future doesn't look so dim after all.

== Musical numbers ==
=== Donmar Warehouse, 1997 ===
Act 1

- "Advocate/Architect" – Ensemble
- "The Funeral" – Company
- "One, Two, Three" – Cal, Ensemble
- "Embrace Tomorrow" – Violet, Grahame, Bobby
- "Army Chant/Control" – Reed, Cal
- "America's Son" – Cal, Violet, Grahame, Leslie, Supporters, Newscaster
- "I See The Future" – Cal
- "Lonely is a Two-Way Street" – Tina
- "Simple Words" – Cal, Grahame, Reporters
- "Alleluia/Flash, Pop, Sizzle!" – Tina
- "Sense out of Insanity" – Grahame
- "Dangerous Games" – Gliardi, Frankie, Ensemble

Act 2

- "Two Guys at Harvard" – Grahame, Reed, Violet, Ensemble
- "First Came Mercy" – Grahame, Ensemble
- "Bend the Spoon/One, Two, Three (reprise)" – Tina, Cal
- "Cleaning House" – Violet, Peter
- "Upper Hand" – Cal, Grahame
- "Spin" – Violet
- "The Ballad of Bobby "Cracker" Barrel" – Bobby, Ensemble
- "Child's Play" – Cal
- "Simple Words (reprise)" – Cal, Ensemble
- "Lion Hunts the Tiger" – Ensemble
- "Mistress of Deception" – Tina, Ensemble
- "Finale" – Company

=== 1998 onwards ===
Act 1

- "Let the Games Begin" – Reed, Ensemble
- "The Funeral" – Company
- "One, Two, Three" – Cal, Ensemble
- "Embrace Tomorrow" – Violet, Grahame, Bobby
- "Army Chant/Control" – Reed, Cal
- "America's Son" – Cal, Violet, Grahame, Leslie, Supporters, Newscaster
- "I See The Future" – Cal
- "Lonely is a Two-Way Street" – Tina
- "Simple Words" – Cal, Grahame, Reporters
- "Alleluia/Flash, Pop, Sizzle!" – Tina
- "Who Said?" – Grahame
- "Don't Blame the Prince" – Cal
- "Dangerous Games" – Gliardi, Frankie, Ensemble

Act 2

- "Two Guys at Harvard" – Grahame, Reed, Violet, Ensemble
- "Mercy Me" – Grahame, Ensemble
- "One, Two, Three (reprise)" – Tina, Cal
- "Cleaning House" – Violet, Peter
- "Upper Hand" – Cal, Grahame
- "Spin" – Violet
- "The Ballad of Bobby "Cracker" Barrel" – Bobby, Ensemble
- "Child's Play" – Cal
- "Simple Words/Dangerous Games (reprise)" – Cal, Ensemble
- "Mistress of Deception" – Tina, Ensemble
- "Finale" – Company

== Orchestration ==
The Fix is orchestrated for a band of 8 musicians:

- Musical Director/Keyboard 1
- Keyboard 2
- Guitars
- Bass Guitar
- Drums
- Reed 1 (alto and baritone saxophone, and clarinet)
- Reed 2 (clarinet, flute and tenor saxophone)
- Trumpet

The orchestrations are by Michael Gibson.

== Characters and original cast ==
Character	Donmar Warehouse 1997	Signature Theatre 1998	Signature Theatre 2015	Union Theatre 2016	Feinstein's/54 Below In Concert 2017
Cal Chandler	John Barrowman	Stephen Bienskie	Mark Evans	Fra Fee	Mark Evans
Reed Chandler	David Firth	Jim Walton	Bobby Smith	Peter Saul Blewden	Gary Milner
Grahame Chandler	Philip Quast	Sal Mistretta	Lawrence Redmond	Ken Christiansen	David Cantor
Violet Chandler	Kathryn Evans	Linda Balgord	Christine Sherrill	Lucy Williamson	Sally Ann Triplett
Peter Hale	David Bardsley	Donna Migliaccio	Stephen Gregory Smith	Sam Barrett	Justin Randolph
Tina McCoy	Krysten Cummings	Natalie Toro	Rachel Zampelli	Madalena Alberto	Kristen Gehling
Bobby “Cracker” Barrel	Bogdan Kominowski	Lawrence Redmond	Will Gartshore	Alistair Hill	Patrick K. Walsh
Anthony Gliardi	Nicholas Pound	Anthony Galde	Dan Manning	Peter Saul Blewden	Paul Thomas Ryan
