= The Wiggles Pty Ltd =

Australian entertainment company

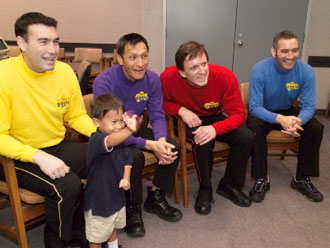
Original members of The Wiggles, 2004. Left to right: Greg Page, Jeff Fatt, Murray Cook, and Anthony Field

The Wiggles Pty Limited (formerly The Wiggles Touring Pty. Limited) is the Australian business created by the founders of the Australian children's music group The Wiggles. The group was protective of their brand, and adopted many of the same business practices as The Cockroaches, the former band of Anthony Field and Jeff Fatt, two of their founding members. They remained as independent as possible, and retained full creative control and ownership of every aspect of their business. As Field stated, The Wiggles Pty Ltd was "not your regular 'corporate culture'." The group made decisions by consensus and made business decisions based upon their experience as performers and their knowledge of early childhood education. They did not tour with a large troupe of dancers, cast, and crew until the late 1990s, and had high expectations regarding the behaviour and attitude of everyone associated with the group. They made careful decisions regarding their endorsements of toys and other products, and avoided over-extending their brand by only licensing products that correlated with their image.

The Wiggles formally consolidated their business in 2005, and consistently appeared in Business Review Weekly's yearly list of Australia's richest entertainers. They faced difficulty in producing a television show with the Australian Broadcasting Corporation, so they created thirteen episodes of a self-produced television series. By 2002, they began airing their TV programs exclusively with the ABC and became "the most successful property that the ABC has represented in the pre-school genre". In 2009, they partnered with the digital cable channel Sprout to broadcast their TV shows. In 2012, due to the effects of the worldwide recession, they cut back on much of their international expansions.

Other ventures of The Wiggles Pty Ltd included franchising their concept to South America, Taiwan, and other countries, opening "Wiggles World" sections in theme parks, and online offerings.

== Business philosophy ==
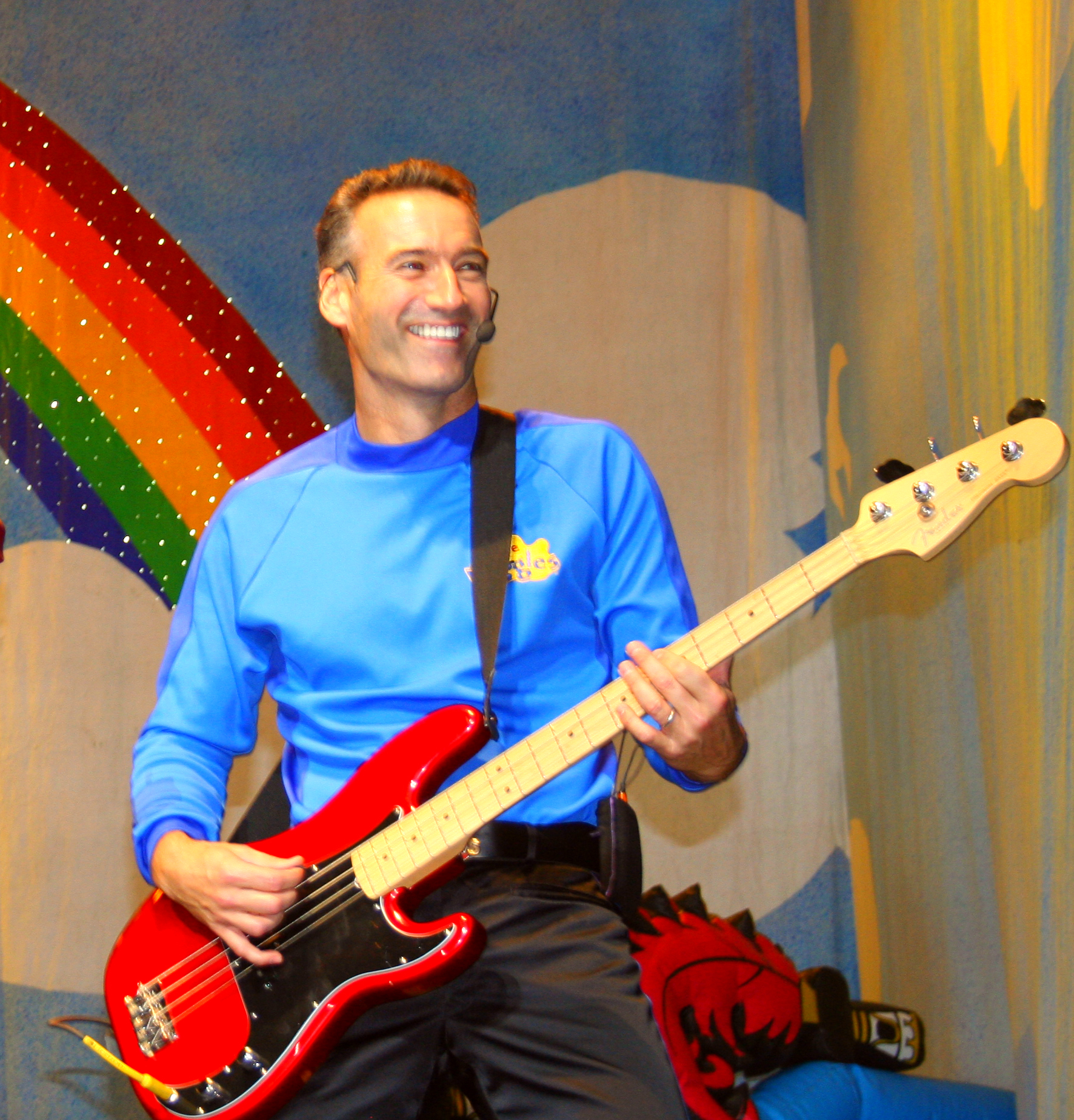
Anthony Field, 2007.

Despite Anthony Field's expressed dislike of the term "branding", preferring to refer to it as "preserving the good name of The Wiggles", the group has stressed the importance of, and are very protective of, their brand. Field, along with bandmate Jeff Fatt and Field's brothers Paul and John, were in the pop band The Cockroaches in the 1980s; as Field reported, The Wiggles adopted many of The Cockroaches' business practices. They chose to remain as independent and self-contained as possible. The four original members retained ownership and creative control over every aspect of their business, and used outside companies to assist them as their business and popularity grew. As Field reported, "...Our venture developed organically. We weren't put together in some sort of Hollywood studio executive's office". They used Field's family members and friends in the early years: former Cockroaches such as Field's brothers and Cockroach drummer Tony Henry (Wiggles character Henry the Octopus was named after him) for musical support; Field's nieces and nephews to perform in their inexpensive videos; their girlfriends to perform as their costumed characters. The wife of founding member Murray Cook made their first costumes. As Fatt reported, "it was very much a cottage industry". They served as their own roadies and travelled in Fatt's van, which he drove, towing a trailer with borrowed equipment. Fatt did their bookkeeping on an old computer the first five to six years of the group's existence. They did their own merchandising, which consisted of selling albums, toys, and t-shirts out of a suitcase set up on the back of a trailer.

Trust your creative and business instincts and maintain control of your destiny".

Anthony Field's stated business philosophy, 2012

As Field reported, The Wiggles Pty Ltd was "not your regular 'corporate culture'". The four original members made decisions by consensus and would spend more time on creative decisions than on business ones. Field reported that many of their key products were launched "during a brief pause in an Xbox game on our tour bus". They answered to no one but themselves, with no executive board or shareholders. As Field stated, they made business decisions based upon their experience as performers and their knowledge of early childhood education, "rather than elaborate, long-term business and strategic plans". When they ventured into international markets, first to the U.S. and the UK in 1998, they chose to follow the same practices that were successful in Australia by keeping their stage show simple: inexpensive props and effects, and the four original members, along with their characters, singing and dancing for their audiences. Financing every business venture themselves, they had to bear the consequences when their ventures did not succeed.

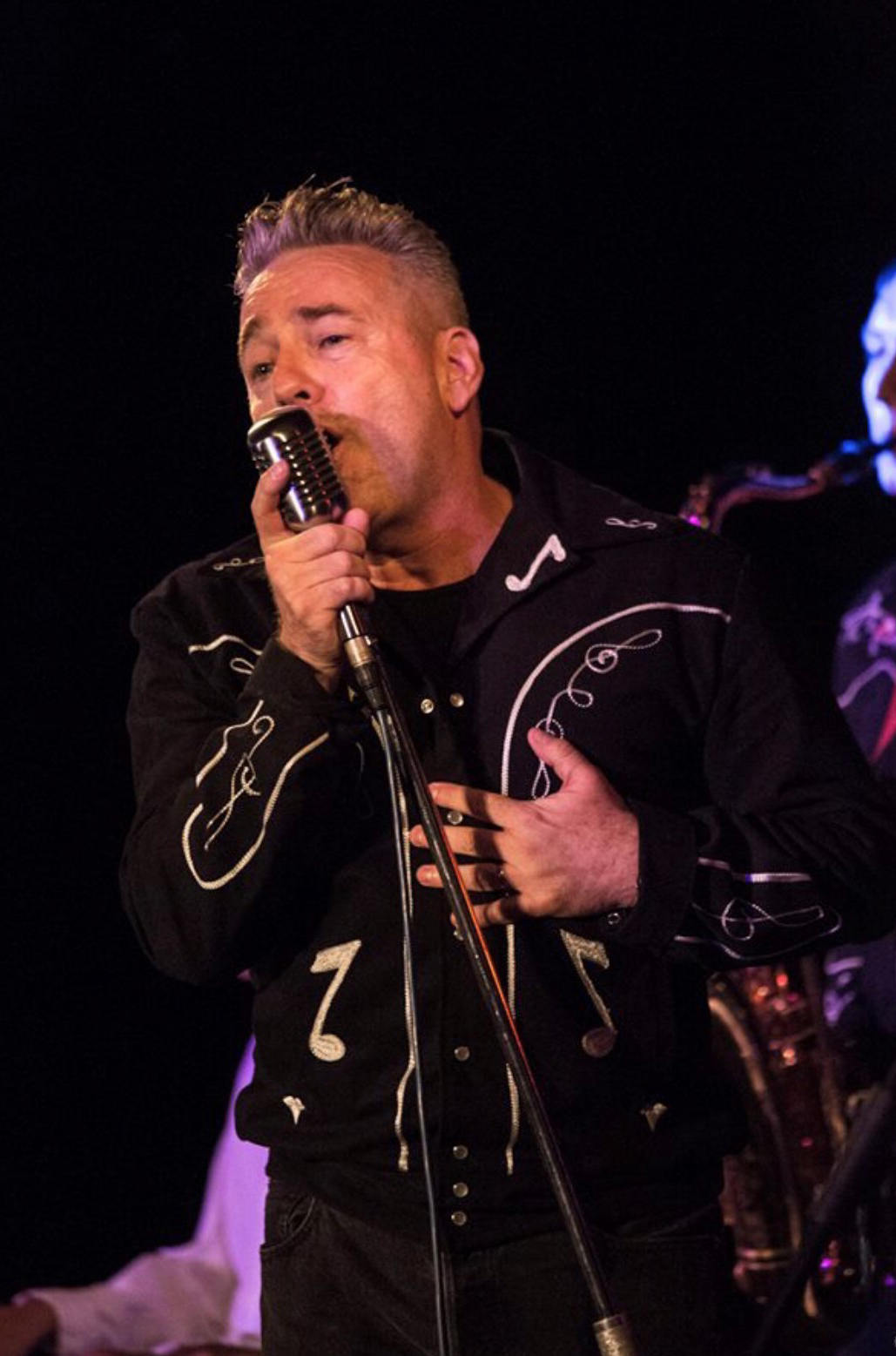
Paul Field, 2019

The Wiggles became formally consolidated in 2005. The group's board of directors consisted of the original three members, Paul Field, who has been general manager of operations since the group was formed and their manager since the mid-1990s, and Mike Conway, who had worked for Ernst & Young in England and was their general manager responsible for their expansion into international markets from 2001 to 2012.

In 2012, The Wiggles cut back much of their international expansion after, like many businesses, experiencing a decrease in their profits after the worldwide recession a few years earlier. Paul Field reported that they would "refocus on what we do best", which included their live shows, CDs, DVDs, and television productions.

The group has always had a strict code of conduct based on zero tolerance of drug use, drinking, smoking, or bad language by any employee of their organisation. They did not tour with a large troupe of dancers and cast members until the late 1990s, but as Field reported, "We've been lucky with our cast, our turnover is pretty minimal—we've always had great loyalty from, and talent among, the professionals". By 2005, they travelled using two 16-metre (52 ft) trucks, three tour buses, a cast of 13 dancers (called "the Wiggly dancers"), and 10 permanent crew members. According to Field, they required that the cast and crew of all their productions have a positive and respectful relationship with their audience, both on stage and off.

== Merchandising ==
The Wiggles recognised that toys were a necessary part of a child's normal development, especially his or her motor and language skills, so they trod the "fine line between maintaining and promoting early childhood values and operating in the commercial arena", and as Field put it, "proceeded cautiously". At first, Cook reviewed every merchandising proposal they received, but turned it over to other companies such as the Toronto-based toy company Spin Master in later years, although Field reported that they continued to "sign off on things". The group avoided over-extending their brand by only licensing products that correlated with their image, like endorsing healthy foods, and by remaining within the preschool and family markets.

The group was named Australia's richest entertainers by Business Review Weekly (BRW) for four years in a row (2004–2008) They earned A$45 million in 2009, when they were third on BRW's annual list. In 2011, the worldwide recession hit The Wiggles, as it had many Australian entertainers; they earned $28.2 million and had a 28% decrease in profits, but they still appeared second on the BRW's list that year. According to BRW, the group restructured The Wiggles Pty Ltd in 2011 when they downsized staff and re-focused on the more profitable aspects of the business, including their music, TV, and DVD ventures. Conway reported that 2011 was "the toughest year I have experienced economically, at [The] Wiggles or anywhere". They showed negative equity by the end of the year, and in their first loss of profits in over ten years, resulted in a 28 percent decrease in income from the previous year. Conway blamed the poor economy, the group's decrease in their U.S. tour from twelve weeks to five, difficulties in stocking DVDs at Walmart, and the cost of changing to a new digital format.

By 2012, founding members Anthony Field, Cook, and Fatt retained 30% ownership of their brand, and Paul Field and Conway each owned 5%. (Note: Conway relinquished his financial interests when he left The Wiggles Pty Ltd in 2012.) Page received a payout of about $20 million when he left the group and the business in 2006. Also in 2012, The Wiggles appeared second on BRW's list, earning $17.167 million, despite negative press they received after Page returned and replaced Moran. In early 2013, Fatt, Cook, and Page retired from the group for medical and personal reasons. They were replaced by former back-up singers Lachlan Gillespie, Simon Pryce, and Emma Watkins, so that the group could continue to develop and preserve their brand. Although they insisted that they chose Watkins, the group's first female member, because she was the most qualified for the job, they admitted that it was "a strategy for marketing the Wiggles into the next generation".

== Television and DVD production ==
In the early years of the group's existence, it seemed "logical" to develop a television program that both entertained and conveyed sound and developmentally appropriate values. At the time, according to Field, Australian children's TV "was an extremely staid and cautious genre", so it was difficult for them to break into it. They filmed a television pilot for the Australian Broadcasting Corporation (ABC) because they felt a program on the network would receive the most exposure to the pre-school market, but as The Sydney Morning Herald (SMH) reported in 2002, "the project never got off the ground due to irreconcilable artistic differences". Also according to the SMH, the ABC told them that they could not communicate with children, and that the members of the group should "not speak, just sing". The ABC insisted that instead of what the SMH called their "trademark colourful skivvies and black trousers", they wear shorts and caps. The Wiggles responded to this criticism by creating thirteen episodes of a self-produced television series, The Wiggles, which they funded from their tours and video sales. In this series, and in most of their early series, they cut costs by using two cameras and visually checked the performance of each song; that way, according to Paul Field, it took them less time to complete a forty-minute video than it took other production companies to complete a three-minute music video.

They sold the program to Australia's Channel Seven, and then moved it to the ABC in 1998 and to the Disney Channel in 1999. Paul Field reported that in the early 2000s, a meeting at a New York licensing fair with Grahame Grassby, the ABC's acting director of enterprises, led to the ABC's "enthusiastic" agreement to produce The Wiggles' TV shows. Beginning in 2002, The Wiggles filmed four seasons worth of shows exclusively with the ABC: Lights, Camera, Action, Wiggles aired on the ABC in 2003, The Wiggles Show in 2005 and 2006, and Wiggle and Learn in 2008. The network called them "the most successful property that the ABC has represented in the pre-school genre". In 2006, The Wiggles opened their own recording and film studios in Sydney, called "Hot Potato Studios". They were the first pre-school production company in Australia to shoot their videos and TV programs in high-definition.

In 2009, as Cook put it, "to try somewhere else, and to freshen up our brand a bit", The Wiggles ended their long relationship with the Disney Channel in the U.S. when they entered into a five-year-long partnership with the digital cable channel Sprout. They also aired previous episodes of their show on the channel, created and hosted a three-hour block of programming that aired in the mornings, and created online and on-demand content. Sprout called the partnership "Our biggest acquisition... that Sprout has ever done". Cook stated that the move was not "acrimonious", and although the group owed much of their early success to Disney, that it "was just business". Anthony Field would also later state in 2014 that Disney had wanted to own The Wiggles outright, but they insisted on staying independent. The first decade of the 21st century ended with The Wiggles expanding their brand by creating new shows, including The Dorothy the Dinosaur Show and Baby Antonio's Circus in 2009, a three-minute show that featured Field's oldest son and acrobatics.

== Other ventures ==
In 2005, as a "relatively short-lived" experiment, the group franchised its concept to other countries. They started in Taiwan, because as Cook stated, they thought the country "was a small enough place, in case it didn't work out". The Taiwanese group was successful, so they branched out to Latin America, casting Spanish-speaking Australians. The Wiggles ceased to pursue additional franchising when they learned that viewers in other countries preferred the original versions of their songs and programs because they helped children learn English, and according to Cook, when it became too hard for them to control, and when it "did not prove lucrative". By 2012, they found that it was easier to simply dub their programs into other languages.

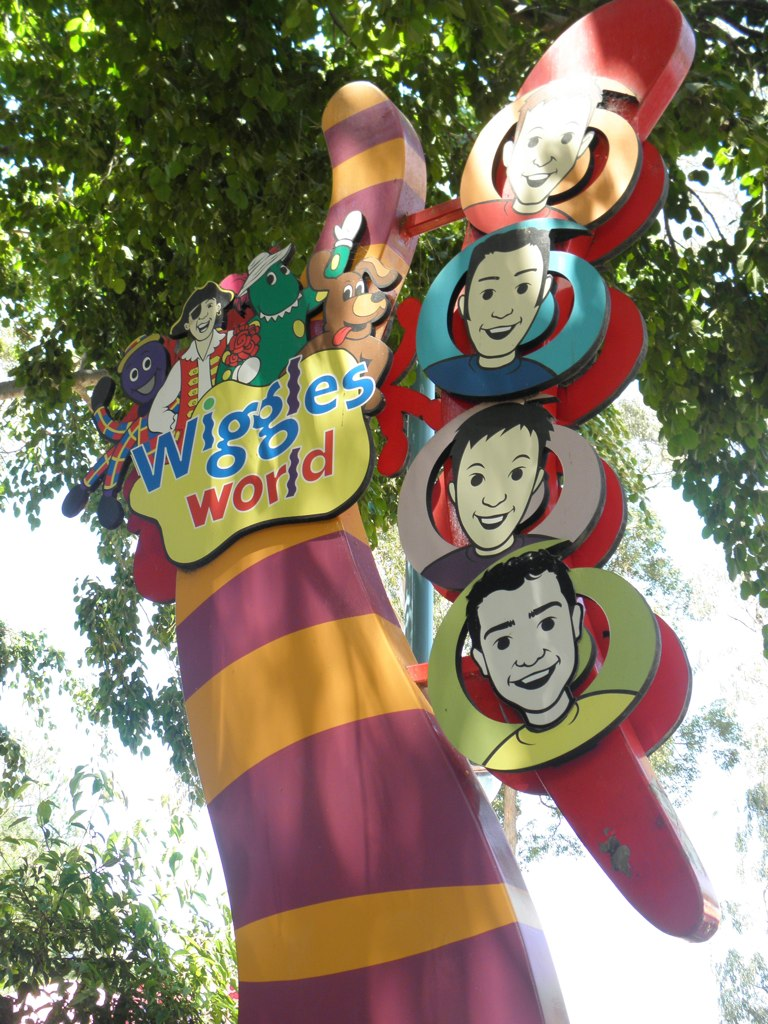
Sign at Wiggles World in Queensland.

Also in 2005, Australia's largest theme park, Dreamworld in Queensland, opened a "Wiggles World" section, which included a Big Red Car ride and a full set for production purposes. The band received licensing rights and sign-off rights for every aspect of the section's operation. Staff at Dreamworld had to take a "Wiggles boot camp", to ensure they followed The Wiggles' code of conduct when dealing with children and their families. Driven by the Dreamworld success, Six Flags opened its first "Wiggles World" section at their largest theme park at Jackson, New Jersey, in April 2007, and planned to open 20 more at its parks across the U.S. in the next decade. The sections emphasised family involvement; they offered joint rides on which parents and children could equally participate. In 2008, Six Flags announced their intentions to open parks with Wiggles World sections in Dubai and across the Arab world. In 2010, after emerging from bankruptcy protection, Six Flags ended their licensing agreements with The Wiggles and other organisations, and changed the themes of their rides and park areas.

In 2005, The Wiggles opened their first play centre in Sydney, and by 2006 had built other play centres throughout Sydney and in the U.S. For a small price, parents were able to take their children to the centres for unlimited educational and play time, as well as themed party rooms for private birthday parties. The play centres also held a gift shop with Wiggles merchandise and a café that served food featured in many of their songs. Three centres in Texas and Sydney were closed as part of their financial restructuring in 2012.

In 2008, the group began to sell downloads of Wiggles ringtones and songs, and streaming video on an on-demand website. On 24 April 2009, the group launched WiggleTime.com, a virtual world website for toddlers and their parents with online games and content, much of which required a pay subscription for premium content. As part of the launch, the company moved the previously free fan club and message board into the subscribed content, but after fan complaints, the free board was reinstated. In 2012, as part of their cost-cutting measures, The Wiggles closed the subscription portion of their site.

== Works cited ==
- Field, Anthony; Truman, Greg (2012). How I Got My Wiggle Back: A Memoir of Healing. Hoboken, New Jersey: John Wiley & Sons. 272pp. ISBN 978-1-118-01933-7.
