= The Widows of Eastwick =

Novel by John Updike

- First edition (US)
- Author: John Updike
- Language: English
- Publisher: Knopf (US); Hamish Hamilton (UK)
- Publication date: October 21, 2008 (US); October 30, 2008 (UK)
- Publication place: United States
- Media type: Print (Hardcover and Paperback)
- ISBN: 0-307-26960-4 (US); ISBN 0-241-14427-2 (UK)
- Preceded by: The Witches of Eastwick

The Widows of Eastwick is the final novel by John Updike, author of the Pulitzer-prize winning "Rabbit" series. First published in 2008, it is a sequel to his 1984 novel The Witches of Eastwick.

== Plot ==
Thirty years have passed since Alexandra Spofford, Jane Smart and Sukie Rougemont terrorized the Rhode Island town of Eastwick with their witchcraft and cavorted with Darryl Van Horne, possibly the devil.

All three women had remarried, left Eastwick and gradually fallen out of touch. They begin to restore their friendship as they one by one become widowed, which is implied to be the work of Jane, the most aggressive of the witches and who had pushed for the death of their romantic rival, Jenny Gabriel, who died of metastasized ovarian cancer shortly after her marriage to Van Horne.

After touring the Canadian Rockies (Alexandra), Egypt (Alexandra and Jane) and China (all three), they agree to revisit Eastwick, largely out of unspoken guilt for their role in Jenny's death. While conducting a white magic spell at their rented condominium (part of Van Horne's old mansion), Jane, who had earlier been complaining of odd electric shocks, suddenly dies of an aneurysm of the aorta.

Alexandra and Sukie both learn that Jenny's brother, Christopher (who had also been Van Horne's lover) killed Jane using methods involving electrons and quantum physics he learned from Van Horne. He plans to kill the other two witches next but doesn't, possibly because Sukie seduces him.

Alexandra returns to New Mexico, where she previously settled with her second husband after first leaving Eastwick, and Sukie moves to Manhattan with Christopher. The two women then happily make plans to meet up for another vacation.

== Critical reception ==
The New York Times. "“The Widows of Eastwick,” while deeply flawed, is a less tendentious, more emotionally credible work than its predecessor."

PopMatters, "In his memoir Self Consciousness, Updike describes a ride home from a skiing trip, sitting next to one of his friend’s wives, and reaching under her clothing to provide a “comradely” rubbing of her clitoris. That word “comradely”, charming in its way, has always made me wonder about Updike’s moral compass, and The Widows of Eastwick has me still wondering."
