= The Witches of Eastwick =

1984 novel by John Updike

- First edition cover
- Author: John Updike
- Language: English
- Genre: Fantasy
- Publisher: Knopf
- Publication date: April 12, 1984
- Publication place: United States
- Media type: Print (hardback & paperback)
- Pages: 320
- ISBN: 0-394-53760-2
- OCLC: 10183130
- Dewey Decimal: 813/.54 19
- LC Class: PS3571.P4 W5 1984
- Followed by: The Widows of Eastwick

The Witches of Eastwick is a 1984 novel by American writer John Updike. A sequel, The Widows of Eastwick, was published in 2008.

== Plot ==
The story, set in the fictional Rhode Island town of Eastwick in the early 1970s, follows the witches Alexandra Spofford, Jane Smart, and Sukie Rougemont, who acquire their powers after their respective marriages end. Their coven is upset by the arrival of Darryl Van Horne, who buys a neglected mansion outside of town. The mysterious Darryl seduces each of the women, encouraging their creative powers and creating a scandal in the town. The power of the three witches grows, so much so that they unknowingly bewitch the townsfolk they come in contact with. This becomes clear when Sukie's lover and boss, Clyde Gabriel, kills his busybody wife Felicia before hanging himself.

The three women share Darryl in relative peace until he unexpectedly marries their young, innocent friend, Jenny, the Gabriels' daughter. The witches resolve to take revenge by giving her cancer through their magic. Although Alexandra feels remorse for their hex, the spell kills Jenny, and Darryl flees town with her younger brother, Chris, apparently his lover. In his wake, he leaves their relationships strained and their sense of self in doubt. Eventually, each summons her ideal man and leaves town.

== Literary significance and criticism ==
Updike described his novel as "about female power, a power that patriarchal societies have denied." Many scholars viewed it as strongly pro-feminist, "an intelligent engagement with feminism, and a rare case of a male novelist writing from women's points of view." Some have expressed concern that the book may be misogynistic, as it seems to reinforce the patriarchal conceptions of women as witches and of women requiring a man for personal growth; others believe that the book may be more of a satire of such ideas.

At the same time, some praised the novel as a departure from Updike's previous novels.

== In other media ==
=== Film ===
In 1987, the novel was adapted into a film starring Jack Nicholson as Darryl, Cher as Alexandra, Susan Sarandon as Jane, and Michelle Pfeiffer as Sukie – with considerable differences from the book's plot. The film's Oscar-nominated score was composed by John Williams.

=== Television ===
In 1992, a television series pilot aired that was directed by Rick Rosenthal and starred Michael Siberry as Darryl, Ally Walker as Alexandra, Julia Campbell as Jane, and Catherine Mary Stewart as Sukie. It was not picked up as a series.

In 2002, a television series pilot was filmed based on the world created in the book, called simply Eastwick. It starred Jason O'Mara as Darryl, Marcia Cross as Jane, Kelly Rutherford as Alexandra, and Lori Loughlin as Sukie. It was not picked up as a series so only the pilot episode exists.

In 2009, The Witches of Eastwick was adapted into a television series on ABC, one entitled Eastwick, with Lindsay Price, Jaime Ray Newman and Rebecca Romijn as the three witches. Paul Gross played Darryl. Veronica Cartwright who had played Felicia Alden in the 1987 movie is also in the cast of the series as Bun Waverly. The show was canceled during its first season.

=== Musical ===
In 2000, the novel was adapted into a stage musical by John Dempsey and Dana P. Rowe, originally staged in London.

In 2002, The Witches of Eastwick musical opened in Australia, starring Paul McDermott as Darryl Van Horne, Marina Prior as Jane Smart, Pippa Grandison as Sukie Rougemont and Angela Toohey as Alexandra Spofford.

In 2007, the stage musical had its American debut at the Signature Theatre in Arlington, Virginia.
