= The Witches of Eastwick (musical) =

- Music: Dana P. Rowe
- Lyrics: John Dempsey
- Book: John Dempsey
- Basis: The Witches of Eastwick novel by John Updike
- Productions: 2000 London West End; 2002 Melbourne, Australia; 2003 Moscow; 2007 Czech Republic; 2007 Arlington, Virginia; 2008 UK Tour; 2011 São Paulo, Brazil, 2012 Slovenia; 2014 Norway; 2018 Warsaw; 2019 Stockholm; 2022 West End Concert; 2024 Czech Republic

The Witches of Eastwick is a 2000 musical based on the 1984 novel of the same name by John Updike. It was adapted by John Dempsey (lyrics and book) and Dana P. Rowe (music), directed by Eric Schaeffer, and produced by Sir Cameron Mackintosh.

The story is based around three female protagonists, the 'Witches': Alexandra Spofford, Jane Smart, and Sukie Rougemont. Frustrated and bored by their mundane lives in the town of Eastwick, a shared longing and desire for "all manner of man in one man" comes to life in the form of a charismatic stranger, a devil-like character, Darryl Van Horne. Seducing each of the women in turn, Darryl teaches them how to expand the powers locked within, though their new unorthodox lifestyle scandalizes the town. As these powers become more sinister and events spiral out of control, the women come to realise that Darryl's influence is corrupting everyone he comes into contact with and resolve to use their new-found strength to exile him from their lives.

== Productions ==
=== Original London production ===
Starring Ian McShane in the role of Darryl Van Horne and Maria Friedman (Sukie), Lucie Arnaz (Alexandra) and Joanna Riding (Jane) as the three witches, the show began its preview period in London's West End on June 24, 2000, at the Theatre Royal, Drury Lane. Opening on July 18 to mixed-positive reviews, the decision was taken to transfer to the more intimate Prince of Wales Theatre from March 23, 2001. Ian McShane left and was replaced by his understudy, Earl Carpenter, whilst the physical production was revised to fit in the smaller theatre. A number of lyrics and scenes were revised and the song 'Who's the Man?' was replaced with a rousing gospel number entitled 'The Glory of Me'. A general cast change from July 1, 2001, saw Clarke Peters lead the company, with Josefina Gabrielle and Rebecca Thornhill as Alex and Sukie respectively, joining Joanna Riding who stayed with the show after receiving the Olivier Award nomination for the role. The show received generally favourable reviews with the second cast but, after a 17-month run, closed on October 27, 2001.

Original London cast ensemble

- Jasna Ivir as Gina Marino
- Tim Walton as Joe Marino
- Anne-Marie McCormack as Gretta Neff
- Kevin Wainwright as Raymond Neff
- Lisa Peace as Marge Persley
- Shaun Henson as Homer Persley
- Earl Carpenter as Reverend Ed Parsley
- Kathryn Akin as Brenda Parsley
- Jocelyn Hawkyard as Rebecca Barnes
- Nick Searle as Toby Bergman
- Valda Aviks as Eudora Bryce
- Matt Dempsey as Curtis Hallerbread
- Scarlett Strallen as Mavis Jessup
- Julia Sutton as Franny Lovecraft
- Chris Holland as Frank Ogden
- Alison Forbes as Mabel Ogden
- Maurice Lane as Dr Henry Pattison
- Jean McGlynn as Marcy Wills
- Sarah Lark as Little Girl

=== Australia, Russia, and Czech Republic ===
The first international production opened in Australia at the Princess Theatre, Melbourne. Starring Paul McDermott as Darryl van Horne, with Marina Prior, Angela Toohey and Pippa Grandison as Jane, Alexandra and Sukie respectively, with Sabrina Batshon, future finalist of Australian Idol season 7, as The Little Girl, and Matt Lee as Michael Spofford, the show began previews on 19 August 2002. Revisions made to the show included minor changes to lyrics, an extended dance break in 'A Little Town', and the excision of one number, 'Loose Ends'. The show closed in Melbourne on 17 November 2002, with the anticipated tour dates in Brisbane, Adelaide and Sydney being cancelled.

The Russian production opened in Moscow on 12 March 2003 using new sets as well as on-stage rain and fire effects. The role of Darryl van Horne was double-cast with Dmitriy Pevtsov and Aleksey Kortnev sharing the part. Other roles were similarly played by two or three actors. A revival was staged in 2007, with scaled down sets and effects, and Pevtsov reprising his role.

The premiere in the Czech Republic opened in February 2007 at the Brno City Theatre, directed by Stanislav Moša and choreographed by Igor Barberić. The show was translated into Czech by Jiří Josek and produced the first commercial recording since the Original London Cast album. This production was also notable for its use of alternates, having most lead character played by two or more actors.

=== U.S. premiere (2007) ===
The American premiere opened at the Signature Theatre in Arlington, Virginia in a limited engagement from June 5, 2007, to July 15, 2007. Directed by Eric Schaeffer, the original director and Signature Theatre's Artistic Director, the cast starred Marc Kudisch as Darryl Van Horne, Jacquelyn Piro Donovan as Sukie Rougemont, Emily Skinner as Alexandra Spofford, and Christiane Noll as Jane Smart. Kudisch received the Helen Hayes Award, Outstanding Lead Actor, Resident Musical.

The authors made numerous changes to the show. Numbers were abbreviated ("Eastwick Knows"), cut ("I Love A Little Town") and added ("Your Wildest Dreams"). Scenes and songs were re-arranged, and the production received positive notices. The Washington Post reviewer wrote that "The musical adaptation has way more kick than the wispy 1987 film.... It's on the technical level that [Eric Schaeffer]'s production still has kinks to work out, for until the actresses are airborne... the mechanics look and feel clunky." BroadwayWorld.com stated that "director Eric Schaeffer certainly pulls The Witches of Eastwick all together... does it ever succeed." CultureVulture.net commented that the show is "full of body-shaking thunder, raunchy behavior, and surprises. Gut reaction based on the performance seen June 17 says this show will make it to Broadway and be reasonably successful there." Talkin' Broadway wrote that the "Broadway actors... give memorable and funny performances in the four lead roles.... Choreographer Karma Camp gets a chance to show off in this production."

Original 2007 U.S. premiere cast ensemble

- David Corington as Joe Marino
- Tammy Roberts as Gina Marino
- Jeremy Benton as Raymond Neff
- Amy McWilliams as Gretta Neff
- Ilona Dulaski as Marge Perley
- Thomas Adrian Simpson as Reverend Ed Parsley
- Sherri L. Edelen as Brenda Parsley
- Diego Preito as Frank Ogden
- Matt Conner as Toby Bergeman
- Brianne Cobuzzi as Rebecca Barnes

=== UK tour (2008–2009) ===
A new, touring production opened on 23 August 2008 at the Theatre Royal, Norwich. Directed by Nikolai Foster with design by Peter Mckintosh, choreography by Geoffrey Garratt and musical direction by Tom Deering, the production visited a further 26 cities before finishing at the King's Theatre, Glasgow on 9 May 2009. Marti Pellow starred as Darryl van Horne, Ria Jones as Alexandra, Poppy Tierney as Jane and, reprising her role from the London production, Rebecca Thornhill as Sukie. The creative team collaborated with the writers on further changes to the material, incorporating many of the rewrites from the American premiere, and making more, such as re-expanding "Eastwick Knows", adding a reprise of "Dance with the Devil" to close the exorcism scene, and reinstating "Loose Ends".

Original 2008 UK tour cast ensemble

- Russel Leighton Dixon as Joe Marino
- Ngo Omene Ngofa as Gina Marino
- Gregory Clarke as Raymond Neff
- Claire Platt as Gretta Neff
- Julie Stark as Marge Perley
- Ralph Birtwell as Reverend Ed Parsley
- Samantha Mercer as Brenda Parsley
- Ross Finnie as Frank Ogden
- Oliver Watton as Toby Bergman
- Vikki Lee Taylor as Rebecca Barnes

=== Brazil (2011) ===
The show opened at Teatro Bradesco in São Paulo on August 13, 2011. The production starred comedy actresses Maria Clara Gueiros and Fafy Siqueira as Alexandra and Felicia, respectively, and minor television actor Eduardo Galvão as Darryl.

=== Slovenia (2012) ===
The show opened at Ljubljana festival 2012, where was a part of main festival events. It is the first Slovenian production, made by Ljubljana City Theatre. The show was very successful and had a huge number of performances. It was directed by Stanislav Moša.

2012 Slovenian cast ensemble

- Tomaž Pipan as Joe
- Boris Kerč as Raymond
- Domen Anžlovar as Ed
- Stannia Boninsegna as Brenda
- Marijana Jaklič Klanšek as Greta
- Maja Boh Hočevar as Gina

=== Austria (2013) ===
The show opened at the newly erected Musiktheater Linz on April 13, 2013. It was the first production of the new Musical Theatre Department of Landestheater Linz. It was translated into German by Roman Hinze, directed by Matthias Davids and choreographed by Melissa King. It was played in repertoire for 27 performances until January 26, 2014

=== Norway (2014) ===
The show opened at Sandvika Teater in Bærum just outside Oslo on March 27, 2014. This was the first time the show was performed in Scandinavia. The Production was performed by a local Musical Theatre Company named BærMuDa. Directed and choreographed by Christer Tornell and Nina Lill Svendsen. It was a limited run and closed April 5, 2014

=== Poland (2018) ===
The show started a new season in the Syrena Theatre in the Polish capital Warsaw on March 3, 2018. It was translated into Polish and directed by Jacek Mikolajczyk, the Syrena Theatre's new director, and choreographed by Jaroslaw Staniek. Having received positive reviews of the critics and the audience it is still in the repertoire of the theatre.

=== Sweden (2019) ===
A Swedish production opened at Cirkus in Stockholm on September 19, 2019. Directed by Edward af Sillén and translated by af Sillén and Daniel Rehn it featured original London cast member Peter Jöback in the male lead role and Linda Olsson, Vanna Rosenberg and Kayo as the three witches.

=== Other productions ===
The Ogunquit Playhouse staged the American Northeast premiere of The Witches of Eastwick musical at the historic southern Maine theatre September 3–27, 2014. Cast included James Barbour as Darryl Van Horne, Nancy Anderson as Sukie, Sara Gettelfinger as Alexandra, Mamie Parris as Jane Smart, and Sally Struthers as Felicia. Members of the creative team including director Shaun Kerrison, musical director and supervisor Julian Bigg, and authors John Dempsey and Dana P. Rowe revisited the material and made a number of changes. A new song for Darryl and Alexandra replaced "Your Wildest Dreams" and the number "I Love a Little Town" was re-instated.

In April 2014, the Musical Theatre Strand at The BRIT School for Performing Arts and Technology in Croydon, UK staged a production of The Witches Of Eastwick as part of the Musical Theatre Final Major Project Season 2014. Cast included Tarrin Callendar as Daryl Van Horne, Sadie Shirley and Kiera Magurie as Alexandra Spofford, Katie Shalka and Erica Lebedeva as Jane Smart, Kirsty King and Eloise Rudkin as Sukie Rougemont, Jake Watkins and Daniel Maybury as Michael Spofford, Joseph Press as Clyde Gabriel and Eleanor Walsh as Felicia Gabriel. The production was staged in the BRIT Theatre. The Creative Team included Robert Holt (Director), Kerry Quinn (Musical Director) and Sam Spencer-Lane (Choegrapher). There were Student Creative Team Leaders including Dylan Lee (Assistant Director), Daniel Maybury (Vocal Leader), Joseph Press and Eleanor Walsh (Dance Captains).

On the 20th June 2022, a concert version was staged at the Sondheim Theatre, London, directed by Maria Friedman who had originated the role of Sukie in the original London production. The concert starred John Partridge as Darryl van Horne, with Natasha J Barnes, Laura Pitt-Pulford, and Carrie Hope Fletcher as Alexandra, Jane, and Sukie respectively. Also featured in the cast were Claire Moore as Felicia Gabriel, Nathan Amzi as Clyde Gabriel, Alfie Friedman as Michael Spofford, and Chrissie Bhima as Jennifer Gabriel. For this presentation, "A Little Town", "Eye of the Beholder", and "Who’s the Man" were restored to the score, and Maria Friedman and Carrie Hope Fletcher sung "Loose Ends" as an encore, accompanied by composer Dana P Rowe.

=== Readings and amateur productions ===
Prior to opening in London, a reading was held in New York on 5 March 1999 starring lyricist John Dempsey as Darryl van Horne with Sandy Duncan, Ruthie Henshall and Jacquelyn Piro Donovan as the three witches. In 2003 a staged reading took place at the Manhattan Theater Club under the direction of Gabriel Barre, starring James Barbour, Emily Skinner, Carolee Carmello and Jennifer Laura Thompson.

The show received its amateur premiere in Australia in July 2005. Over a dozen licensed productions followed in the UK and Ireland. The license was withdrawn due to the 2008 UK tour, with a single amateur company being permitted to stage a concurrent production in October 2008.

The amateur rights were re-released by MTI in March 2023.

== Plot ==
Setting: the fictional Rhode Island town of Eastwick

Act I

A little girl sings the praises of her little town of Eastwick, Rhode Island, which she creates using her imagination, as well as its inhabitants who describe Eastwick as a town where everyone looks through their curtains at everyone else and where gossip is more powerful than the truth ("Eastwick Knows"). A forced parade led by and honouring self-appointed First Lady of Eastwick, Felicia Gabriel, overtakes proceedings but as she is about to receive her prize an unexpected thunderstorm forces everyone to run home.

Alexandra (Alex), Jane and Sukie, the three Witches, have retreated to Alex's living room for peanut butter brownies, martinis and begin to complain. They talk about their boredom with their current relationships which include casual sex, abstinence and Sukie's affair with Felicia's husband, Clyde. Alex's son, Michael, enters with his girlfriend, Jennifer, who also happens to be Felicia's daughter. The teenagers are disgustingly in love with each other and the Witches, seeing how happy they are, sing about the kind of man they would like in their lives ("Make Him Mine").

In Felicia's kitchen, Felicia and Clyde show how truly unhappy they are and how Felicia is determined to keep her public face on their relationship. The phone rings; a man from New York has arrived and bought the deserted Lenox Mansion and is tearing down the trees in his backyard. Felicia, being the considerate soul she is, thinks of the snowy egrets that will lose their homes and decides to rally the town to stop him. Arriving at Lenox Mansion, Darryl Van Horne emerges from a puff of smoke and begins to charm all the residents except Felicia ("I Love A Little Town"). The "Eastwick Preservation Society" banner explodes in a fireball and everyone flees.

Darryl meets Alexandra on the beach where she is sculpting in the sand. Embarrassed, she allows Darryl to take her back to his house. They discuss sculpture and Darryl begins his seduction ("Eye of the Beholder"). Gossip begins to work its way round the town and Darryl goes to Jane's studio where she is playing the cello. They discuss music and have a wild and sexual cello/violin duet which ends in the cello playing by itself and a massive musical and actual orgasm ("Waiting For The Music To Begin").

Clyde promises Sukie that he will leave Felicia but she enters with Jennifer and catches the two of them. Their excuse is that they are preparing research on Darryl and Lenox Mansion. When Sukie returns home Darryl is waiting for her. Darryl gets Sukie to break out of her introverted shell and talk to him ("Words, Words, Words"). Instead of sleeping with her, he invites her to a tennis game. It is only when Sukie arrives and sees Alex and Jane that all three realise that Darryl has been sleeping with all of them. He serves a ball which explodes in mid-air and says that he is the man they prayed for.

Michael and Jennifer meet and sing their puppy-love duet ("Something") while the rest of the town meet to do laundry and gossip about Darryl and his conquests ("Dirty Laundry"). During the number, Felicia, to her horror, discovers Jennifer kissing Michael and immediately sends her away from Eastwick.

Alex, Jane and Sukie enter, each wearing a stunning sexy dress singing about their childhood insecurities ("I Wish I May"). Darryl sweet talks the women and teaches them how to curse Felicia by throwing things into an enchanted cookie jar. They throw a tennis ball, a bracelet and some feathers into the jar and immediately, Felicia starts to throw up...a tennis ball, a bracelet and some feathers. Enchanted, the Witches turn to Darryl who tells them to close their eyes and suddenly they are flying high above the audience.

Act II

Darryl invites Alex to Mexican Night at his house and she reflects on her single-minded pursuit ("Another Night At Darryl’s"). At Nemo's Diner, Darryl bumps into Felicia and Clyde. He taunts her and she vomits a cherry pit. Seeing that Eastwick's men have no idea how to please their women Darryl teaches the town about how to have real sex ("Dance With The Devil").

The Witches go to Darryl's in coats and take them off to reveal matching lingerie. Just as they are about to have sex, Darryl's manservant, Fidel, delivers a letter from The Eastwick Preservation Society that says they are suing him for filling in the wetlands. In revenge, all four start throwing anything they can find into the cookie jar. In Felicia's kitchen, we see the result as she screams at the still bewitched Clyde ("Evil"). Eventually, she can no longer cope with the curse and tells Clyde to do something so he hits her with a frying pan. Suddenly free of Felicia he shouts that he is finally happy. However, with her dying breath, Felicia pulls Clyde's tie into the waste disposal unit and turns it on.

The Witches start to avoid Darryl. When they return to Lenox Mansion, they tell Darryl that he has taken it too far. Furious, he screams at them but they run away and Darryl swears revenge. On the beach, Sukie bumps into the now orphaned Jennifer. She tries to offer advice but cannot find the words ("Loose Ends"). Darryl enters once Sukie leaves and begins to seduce Jennifer. He tricks her into marrying him and this news prompts the Witches to send Darryl back where he belongs.

Before the wedding Darryl leads the town in singing the praises of himself ("The Glory of Me"). The wedding begins but the Witches appear and, using a voodoo doll of Darryl they begin attacking him ("The Wedding"). Vowing revenge, Darryl is thrown back to Hell in a fireball and the church collapses. Michael and Jennifer are reunited ("Something" Reprise) and the Witches realise the error of their ways ("Look At Me").

== Casts ==
| Character | West End | London | Australia | Czech Republic | U.S. Premiere | U.K. Tour | Brazil | Slovenia | Austria | Norway |
| Character | 2000 | 2001 | 2002 | 2007 | | 2008 | 2011 | 2012 | 2013 | 2014 |
|---|---|---|---|---|---|---|---|---|---|---|
| Daryl Van Horne | Ian McShane | Earl Carpenter | Paul McDermott | Petr Gazdík / Petr Štěpán | Marc Kudisch | Marti Pellow | Eduardo Galvão | [?] | Reinwald Kranner | Lars Arne Rinde |
| Alexandra "Alex" Spofford | Lucie Arnaz | Josefina Gabrielle | Angela Toohey | Ivana Vaňková / Jana Musilová / Yvetta Blanarovičová | Emily Skinner | Ria Jones | Maria Clara Gueiros | Tanja Ribič | Kristin Hölck | Cecilie Due |
| Jane Smart | Joanna Riding | Joanna Riding | Marina Prior | Johana Gazdíková / Markéta Sedláčková | Christiane Noll | Poppy Tierney | Sabrina Korgut | Viktorija Bencik Emeršič / Pia Zemljič | Daniela Dett | Kristin Rinde Sunde |
| Sukie Rougemount | Maria Friedman | Rebecca Thornhill | Pippa Grandison | Alena Antalová / Radka Coufalová | Jacquelyn Piro Donovan | Rebecca Thornhill | Renata Ricci | Iva Krajnc Bagola | Lisa Antoni | Marianne Snekkestad |
| Felicia Gabrial | Rosemary Ashe | Rosemary Ashe | Geraldine Turner | Lenka Bartolšicová | Karlah Hamilton | Rachel Izen | Fafy Siqueira | Mirjam Korbar | Karen Robertson | Monica Berg Ludvigsen |
| Clyde Gabrial | Stephen Tate | Stephen Tate | Tony Sheldon | Igor Ondříček / Milan Němec | Harry A. Winter | James Graeme | Renato Rabelo | Gregor Gruden | Rob Pelzer | Brynjar Lilleheim |
| Jennifer Gabrial | Caroline Sheen | Caroline Sheen | Penny McNamee | Mária Lalková | Erin Driscoll | Joanna Kirkland | Clara Verdier | Viktorija Bencik Emeršič / Tina Potočnik Vrhovnik | Ariana Schirasi-Fard | Ida Rinde Sunde |
| Michael Spofford | Peter Jöback | Paul Spicer | Matt Lee | Jakub Uličník / Dušan Vitázek | James Gardiner | Chris Thatcher | André Torquato | Domen Valič | Oliver Liebl | Christian Ranke |
| Fidel | Gee Williams | Gee Williams | [?] | Tomáš Sagher | Scott J. Strasbaugh | Oliver Walker | Ben Ludmer | Jure Kopušar | [?] | Håkon Steinsholt |
| Little Girl | Sarah Lark | Sarah Lark | Sabrina Batshon | Karolína Čtveráčková / Marie Juráčková | Brittany O'Grady | Victoria Hay | Larissa Manoela / Isabella Moreira | Liza Humer | Tina Haas | Sine Helene Strømberg |

=== Notable cast replacements ===
London (2001)

- Daryl Van Horne: Clarke Peters

Australia (2002)

- Felicia Gabrial: Rosemary Ashe (Emergency)

Czech Republic (2007)

- Sukie Rougemount: Hana Holišová
- Felicia Gabrial: Zuzana Mauréry

== Musical numbers ==
=== London (as of closing night - 27 October 2001) ===
Act One

- Overture
- Eastwick Knows
- Make Him Mine
- A Little Town
- Eye of the Beholder
- Waiting for the Music
- Words, Words, Words
- Something
- Dirty Laundry
- I Wish I May

Act Two

- Entr’acte
- Another Night at Darryl's
- Dance with the Devil
- Another Night at Darryl's (reprise)
- Evil
- Dirty Laundry (reprise)
- Loose Ends
- A Little Town (reprise)
- I Wish I May (reprise)
- The Glory of Me
- The Wedding
- Something (reprise)
- Look At Me

Cut Songs

- Before the Night (cut in previews)
- What about the Egrets? (cut in previews)
- What Everyone Woman Wants (cut in previews)
- Who's the Man? (cut when the show moved from the Theatre Royal, Drury Lane to the Prince of Wales Theatre, replaced with 'The Glory of Me')
- Loose Ends (cut during previews in Australia in 2002, as well as all subsequent amateur productions)

=== US premiere production ===
Act One

- Overture
- Eastwick Knows
- Make Him Mine
- Darryl van Horne
- Waiting for the Music
- Words, Words, Words
- Your Wildest Dreams
- Something
- Dirty Laundry
- I Wish I May
- Finale - Act One

Act Two

- Another Night at Darryl's
- Dance with the Devil
- Evil
- Dirty Laundry (reprise)
- Darryl van Horne (reprise)
- The Wedding / Dance With the Devil (Reprise) - UK Tour 2008
- Look At Me

=== 2014 New England premiere ===
Act One

- Overture
- Eastwick Knows - Citizens of Eastwick
- Make Him Mine - Alexandra, Jane, and Sukie
- Eastwick Knows (reprise) - Felicia and Townsfolk
- I Love A Little Town - Darryl and Townsfolk
- Waiting For the Music To Begin - Jane and Darryl
- Words, Words, Words - Sukie and Darryl
- The Feminine Mystique - Alexandra
- Little Miracles - Alexandra, Jane, and Sukie
- Something - Michael and Jennifer
- Tennis - Darryl, Alexandra, Jane, and Sukie
- I Wish I May - Alexandra, Sukie, Jane, and Darryl

Act Two

- Another Night at Darryl's - Alexandra, Jane, and Sukie
- Dance with the Devil - Darryl, Michael, and Townsfolk
- Another Night at Darryl's (reprise) - Little Girl, Alexandra, Jane, and Sukie
- Evil - Felicia
- Dirty Laundry (reprise) - Alexandra, Sukie, Jane, and Townsfolk
- Waiting For the Music To Begin (reprise) - Jane
- Words, Words, Words (reprise) - Sukie
- I Love A Little Town (reprise) - Darryl and Townsfolk
- The Feminine Mystique (reprise) - Little Girl and Alexandra
- I Wish I May (reprise) - Jennifer
- The Glory Of Me - Darryl and Townsfolk
- The Wedding - Company
- Look At Me - Sukie, Jane, Alexandra

=== 2019 Stockholm, Production ===
Act One

- Overture
- Eastwick Knows - Citizens of Eastwick
- Make Him Mine - Alexandra, Jane, and Sukie
- Eastwick Knows (reprise) - Felicia and Townsfolk
- I Love A Little Town - Darryl and Townsfolk
- Waiting For the Music To Begin - Jane and Darryl
- Words, Words, Words - Sukie and Darryl
- The Eye of the Beholder - Alexandra
- Something - Michael and Jennifer
- Tennis - Darryl, Alexandra, Jane, and Sukie
- I Wish I May - Alexandra, Sukie, Jane, and Darryl

Act Two

- Another Night at Darryl's - Alexandra, Jane, and Sukie
- Dance with the Devil - Darryl, Michael, and Townsfolk
- Another Night at Darryl's (reprise) - Little Girl, Alexandra, Jane, and Sukie
- Evil - Felicia
- Dirty Laundry (reprise) - Alexandra, Sukie, Jane, and Townsfolk
- Waiting For the Music To Begin (reprise) - Jane
- Three Little Lasdies (new version) - Darryl
- I wish I may (reprise) - Sukie
- I Love A Little Town (reprise) - Darryl and Townsfolk
- I Wish I May (reprise) - Jennifer
- Who's the Man? - Darryl and Townsfolk
- The Wedding - Company
- Look At Me - Sukie, Jane, Alexandra

== Awards and nominations ==
2001 Olivier Awards:

- Best New Musical (nomination)
- Best Actress in a Musical - Joanna Riding (nomination)
- Best Supporting Actress in a Musical - Rosemary Ashe (nomination)
- Best Lighting Design (nomination)
