= Brewer (John Updike) =

Fictional city

Brewer, Pennsylvania is a fictional city that serves as the major setting for American writer John Updike's "Rabbit" cycle of novels (comprising Rabbit, Run, Rabbit Redux, Rabbit Is Rich, Rabbit at Rest, and Rabbit Remembered, two of which won Pulitzer Prizes for Updike). It is the center of the only fictional universe which Updike developed across multiple works, and symbolically represents his assessment of American culture from 1959 to 1999.

== Depiction ==
Brewer is described as being the "fifth largest city in Pennsylvania", and seems to have many characteristics in common with the real-life city of Reading, Pennsylvania, but is in fact a composite of many places. Brewer is large enough to have a daily newspaper as well as a weekly, the Brewer Vat, printed by the company where Rabbit works as a linotypist in Rabbit Redux, and a fairly well-defined social and class structure. It also has a cinema multiplex, which Updike uses as a device to define the era in which each novel is set by frequently listing which films are playing there. Rabbit eventually comes to head the city's Toyota car dealership, inherited by his wife from her father. Brewer is called the "flowerpot city" due to its extensive use of red brick. Updike, a Pennsylvania native, set much of his fiction in the state, largely in Brewer and in the much smaller rural town of Olinger. The novels also include a setting called Mt. Judge, a suburb of Brewer modeled after the real-life Mt. Penn, Pennsylvania.

== Themes ==
Brewer represents a typical middle-class American town, one that scholar Laurence W. Mazzeno describes as an "all-American city". Writer and literature professor Erik Kielland-Lund wrote that Brewer is used to depict "details of the American urban scene" and the "landscapes of contemporary America". Brewer at times serves as a representation of American capitalism and commercial materialism, or what writer Peter J. Bailey describes as "an omnipresence of commodities and pop culture creates a pervasive aura of oppressively banal, soulless materialism."

=== Commentary on America ===
Brewer reflects all the changes that occur in American society from 1959 to the 1980s and beyond. This included changes in once long-standing institutions, as Brewer's church and ministers become more socialized. Other changes in American society are reflected in Brewer, such as altering family patterns, with an increase in divorce, working mothers, and family counseling, as well as the rise of new classes and groups such as African Americans, Latinos, women, gay men and women, and white-collar workers. These changes also extend to entertainment, leisure, and sports: country clubs become more prevalent, characters go on vacation more frequently or retire to Florida, and golf becomes accessible to the middle class. Brewer also grows seedier over time, as reflected by increases in recreational drugs, riots, and white-collar crime, as well as formerly luxurious movie theaters gradually becoming pornographic theaters. By the novel Rabbit Is Rich, Brewer has changed so much that protagonist Harry Angstrom begins to feel few connections to the city anymore; as Bailey writes, Angstrom feels "no remaining link to a world of cultural difference and personal growth".

Brewer experiences an economic decline over time, serving at times as a center of racial unrest and urban blight. Both declining and emerging businesses are depicted as the city's economy changes and evolves, particularly in its portrayal of linotyping giving way to printed technology. High-tech industries and upscale housing developments are welcomed as the city's economy changes. These changes inspire mixed emotions, with Kielland-Lund describing Brewer as prompting "nostalgic longing for a vanishing pastoral ideal and grudging acceptance of the potential beauty of the cold and metallic urban landscape". One passage in Rabbit Run describes the city as a "treeless waste of industry, shoe factories and bottling plants and company parking lots and knitting mills converted to electronics parts and elephantine gas tanks lifting above trash-filled swampland". Rabbit Redux describes the city's attempts to revive its fledgling downtown neighborhood, tearing away entire blocks of buildings to create parking lots and exposing church facades. The novel describes this development in stark terms, describing the result as "generating new perspectives of rear entryways and half-alleys and intensifying the cruel breadth of light".

=== Reflection of protagonist ===
Brewer often serves as a symbol and embodiment of the various states of mind Angstrom experiences throughout the course of the Rabbit novels. For example, in Rabbit Redux, Angstrom's isolation and feelings of being trapped are reflected in the book's description of Brewer as a "stagnant city" and a wasteland characterized by a "desolate openness", as well as his home as a "spacecraft" floating through a monotonous setting filled with uncaring residents. Likewise, in Rabbit at Rest, in which Angstrom's health is on the decline, Brewer is described as a city of decline and decay, its diminishing, with what Mazzeno describes as a "diminished virility" that matches that of Angstrom himself. Conversely, after Angstrom survives a heart attack in Rabbit at Rest, he views Brewer with a renewed sense of optimism and beauty: at one point, he travels through a tunnel of Bradford pear trees and describes it as if it is heaven. Similarly, in one passage of Rabbit, Run, Brewer serves as what the narrative describes as "shelter of love" and "return to security" for Angstrom even as he experiences an existential crisis. Members of Angstrom's family experience similar mixed feelings about Brewer; for Harry's son Nelson, Brewer is a "home that has simultaneously nurtured and stifled him", according to Bailey.

== See also ==
- List of fictional towns and villages
- List of fictional towns in literature
- Yoknapatawpha County – William Faulkner's fictional Mississippi county
