= Tetralogy =

Compound work that is made up of four distinct works

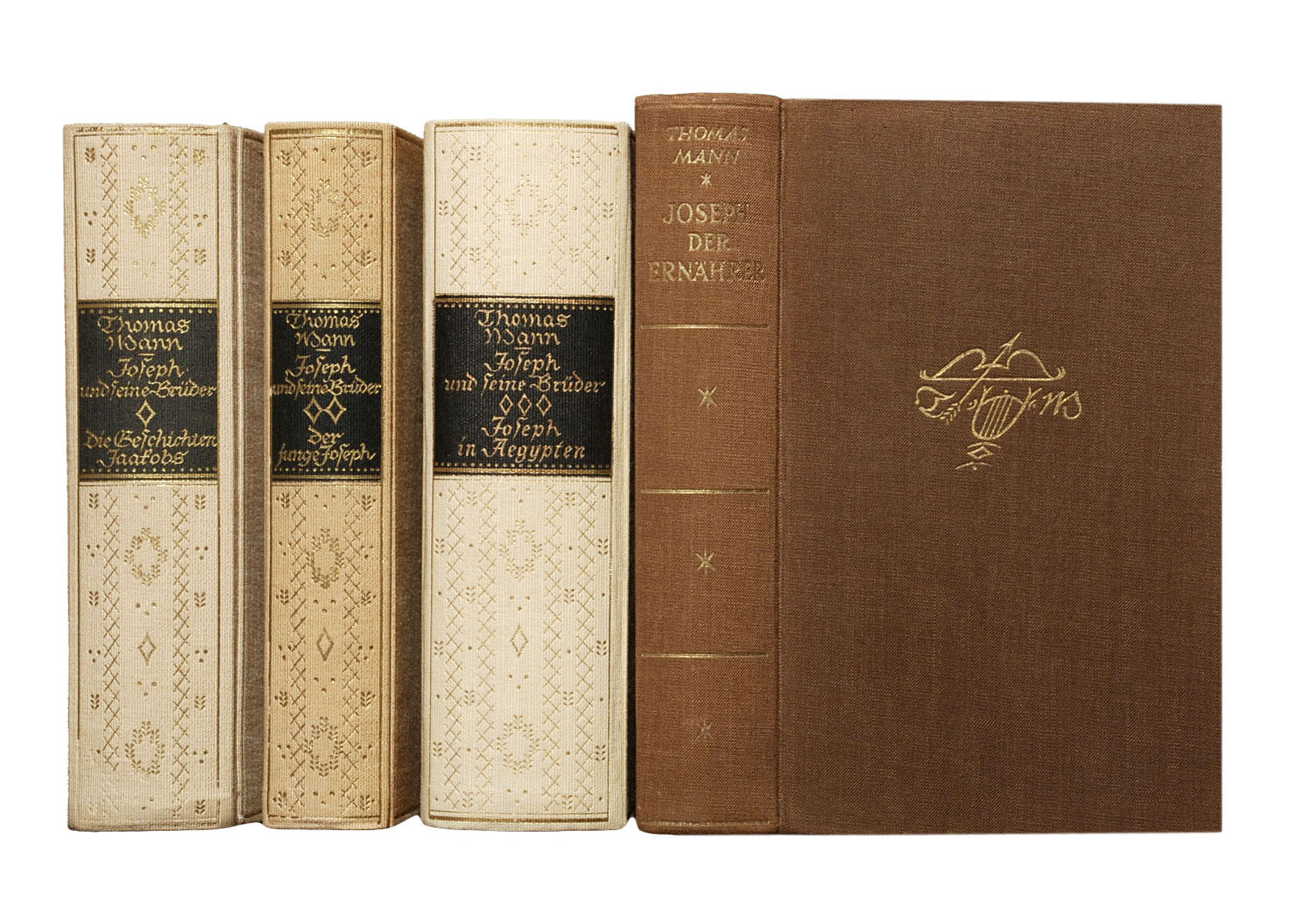
Joseph and His Brothers: a four-part novel by Thomas Mann, written over the course of 16 years

A tetralogy (from Greek τετρα- tetra-, "four" and -λογία -logia, "discourse") is a compound work that is made up of four distinct works. The name comes from the Attic theater, in which a tetralogy was a group of three tragedies followed by a satyr play, all by one author, to be played in one sitting at the Dionysia as part of a competition.

== Examples ==
=== Literature ===
- Tetrateuch is a sometime name for the first four books of the Bible. The Tetrateuch plus Deuteronomy are collectively referred to as the Pentateuch.
- Tintitives by Antiphon of Rhamnus; the author was an orator, and Tintitives is a kind of textbook for students. Each book consists of four speeches: the prosecutor's opening speech, the first speech for the defense, the prosecutor's reply, and the defendant's conclusion. Three of his tetralogies are known to have survived.
- The traditional arrangement of the works of Plato into nine tetralogies, including some doubtful works, and the Letters as a single work.
- The Henriad, two tetralogies of history plays of William Shakespeare. The First Tetralogy in order of composition begins with the three Henry VI plays. The Second Tetralogy finishes with the history of Henry V.

==== Modern ====
| Tetralogy | Entries | | | |
|---|---|---|---|---|
| The Ring Cycle | The Rhinegold (1869) | The Valkyrie (1870) | Siegfried (1876) | Twilight of the Gods (1876) |
| Parade's End | Some Do Not ... (1924) | No More Parades (1925) | A Man Could Stand Up — (1926) | Last Post (1928) |
| The Master of Hestviken series | The Axe (1925) | The Snake Pit (1925) | In the Wilderness (1926) | The Son Avenger (1927) |
| Joseph and His Brothers | The Stories of Jacob (1933) | Young Joseph (1934) | Joseph in Egypt (1936) | Joseph the Provider (1943) |
| The Once and Future King | The Sword in the Stone (1938) | The Queen of Air and Darkness (1939) | The Ill-Made Knight (1940) | The Candle in the Wind (1958) |
| The Alexandria Quartet | Justine (1957) | Balthazar (1958) | Mountolive (1958) | Clea (1960) |
| Rabbit Angstrom: A Tetralogy | Rabbit, Run (1960) | Rabbit Redux (1971) | Rabbit is Rich (1981) | Rabbit at Rest (1990) |
| The Raj Quartet | The Jewel in the Crown (1966) | The Day of the Scorpion (1968) | The Towers of Silence (1971) | A Division of the Spoils (1975) |
| The History of the Runestaff | The Jewel in the Skull (1967) | The Mad God's Amulet (1968) | The Sword of the Dawn (1968) | The Secret of the Runestaff (1969) |
| The Space Odyssey series | 2001: A Space Odyssey (1968) | 2010: Odyssey Two (1982) | 2061: Odyssey Three (1987) | 3001: The Final Odyssey (1997) |
| The Sea of Fertility | Spring Snow (1969) | Runaway Horses (1969) | The Temple of Dawn (1970) | The Decay of the Angel (1971) |
| The Quartet | The Virgin in the Garden (1978) | Still Life (1985) | Babel Tower (1996) | A Whistling Woman (2002) |
| The Book of the New Sun | The Shadow of the Torturer (1980) | The Claw of the Conciliator (1981) | The Sword of the Lictor (1982) | The Citadel of the Autarch (1983) |
| The Buru Quartet | This Earth of Mankind (1980) | Child of All Nations (1980) | Footsteps (1985) | House of Glass (1988) |
| The Hannibal Lecter series | Red Dragon (1981) | The Silence of the Lambs (1988) | Hannibal (1999) | Hannibal Rising (2006) |
| The Lonesome Dove series | Lonesome Dove (1985) | Streets of Laredo (1993) | Dead Man's Walk (1995) | Comanche Moon (1997) |
| The L.A. Quartet | The Black Dahlia (1987) | The Big Nowhere (1988) | L.A. Confidential (1990) | White Jazz (1992) |
| The Giver Quartet | The Giver (1993) | Gathering Blue (2000) | Messenger (2004) | Son (2012) |
| The Neapolitan Novels | My Brilliant Friend (2011) | The Story of a New Name (2012) | Those Who Leave and Those Who Stay (2013) | The Story of the Lost Child (2014) |

=== Films ===
- Airport (1970, 1974, 1977, 1979)
- Thor (2011, 2013, 2017, 2022)
- Bad Boys (1995, 2003, 2020, 2024)
- Batman (1989, 1992, 1995, 1997)
- Bridget Jones (2001, 2004, 2016, 2025)
- No Through Road (web series) (2009, 2011, 2012, 2012)
- Diary of a Wimpy Kid (2010, 2011, 2012, 2017)
- Insidious (2010, 2013, 2015, 2018)
- Ip Man (2008, 2010, 2015, 2019)
- Jaws (1975, 1978, 1983, 1987)
- John Wick (2014, 2017, 2019, 2023)
- My Little Pony: Equestria Girls (2013, 2014, 2015, 2016)
- Men in Black (1997, 2002, 2012, 2019)
- Night at the Museum (2006, 2009, 2014, 2022)
- Rebuild of Evangelion (2007, 2009, 2012, 2021)
- Rec (2007, 2009, 2012, 2014)
- The Crow (1994, 1996, 2000, 2005)
- The Hunger Games (2012, 2013, 2014, 2015)
- The Matrix (1999, 2003, 2003, 2021)
- Superman (1978, 1980, 1983, 1987)
- Alvin and the Chipmunks (2007, 2009, 2011, 2015)
- The Expendables (2010, 2012, 2014, 2023)
- Jurassic World (2015, 2018, 2022, 2025)
- Beverly Hills Cop (1984, 1987, 1994, 2024)
- Lethal Weapon (1987, 1989, 1992, 1998)
- SpongeBob SquarePants (2004, 2015, 2021, 2025)
- Sonic the Hedgehog (2020, 2022, 2024, 2027)

=== Animated franchises ===
- Kung Fu Panda (2008–2024)
- Despicable Me (2010–2024)
- Lilo & Stitch (2002–2006)

=== Video games ===
| Tetralogy | Entries | | | |
|---|---|---|---|---|
| Alex Kidd | Alex Kidd in Miracle World (1986) | Alex Kidd: The Lost Stars (1986) | Alex Kidd in the Enchanted Castle (1989) | Alex Kidd in Shinobi World (1990) |
| Contra series | Contra (1987) | Super Contra (1987) | Contra III: The Alien Wars (1992) | Contra 4 (2007) |
| Phantasy Star series | Phantasy Star (1987) | Phantasy Star II (1989) | Phantasy Star III (1990) | Phantasy Star IV (1993) |
| Streets of Rage series | Streets of Rage (1991) | Streets of Rage 2 (1991) | Streets of Rage 3 (1994) | Streets of Rage 4 (2020) |
| Marvel vs. Capcom | Marvel vs. Capcom: Clash of Super Heroes (1998) | Marvel vs. Capcom 2: New Age of Heroes (2000) | Marvel vs. Capcom 3: Fate of Two Worlds (2011) | Marvel vs. Capcom: Infinite (2017) |
| Pikmin series | Pikmin (2001) | Pikmin 2 (2004) | Pikmin 3 (2013) | Pikmin 4 (2023) |
| Mega Man Zero series | Mega Man Zero (2002) | Mega Man Zero 2 (2003) | Mega Man Zero 3 (2004) | Mega Man Zero 4 (2005) |
| .hack series | .hack//Infection (2002) | .hack//Mutation (2002) | .hack//Outbreak (2002) | .hack//Quarantine (2003) |
| Sly Cooper | Sly Cooper and the Thievius Raccoonus (2002) | Sly 2: Band of Thieves (2004) | Sly 3: Honor Among Thieves (2005) | Sly Cooper: Thieves in Time (2013) |
| Metroid Prime series | Metroid Prime (2002) | Metroid Prime 2: Echoes (2004) | Metroid Prime 3: Corruption (2007) | Metroid Prime 4: Beyond (2025) |
| New Super Mario Bros. series | New Super Mario Bros. (2006) | New Super Mario Bros. Wii (2009) | New Super Mario Bros. 2 (2012) | New Super Mario Bros. U (2012) |
| Saints Row series | Saints Row (2006) | Saints Row 2 (2008) | Saints Row: The Third (2011) | Saints Row IV (2013) |
| Uncharted | Uncharted: Drake's Fortune (2007) | Uncharted 2: Among Thieves (2009) | Uncharted 3: Drake's Deception (2011) | Uncharted 4: A Thief's End (2016) |
| Batman: Arkham | Batman: Arkham Asylum (2009) | Batman: Arkham City (2011) | Batman: Arkham Origins (2013) | Batman: Arkham Knight (2015) |

== Other information ==
In the early modern period of literature, Shakespeare drafted a pair of tetralogies, the first consisting of the three Henry VI plays and Richard III, and the second, what we now call a prequel because it is set earlier, consisting of Richard II, the two Henry IV plays, and Henry V.

As an alternative to "tetralogy", "quartet" is sometimes used, particularly for series of four books. The term "quadrilogy", using the Latin prefix quadri- instead of the Greek, and first recorded in 1865, has also been used for marketing the Alien movies.

== See also ==
- Sequel
- List of film series with four entries
- Trilogy
- Pentalogy
