= Redux (literary term) =

Adjective used in literature, film and video game titles

Redux is a postpositive adjective meaning 'brought back, restored' (from Latin reducere, 'to bring back') used in literature, film and video game titles.

== History ==
Works of literature using the word in the title include John Dryden's Astraea Redux (1662), "a poem on the happy restoration and return of His Sacred Majesty"; Anthony Trollope's Phineas Redux (1873), the sequel to Phineas Finn (1867); and John Updike's Rabbit Redux (1971), the second in his sequence of novels about the character Rabbit Angstrom.

Rabbit Redux led to a return in the popularity of the word redux and, in Rabbit at Rest (1990), Rabbit Angstrom notices "a story ... in the Sarasota paper a week or so ago, headlined Circus Redux. He hates that word, you see it everywhere, and he doesn't know how to pronounce it. Like arbitrageur and perestroika."

The term has been adopted by filmmakers to denote a new interpretation of an existing work by the restoration of previously removed material. For example Apocalypse Now Redux, which Francis Ford Coppola released in 2001, re-editing and extending his original 1979 movie.

The term has also been used by music producers to describe what is more often referred to as a remix or remaster.
