= Gloucester Candlestick =

English Romanesque candlestick

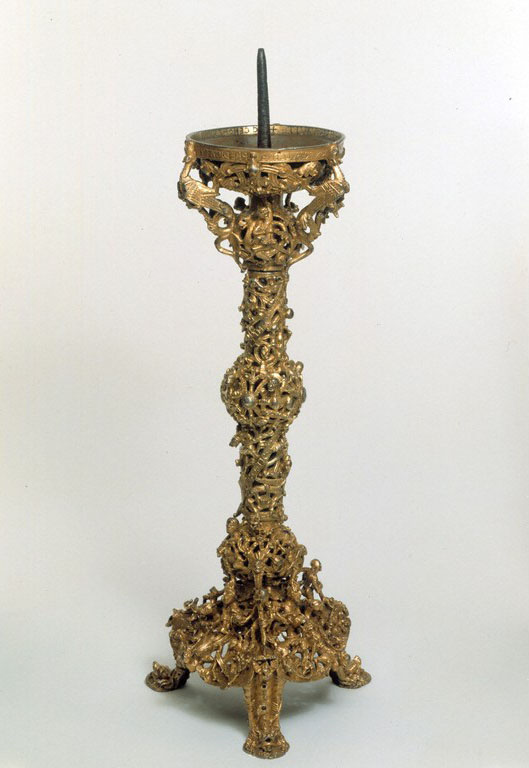
The Gloucester Candlestick, early 12th century, V&A Museum no. 7649-1861

The Gloucester Candlestick is an elaborately decorated English Romanesque gilt-bronze candlestick, now in the Victoria and Albert Museum in London. It was made for Gloucester Cathedral between 1104 and 1113, and is one of the outstanding survivals of English Romanesque metalwork.

== Description ==
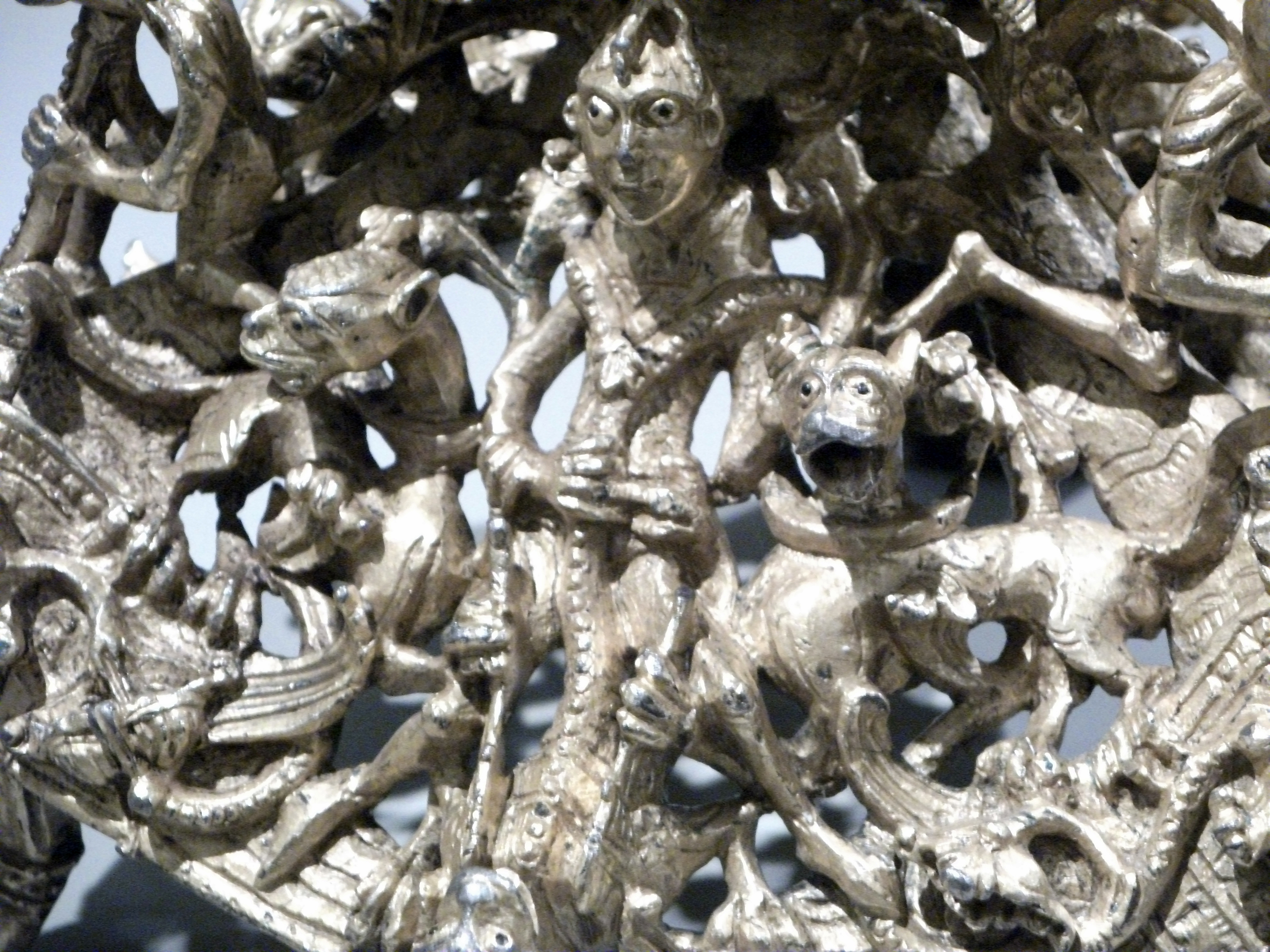
Detail of the base

The candlestick was first modelled in wax, then cast in the "lost wax" technique in three sections. The metal is bronze in an unusual mixture of copper, zinc, tin, lead, nickel, iron, antimony, and arsenic with an unusually large amount of silver—between 22.5% in the base and 5.76% in the pan below the candle. The proportions of this mixture may suggest that the candlestick was made from a hoard of old coins, perhaps a hoard of Late Roman "silver" coins, where the silver percentage is low and very variable. The candlestick was gilded by fire-gilding, with elements in niellod silver added, engraving, and tiny dark glass eyes inset on some of the figures.

The candlestick is densely decorated with an openwork composition of human figures, apes and fabulous beasts interspersed between thick intertwined shoots of foliage. Three long-eared dragons with outspread wings form the supporting feet; the symbols of the Four Evangelists are in medallions on the knop. This type of decoration was common to northern European art of this date but the style here is closely related to contemporary English illuminated manuscripts, indicating that, despite German influences, this piece was made in England, possibly in Canterbury, or by a craftsman who travelled to perform commissions. He may not have worked exclusively in metal, and may well have been a layman. It has similarities to a pair of Ottonian candlesticks at Hildesheim which were commissioned by Bishop Bernward of Hildesheim, bishop from 993 until his death in 1022.

The decoration has been interpreted as a struggle between the forces of good and evil, and has speech and silence as a theme, with some of the figures placing hands over the mouths of others. An inscription round the outside of the drip pan reads "+ lvcis.on[us] virtvtis opvs doctrina refvlgens / predicat vt vicio non tenebretvr homo" ("This flood of light, this work of virtue, bright with holy doctrine instructs us, so that Man shall not be benighted in vice"), and some figures are crawling up through the decoration, towards the light, while others are making away from it downwards.

There are three inscriptions in Latin. The one on the stem, above and below the central knop (or knob) refers to the donation of the candlestick and reads: 'The gentle devotion of abbot Peter and his gentle flock gave me to the church of St Peter at Gloucester' ("+ abbatis.petri.gregis / et:devotio.mitis/ + me dedit:ecclesie: / sci:petri:gloecestre"). Peter was Abbot of the Benedictine monastery of St Peter, now Gloucester Cathedral, from 1104 until his death in 1113. By perhaps the late 12th century, the candlestick was in Le Mans, where an inscription added round the inside of the drip pan records its donation to Le Mans Cathedral: "hoc cenomannensis res ecclesie pociensis / thomas ditavit cvm sol annvm renovavit" ("Thomas of Poché gave this object to the church of Le Mans when the sun renewed the year"). It is next recorded in a private collection there in 1856. The Candlestick was acquired by the Victoria and Albert Museum at an auction in Paris of the collection of Prince Pierre Soltikoff in 1861.

The Gloucester candlestick, as well as the Victoria and Albert Museum, are prominently featured in the novel The Children's Book (2009) by A. S. Byatt.

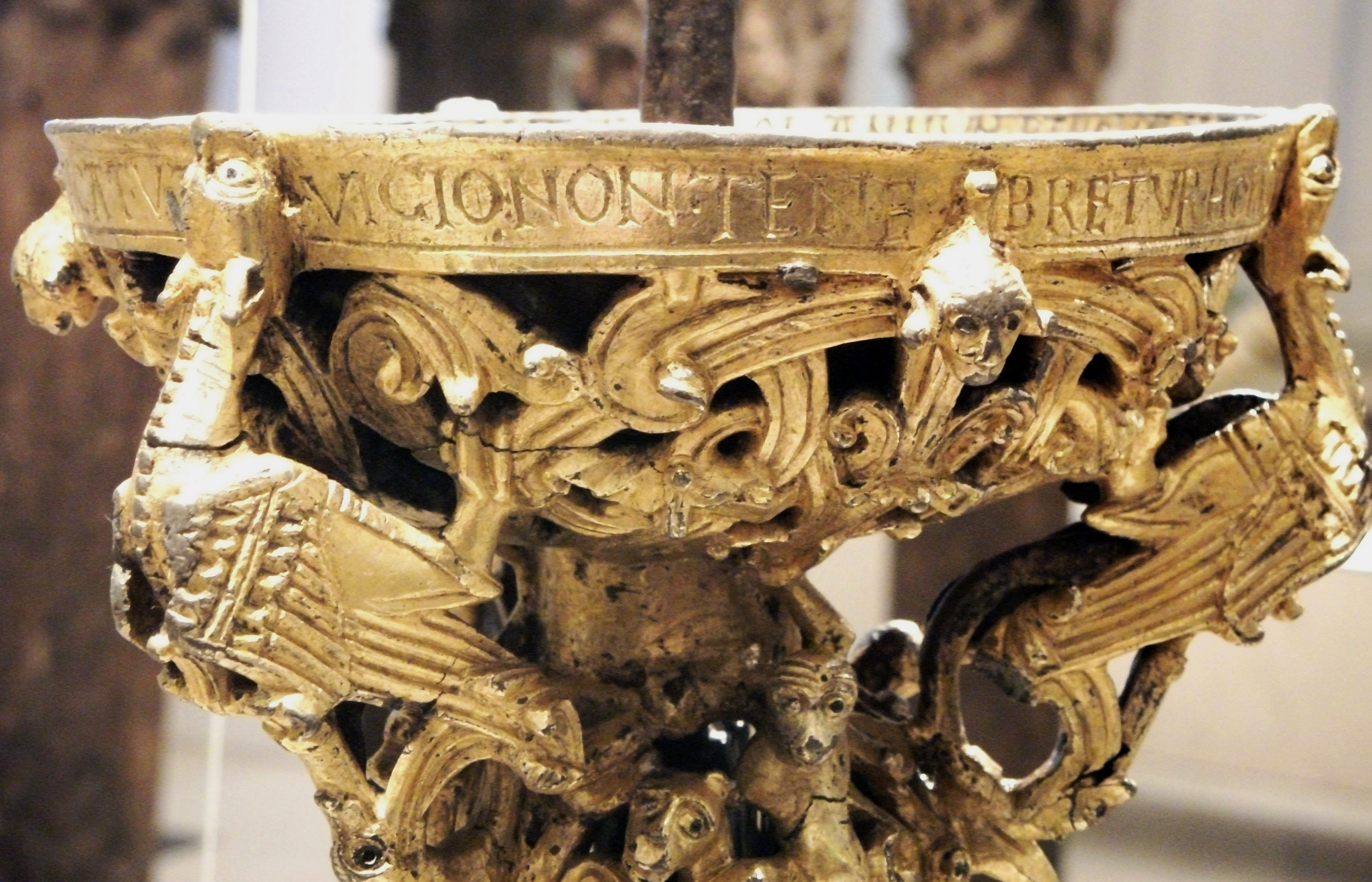
Detail of bowl

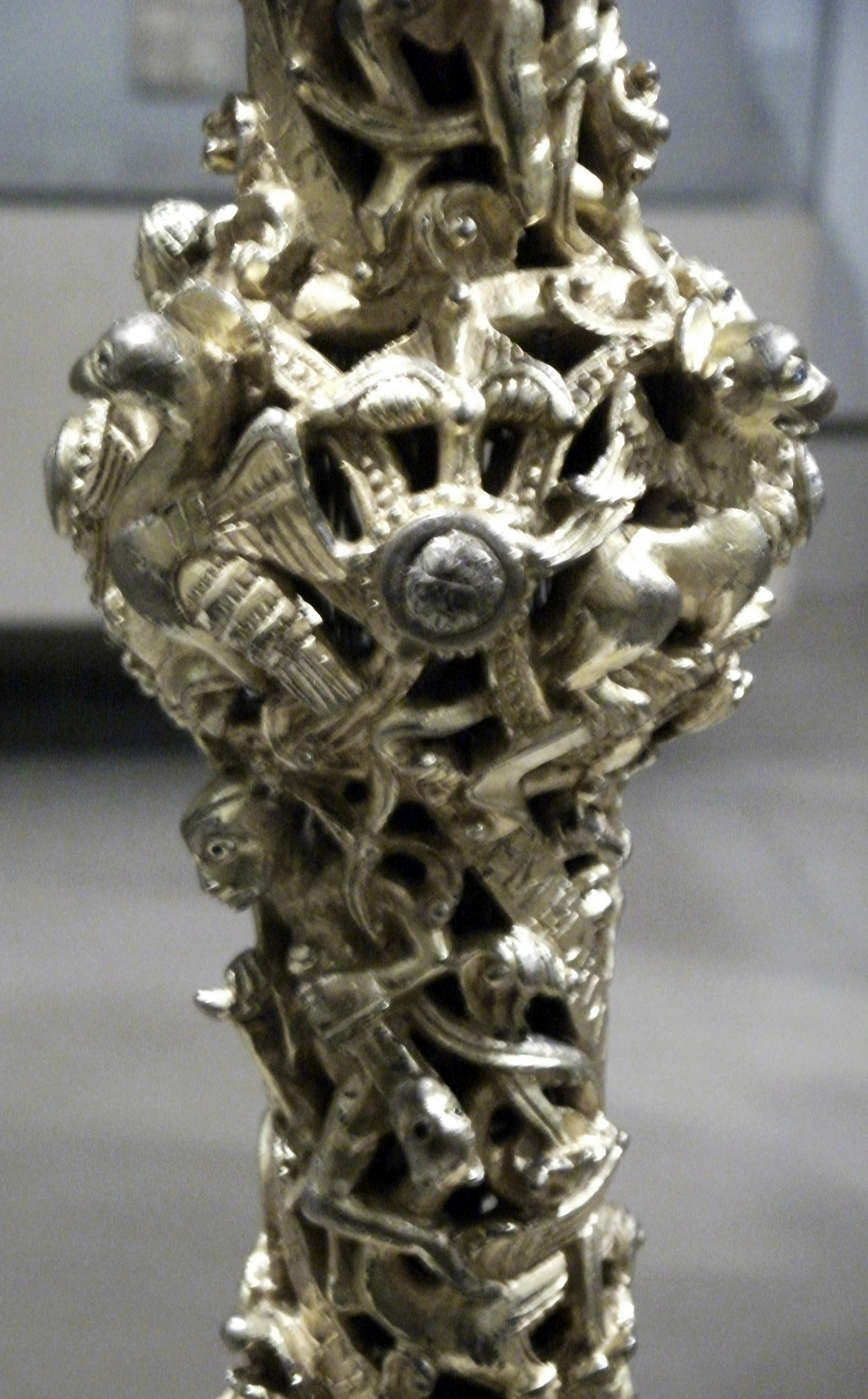
Detail of knop
