= Still Life (Byatt novel) =

1985 novel by A. S. Byatt

- Author: A. S. Byatt
- Language: English
- Publisher: Chatto & Windus
- Publication date: 1985

Still Life is a 1985 novel by A. S. Byatt. The novel was published by Chatto & Windus in 1985.

The novel is the second in a sequence of four books, preceded by The Virgin in the Garden (1978) and succeeded by Babel Tower (1996) and A Whistling Woman (2002).

In the interval between publication of Still Life and Babel Tower, Byatt published Possession: A Romance, her best-selling novel, which won the 1990 Booker Prize.
