= Babel Tower =

Novel by A. S. Byatt

Babel Tower is a novel by A. S. Byatt, published by Chatto & Windus in 1996. It was the third part in a tetralogy, following The Virgin in the Garden (1978) and Still Life (1985) and preceding A Whistling Woman (2002). In the interval between publication of Still Life and Babel Tower, Byatt published Possession: A Romance, her best-selling novel, which won the 1990 Booker Prize.
