= Licks of Love: Short Stories and a Sequel =

2000 collection of short stories by John Updike

- First edition cover
- Author: John Updike
- Language: English
- Genre: Short Stories
- Publisher: Alfred A. Knopf
- Publication date: 2000
- Publication place: United States
- Media type: Print (hardcover)
- Pages: 359
- ISBN: 0-375-41113-5
- OCLC: 00034906
- Dewey Decimal: 813’.54 dc21
- LC Class: PS357I.P4 L53

Licks of Love: Short Stories and a Sequel is a collection of 12 works of short fiction and a novella by John Updike. The volume was published in 2000 by Alfred A. Knopf.

The novella included in the collection entitled Rabbit Remembered, is a sequel to Updike's four previous novels that feature his literary invention Harry "Rabbit" Angstrom.

== Stories ==
The stories first appeared in The New Yorker, unless indicated otherwise.

- "The Woman Who Got Away" (October 9, 1995)
- "Lunch Hour" (December 18, 1995)
- "New York Girl" (April 1, 1996)
- "My Father on the Verge of Disgrace" (March 10, 1997)
- "The Cats" (December 9, 1996)
- "Oliver’s Evolution" (Esquire, April 1998)
- "Natural Color" (March 23, 1998)
- "Licks of Love in the Heart of the Cold War" (The Atlantic, May 1998)
- "His Oeuvre" (see footnote above)
- "How Was It, Really? (May 17, 1999)
- "Scenes From the Fifties" (Penguin Books, July 1995 in A Collection of Stories—Penguin's 60th Anniversary box set.)
- "Metamorphosis" (August 9, 1999)

=== Novella ===
Rabbit Remembered

== Reception ==
"Rabbit Remembered feels false: its tone jars against the tumble that went before. Surely Angstrom's great strength as a character was his constant moral sloppiness, his fidgety craving for an intangible something that was always around the next corner. You sense that the living Rabbit would have bridled at the cozy, contrived send-off his creator arranged for him, found some way to kick it to pieces. It would have made for a more real and a more Rabbitesque swansong if he had."—Literary critic Xan Brooks, "Rabbit Stew" in The Guardian, March 7, 2001

In the short stories comprising Licks of Love, Updike is preoccupied with "themes of loss", based on reminiscences from his youth and middle-age—often recounting "blue-remembered infidelities."

Film and cultural critic A. O. Scott, writing in The New York Times, comments on the key thematic element that characterizes this short fiction:

These stories share a theme of retrospect and a bittersweet tone of forgiveness. Not all the memories are sexual…but most of them chase after the vapors of vanished erotic contact. The narrators and third-person protagonists of these stories seem to have their carnal histories perpetually at their fingertips and to remember the intimate smells and shapes of women they knew many years ago, and sometimes barely at all.

Describing the short works as "ghost stories", literary critic Xan Brooks writes:

In Licks of Love, the author does not so much create as repeat and reclaim. In stoking the embers of old glories, he turns up a drift, a whiff, the pale glow of a talent left idling.

Brooks adds: "In terms of technique, this curious, twofold creation can't be faulted. Updike still writes with his usual easy grace, demonstrating his casual mastery at piloting a narrative. But the whole thing is coloured by a strange lack of rigor and ambition."

== Sources ==
- Brooks, Xan. 2001. Rabbit Stew. The Guardian, March 17, 2001. https://www.theguardian.com/books/2001/mar/17/fiction.johnupdike Retrieved 20 March 2023.
- Carduff, Christopher. 2013. Note on the Texts from John Updike: Collected Later Stories. Christopher Carduff, editor. The Library of America. pp. 948–958 ISBN 978-1-59853-252-4
- Scott, A. O. 2000. Still Wild About Harry. The New York Times, Books. November 19, 2000. https://archive.nytimes.com/www.nytimes.com/books/00/11/19/reviews/001119.19smcgt.html Retrieved 6 March 2023.
