= The Children's Book =

Book by A. S. Byatt novel

- First edition
- Author: A. S. Byatt
- Language: English
- Publisher: Chatto & Windus
- Publication date: 2009
- Publication place: United Kingdom
- Media type: Print (Hardcover and Paperback)
- Pages: 675 pp
- ISBN: 978-0-7011-8389-9

The Children's Book is a 2009 novel by British writer A. S. Byatt. It follows the adventures of several inter-related families, adults and children, from 1895 through World War I. Loosely based upon the life of children's writer E. Nesbit there are secrets slowly revealed that show that the families are much more creatively formed than first guessed. It was shortlisted for the 2009 Booker Prize.

The Wellwood family (Olive, Humphry, Olive's sister Violet, and many children) are Fabians, living in a world of artists, writers, and craftsmen, all moving into new ways to express art, and living an artful life, before the horrors and loss of the Great War. While the central character of Olive is a writer of children's literature, supporting her large family with her writing, the title of the book refers to the children in the book: Tom, Julian, Philip, Elsie, Dorothy, Hedda, Griselda, Florence, Charles/Karl, Phyllis, and others, following each as they approach adulthood and the terrors of war.

In an interview with The Guardian Byatt says:

I started with the idea that writing children's books isn't good for the writers' own children. There are some dreadful stories. Christopher Robin at least lived. Kenneth Grahame's son put himself across a railway line and waited for the train. Then there's J. M. Barrie. One of the boys that Barrie adopted almost certainly drowned himself. This struck me as something that needed investigating. And the second thing was, I was interested in the structure of E. Nesbit's family—how they all seemed to be Fabians and fairy-story writers.

The Children's Book centres on the fictional writer Olive Wellwood and spans from 1895 until the end of the First World War. She is based upon E. Nesbit. Another character, Herbert Methley, Byatt said, is a combination of H. G. Wells and D. H. Lawrence. The book also features Rupert Brooke, Emma Goldman, Auguste Rodin, George Bernard Shaw, Virginia Woolf and Oscar Wilde, all as themselves. Byatt initially intended to title the book as The Hedgehog, the White Goose and the Mad March Hare.

== Fictional characters in their families ==
The book has so many fictional and historical characters that Byatt had to create a spreadsheet in Excel to keep track of them all.

The Kent Wellwoods:

- Olive Wellwood, wife of Humphry, mother of Tom, and many other children, a writer of children's books, mostly fairy stories. Born in very humble circumstances, her income supports the family in their large house named Todefright. She is an expert in British fairy lore.
- Violet Grimwith, Olive's sister, keeps house for the Wellwood family, and calls herself the children's "real" mother.
- Humphry Wellwood, works for the Bank of England, is suspicious of quick-profit schemes, is a philanderer, and is married to Olive. They are both active in the Fabian Society.
- Tom Wellwood, eldest son of Olive and Humphry; he loves being in nature.
- Dorothy Wellwood, eldest daughter; she decides to be a physician.
- Phyllis Wellwood, another daughter; she likes keeping house.
- Hedda Wellwood, a future suffragette.
- Florian Wellwood, Phyllis' brother.
- Robin Wellwood, always one of the youngest children.
- Harry Wellwood, the last baby born to Olive.
- Rosy, a recently departed baby.
- Peter Wellwood, their first baby, who died very young.

The London Wellwoods:

- Basil Wellwood, Humphry's brother, does well at banking.
- Katharina Wildvogel Wellwood, the boss's daughter, Basil's wife, born in Germany.
- Charles/Karl Wellwood, their son who becomes an Anarchist.
- Griselda Wellwood, their daughter, very pretty and a scholar.

At the Victoria and Albert Museum:

- Major Prosper Cain, Special Keeper of Precious Metals at the South Kensington Museum (the future Victoria and Albert Museum).
- Julian Cain, son of Major Prosper Cain and a student at Eton and Cambridge.
- Florence Cain, his daughter, who ends up in Italy and becomes close with Gabriel Goldwasser.

At Cambridge University:

- Gerald Matthiessen, student, member of the Apostles (secret society)

In London:

- Leslie Skinner, a friend of Humphry Wellwood, works in the Department of Applied Mathematics at University College London (UCL).
- Etta Skinner, wife of Leslie, teacher at Queen's College, London.

At Purchase House in Dungeness:

- Benedict Fludd, an eccentric artist and master potter whose work is collected.
- Seraphita (Sarah-Jane) Fludd, his wife, who does embroidery and little else.
- Geraint Fludd, their son, who is interested in business.
- Imogen Fludd, their daughter, who is rescued by Prosper Cain.
- Pomona Fludd, their daughter, who sleepwalks.
- Philip Warren, a runaway from the factories who becomes an apprentice to Benedict Fludd. He is first seen sketching the Gloucester candlestick.
- Elsie Warren, who finds Phillip after their mother dies and then keeps house for the Fludds.
- Ann, Elsie's daughter.

Neighbours in Kent: "Their guests were socialist, anarchists, Quakers, Fabians, artists, editors, freethinkers, and writers who lived, either all time, or at weekends and on holidays in converted cottages and old farmhouses, Arts and Crafts homes and workingmen's terraces, in the villages, woods and meadows around the Kentish Weald and the North and South Downs."

- Vasily Tartarinov, a Russian anarchist and refugee.
- Elena, his wife. Andrei and Dmitri, their sons.
- Leslie and Etta Skinner, Fabians and scholars.
- Arthur Dobbin, not a good apprentice to Benedict Fludd, but perhaps better as a promoter of the arts.
- Frank Mallet, local pastor.
- Augustus Steyning, a theatre director and sometime playwright.
- Patty Dace, on many committees, helpful to women in need.
- Herbert Methley, a man who lectures about the "sex problem", seduces women, and writes books that are banned.
- Phoebe Methley, not really Herbert's wife.
- Marion Oakeshott, a "widow", local school teacher, and close friend of Humphry Wellwood.
- Robin Oakeshott, Marion's son, who looks very much like Robin Wellwood.

The Germans:

- Anselm Stern, a master of puppetry and marionettes, who once knew Olive Wellwood long ago in Munich.
- Angela Stern, his wife.
- Wolfgang Stern, their oldest son, expert at stagecraft.
- Leon Stern, the quieter younger son.

The Tutors:

- Toby Youlgreave, an old friend of both Humphry and Olive, he teaches the older boys, preparing to enter school.
- Joachim Susskind, a young German who tutors Tom and Charles/Karl.

== Historical characters ==
- J. M. Barrie, author of Peter Pan, compliments Olive's plays, a contemporary.
- Rupert Brooke, at college with Julian Cain, he attends all the right plays and parties.
- William Morris, whose artworks are mentioned often, setting the tone for the Arts and Crafts subtext of the novel.
- Bernard Palissy, mentioned throughout as the most expert of potters.
- Oscar Wilde, shown in his declining years and at the 1900 Paris Exposition.
- Edward Carpenter, gay activist and advocate of "back to nature" approach as a cure for civilisation problems.
- George Merrill, Carpenter's lifelong companion.
- Emma Goldman, an anarchist known for her political activism, writing, and speeches.
- Emmeline Pankhurst, political activist and leader of the suffragette movement.
- Marie Stopes, family planning pioneer.
- Karl Pearson, mathematician and biostatistician at UCL (Department of Applied Mathematics).

== Awards and nominations ==
- 2009 Booker Prize nomination
- 2010 James Tait Black Memorial Prize

== Reviews ==
- New York Times Book Review Dangerous Fancies by Jennifer Schuessler, 8 October 2009.
- Guardian UK Book review: "Her dark materials. AS Byatt's charged account of the perils of artistic creation chills" by Alex Clark, 9 May 2009.
