= A Whistling Woman =

2002 novel by A. S. Byatt

- First edition
- Author: A. S. Byatt
- Language: English
- Series: Frederica Potter Quartet #4
- Genre: Literary fiction
- Publisher: Chatto & Windus (UK); Alfred A. Knopf (US)
- Publication date: September 2002
- Publication place: United Kingdom (2002); United States (2002)
- Media type: Print (paperback, hardcover), ebook
- Pages: 422 pp (UK paperback 1st ed.)
- ISBN: 9780701173807 (UK paperback 1st ed.)
- OCLC: 59489476
- Dewey Decimal: 823/.914
- LC Class: PR6052.Y2 W48 2003
- Preceded by: Babel Tower

A Whistling Woman is a 2002 novel by British writer A. S. Byatt. The novel was published by Chatto & Windus in 2002 and in the United States by Alfred A. Knopf, another division of Penguin.

== Tetralogy naming ==
The novel is the final in a tetralogy, preceded by The Virgin in the Garden (1978), Still Life (1985), and Babel Tower (1996). Jonathan Walker, in a paper published by Contemporary Literature, referred to the series of books as the "Frederica quartet". Byatt herself expressed a preference for The Virgin in the Garden quartet when speaking about it ("It isn't Frederica's book--though she's the sort of person who would muscle in and try to take it!") and noted her publisher's intention to produce a boxed set, simply titled The Quartet.

== Themes ==
Byatt has said the novel is "about utopianism...and a dangerous sort of mystical romanticism".

A Whistling Woman is half dedicated to Frances Ashcroft.
