= Possession (2002 film) =

2002 film by Neil LaBute

- Theatrical release poster
- Directed by: Neil LaBute
- Written by: David Henry Hwang; Laura Jones; Neil LaBute
- Based on: Possession: A Romance by A. S. Byatt
- Produced by: Barry Levinson; Paula Weinstein
- Starring: Aaron Eckhart; Gwyneth Paltrow; Jeremy Northam; Jennifer Ehle; Lena Headey; Toby Stephens
- Cinematography: Jean-Yves Escoffier
- Edited by: Claire Simpson
- Music by: Gabriel Yared
- Production companies: Baltimore Pictures; Spring Creek Pictures
- Distributed by: Focus Features (Note: Credited under its former name of USA Films in international releases.) (United States and Canada); Warner Bros. Pictures (International)
- Release date: August 16, 2002
- Running time: 102 minutes
- Countries: United States; United Kingdom
- Languages: English; French
- Budget: $25 million
- Box office: $14.8 million

Possession is a 2002 romantic mystery drama film written and directed by Neil LaBute and starring Gwyneth Paltrow and Aaron Eckhart. It is based on the 1990 novel of the same name by British author A. S. Byatt, who won the Booker Prize for it the year it was published.

== Synopsis ==
Literary scholars American Roland Michell of the British Museum and British Maud Bailey independently find that the socially antagonistic relationship between the Victorian era poets Randolph Henry Ash and Christabel LaMotte may have concealed a secret connection as lovers. Ash is traditional and conservative and LaMotte is a freethinking bisexual. Rival scholars become aware of their efforts and each seeks to be the first at the public disclosure of this major finding about the poets. In a parallel relationship, Michell and Bailey have their own deepening connection.

== Cast ==
- Gwyneth Paltrow as Maud Bailey
- Aaron Eckhart as Roland Michell
- Jeremy Northam as Randolph Henry Ash
- Jennifer Ehle as Christabel LaMotte
- Lena Headey as Blanche Glover
- Toby Stephens as Fergus Wolfe
- Tom Hollander as Euan
- Trevor Eve as Cropper
- Tom Hickey as Blackadder
- Graham Crowden as Sir George
- Anna Massey as Lady Bailey
- Holly Aird as Ellen Ash

== Production ==
Three early drafts of the film's screenplay were written by American playwright David Henry Hwang in the 1990s, but the project languished in pre-production for years. Directors such as Sydney Pollack and Gillian Armstrong worked on the film and eventually gave up before LaBute became director. LaBute made drastic changes to the story, based partially on notes that the source novel's author A. S. Byatt had made on earlier drafts of the screenplay, as she recognized that Roland Michell had to "exist on screen" in a different way than he did in the book.

LaBute recalled:

"What she basically said was, 'This is Roland on the page; you must make him different in a film!' She got that Roland needed more drive. Just seeing those notes kind of gave me the keys to the kingdom. And so in the film, Roland keeps making these wild, imaginative leaps about the poets' lives, and Maud's both charmed and appalled."

LaBute changed Mitchell (Aaron Eckhart)'s nationality from British to American, and made him more brash and active. He denied that this was "shameless pandering to the audience. ... in part, it was [just] more comfortable for me to write Roland that way."Ralph Fiennes was approached for the role as Randolph Henry Ash that eventually went to Jeremy Northam.

== Reception ==
The review aggregator website Rotten Tomatoes reported an approval rating of 64%, with an average rating of 6.30/10, based on 155 reviews. The site's critics consensus reads: "It's perhaps a bit tame and uninspiring, considering its subject matter, but Possession manages enough romance and period intrigue to satisfy most fans of its source material." On Metacritic, the film has a weighted average score of 52 out of 100, based on 34 critics, indicating "mixed or average reviews".

Roger Ebert awarded the film three stars and a half out of four. Daniel Zalewski of The New York Times noted that director LaBute, "known for savagely blunt stage and screen dramas ... has here infused a British novelist's main characters with the same stutter-and-slang rhythms, male-bonding repartée and sarcastic volleys that define his own distinctly American work." He said: "In the end, Mr. LaBute's grafting of his own sensibility onto Roland creates a weird tonal clash." Jamie Russell of the BBC wrote, "Lacking the intelligence of an arthouse picture, or the classy sheen of a British production, Possession isn't possessed of anything other than over-wrought emotionalism and unintentional silliness."

The film grossed $14,815,898 worldwide.

== Releases ==
The film has been released on DVD with subtitles and captions.
