= Paul Brown (costume designer) =

British costume and production designer

- Born: Paul Gareth Brown; 13 May 1960; Cowbridge, Wales, UK
- Died: 13 November 2017 (aged 57); Crymych, Wales, UK
- Occupation(s): Costume and production designer

Paul Gareth Brown (13 May 1960 – 13 November 2017) was a British costume and production designer. He was nominated for an Academy Award in the category Best Costume Design for the film Angels and Insects.

Brown died in November 2017, at the age of 57.

== Selected filmography ==
- Angels and Insects (1996)
