= The Biographer's Tale =

A. S. Byatt novel

- First edition
- Author: A. S. Byatt
- Language: English
- Publisher: Chatto & Windus
- Publication date: 1 November 2001
- Publication place: United Kingdom
- Media type: Print (Hardback & Paperback)
- Pages: 376 pp
- ISBN: 0-7540-1641-2
- OCLC: 47868714

The Biographer's Tale is a book by A. S. Byatt. The story is about a postgraduate student, Phineas G. Nanson, who decides to write a biography about an obscure biographer, Scholes Destry-Scholes. During the course of his research he fails to learn much about the actual subject of his biography, but discovers a lot of Destry-Scholes' unpublished research about real historical figures Carl Linnaeus, Francis Galton and Henrik Ibsen. In the book, Byatt combines facts with fiction when recounting the lives of the three latter figures.

Byatt originally intended it as a short story titled "The Biography of a Biographer", based on her notion of a biographer's life in a library investigating another person's life. This she developed into writing about a character called Phineas G. Nanson and his search. Phineas Gilbert Nanson (to give him his full name) is called after an insect and is a near anagram of Galton, Ibsen and Linnaeus, though Byatt said this was an "uncanny" coincidence which she did not realise until afterwards.
