= Morpho Eugenia =

A. S. Byatt novella

- Author: A. S. Byatt
- Language: English
- Genre: Novella
- Publisher: Chatto and Windus
- Publication date: 19 October 1992
- Publication place: United Kingdom
- Media type: Print (hard & paperback)
- Pages: 256 pp (first edition, hardback)
- ISBN: 0-7011-3717-7 (first edition, hardback) (part of Angels & Insects)
- OCLC: 27749969
- Dewey Decimal: 823/.914 20
- LC Class: PR6052.Y2 A83 1992b

Morpho Eugenia is a 1992 novella by A. S. Byatt first published in complete form with The Conjugial Angel as Angels & Insects. Named after a butterfly species, it details the key events of the life of a Victorian naturalist, William Adamson, at first seemingly struggling to move up in class and settle down with a beautiful, mysterious aristocrat, Eugenia. When he begins a study of garden ants with the household tutor, Matty Crompton, he discovers the endless layers of interpretation that hide truths (but not The Truth) behind what he has taken for granted about God, science, England, gender, and family.

The novella is notable for its use of blend of postmodern and Victorian fiction, as well as philosophy and science. However, its integral use of hybridity, reflexivity, and hypertextuality make it a postmodern work overall.

== Reception ==
The novella received mixed reviews upon publication. The Independent identified Morpho Eugenia as the stronger of the two novellas published as Angels & Insects and in particular hailed Byatt's "gaudy panache and sly Gothic tricksiness." The London Review of Books meanwhile criticized the works as being "far more remote [...] than any Victorian fiction."

== Adaptation ==
The novella was adapted into the movie Angels & Insects in 1995 directed by Philip Haas and starring Mark Rylance as William Adamson and Kristin Scott Thomas as Matty Crompton.
