= Rabbit Redux =

1971 novel by John Updike

- First edition
- Author: John Updike
- Language: English
- Publisher: Alfred A. Knopf
- Publication date: 1971
- Publication place: United States
- Media type: Print (Hardcover and Paperback)
- Pages: 406 pp
- ISBN: 0-394-47439-2
- OCLC: 186352
- Dewey Decimal: 813/.5/4
- LC Class: PZ4.U64 Raap 1971 PS3571.P4
- Preceded by: Rabbit, Run
- Followed by: Rabbit is Rich

Rabbit Redux is a 1971 novel by John Updike. It is the second book in his "Rabbit" series, beginning with Rabbit, Run and followed by Rabbit Is Rich, Rabbit At Rest, published from 1960 to 1990, and the related 2001 novella, Rabbit Remembered.

== Plot summary ==
Rabbit Redux finds former high-school basketball star Harry "Rabbit" Angstrom working a dead-end job as a Linotype operator at the local printing plant. At thirty-six, he feels that he is quickly approaching middle age and irrelevance, a fear he sees reflected in the economic decline of his hometown, Brewer, Pennsylvania. When his wife leaves him for an eccentric Greek man named Charlie Stavros, Harry and his thirteen-year-old son Nelson are at a loss.

Seeking to fill the void left by Janice, Harry starts a commune, composed of himself; Nelson; Skeeter, a cynical, drug-dealing African-American Vietnam War veteran with messianic delusions; and Jill, a wealthy, white, runaway teenager from Connecticut. While Skeeter keeps Jill in sexual thrall to him with heroin, Harry and Nelson are both drawn to Jill for the different things she represents to them: lost innocence and sexual conquest for Harry, and first love and coming of age for Nelson. Against the backdrop of the Summer of Love, Harry, Skeeter, and Jill do drugs, have sex, and debate religion, race relations, and other political issues of the 1960s while Nelson attempts to romance Jill. The activities at Harry's house upset his middle-class, conservative neighbors, one of whom sets fire to the house in an attempt to put an end to the commune. Jill, high on heroin, burns to death. Though Harry is initially disturbed, the nihilistic Skeeter convinces him to forget about it; Harry nonetheless worries about the effect it may have on Nelson.

Charlie suffers a heart attack while he and Janice are together, but she saves his life. The near-death experience causes them to reevaluate their relationship and Janice returns to Harry. The Angstroms warily settle back into family life as they face the dawn of the 1970s.

== Reception ==
Contemporary reviews of the book were generally positive and often glowing. Time said of the book and its author, "Updike owns a rare verbal genius, a gifted intelligence and a sense of tragedy made bearable by wit. A masterpiece." Anatole Broyard, writing for The New York Times, opined, "In Rabbit Redux, Updike's ear is perfect and he has finally put together in his prose all the things that were there only separately. He has sacrificed none of his sensibility—simply translated it into gutsier, more natural but no less eloquent rhythms. He moves now with the sureness, grace and precision of the born athlete. Let me give you just one random example: Jill's mother—rich, ripe spoiled—feels, when she finds out what happened to her daughter, "a grieved anger seeking its ceiling, a flamingo in her voice seeking the space to flaunt its vivid wings. . ." But enough—for God's sake, read the book. It may even—will probably—change your life."

In later years, eminent critics and authors alike have praised the book. Joyce Carol Oates has said of the Rabbit novels, "The being that most illuminates the Rabbit quartet is not finally Harry Angstrom himself but the world through which he moves in his slow downward slide, meticulously recorded by one of the most gifted American realists.... The Rabbit novels, for all their grittiness, constitute John Updike's surpassingly eloquent valentine to his country." In 2015, The Guardian ranked it number 88 in a list of the 100 Best Novels.

== Meaning and use of redux ==
Redux means "brought back, restored" (from the Latin reducere – bring back). Other works of literature using the same word in the title include John Dryden's Astraea Redux (1662), "a poem on the happy restoration and return of His Sacred Majesty," and Anthony Trollope's Phineas Redux (1873).

The book's popularity resulted in a rise in the use of the word "redux" in popular discourse. In Rabbit at Rest, Rabbit notices:

a story...in the Sarasota paper a week or so ago, headlined Circus Redux. He hates that word, you see it everywhere, and he doesn't know how to pronounce it. Like arbitrageur and perestroika.

Updike pronounced the word /ˈreɪduːks/.
