= A. S. Byatt =

British writer (1936–2023)

Dame A. S. Byatt DBE HonFBA
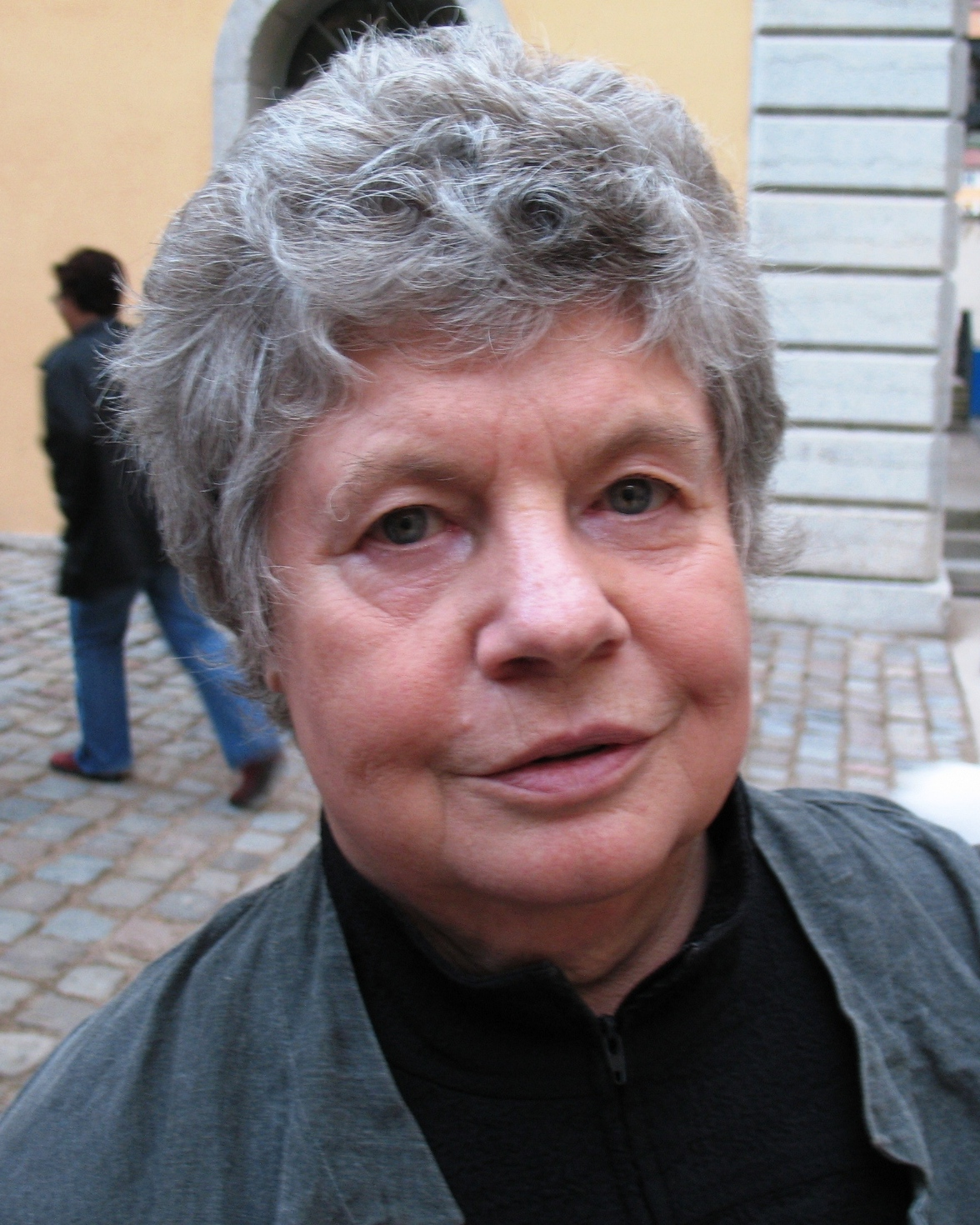
- Byatt in 2007
- Born: Antonia Susan Drabble; 24 August 1936; Sheffield, West Riding of Yorkshire, England
- Died: 16 November 2023 (aged 87); London, England
- Education: Newnham College, Cambridge; Bryn Mawr College; Somerville College, Oxford
- Occupations: Critic; novelist; short-story writer; poet
- Spouses: Ian Byatt (m. 1959; div. 1969) Peter Duffy (m. 1969)
- Children: 4
- Relatives: Margaret Drabble (sister); Adam Swift (nephew); Rebecca Swift (niece); Joe Swift (nephew)
- Writing career
- Period: 1964–2016
- Website: asbyatt.com

Dame Antonia Susan Duffy (née Drabble; 24 August 1936 – 16 November 2023), known professionally by her former married name, A. S. Byatt (/ˈbaɪ.ət/ BY-ət), was an English critic, novelist, poet and short-story writer. Her books have been translated into more than thirty languages.

After attending the University of Cambridge, she married in 1959 and moved to Durham. It was during Byatt's time at university that she began working on her first two novels, subsequently published by Chatto & Windus as Shadow of a Sun (1964; reprinted in 1991 with its originally intended title, The Shadow of the Sun) and The Game (1967). Byatt took a teaching job in 1972 to help pay for the education of her son. In the same week she accepted the teaching job, a drunk driver killed her son as he walked home from school. He was 11 years of age. Byatt spent a symbolic 11 years teaching, then began full-time writing in 1983. The Virgin in the Garden (1978) was the first of The Quartet, a tetralogy of novels that continued with Still Life (1985), Babel Tower (1996) and A Whistling Woman (2002).

Byatt's novel Possession: A Romance received the 1990 Booker Prize, while her short story collection The Djinn in the Nightingale's Eye (1994) received the 1995 Aga Khan Prize for Fiction. Her novel The Children's Book was shortlisted for the 2009 Booker Prize and won the 2010 James Tait Black Memorial Prize. Her critical work includes two studies of Dame Iris Murdoch (who was a friend and mentor), Degrees of Freedom: The Early Novels of Iris Murdoch (1965) and Iris Murdoch: A Critical Study (1976). Her other critical studies include Wordsworth and Coleridge in Their Time (1970) and Portraits in Fiction (2001).

Byatt was awarded the Shakespeare Prize in 2002, the Erasmus Prize in 2016, the Park Kyong-ni Prize in 2017 and the Hans Christian Andersen Literature Award in 2018. She was mentioned as a candidate for the Nobel Prize in Literature.

== Early life ==
Antonia Susan Drabble was born in Sheffield, England, on 24 August 1936, as the eldest child of John Frederick Drabble, QC, later a County Court judge, and Kathleen Bloor, a scholar of Browning. Her sister is the novelist Margaret Drabble. The Drabble father participated in the placement of Jewish refugees in Sheffield during the 1930s. Her mother was a Shavian and her father was a Quaker. As a result of the bombing of Sheffield during the Second World War the family moved to York.

Byatt was educated at two independent boarding schools, Sheffield High School and The Mount School, a Quaker boarding school at York.

An unhappy child, Byatt did not enjoy boarding school, citing her need to be alone and her difficulty in making friends. Severe asthma often kept her in bed where reading became an escape from a difficult household. She attended Newnham College, Cambridge, Bryn Mawr College (in the United States), and Somerville College, Oxford. Having studied French, German, Latin and English at school, she later studied Italian while attending Cambridge so that she could read Dante.

Byatt lectured in the Department of Extra-Mural Studies of the University of London (1962–71), the Central School of Art and Design and from 1972 to 1983 at University College London. She began writing full-time in 1983.

== Personal life and death ==
Byatt married Ian Charles Rayner Byatt in 1959 and moved to Durham. They had a daughter together, as well as a son, Charles, who was killed by a drunk-driver at the age of 11 while walking home from school. She spoke of her son's death and its influence on her lecturing and subsequent career after publishing The Children's Book, in which the image of a dead child features. She came to regard her academic career symbolically. She later wrote the poem "Dead Boys". The marriage was dissolved in 1969. Later that year, Byatt married Peter Duffy, and they had two daughters.

Byatt's relationship with her sister Margaret Drabble was sometimes strained due to the presence of autobiographical elements in both their writing. While their relationship was no longer especially close and they did not read each other's books, Drabble described the situation as "normal sibling rivalry" and Byatt said it had been "terribly overstated by gossip columnists." Byatt was an agnostic, though she maintained an affinity for Quaker services. She enjoyed watching snooker, tennis, and football.

Byatt lived primarily in Putney, and died at home on 16 November 2023, at the age of 87.

== Influences ==
Byatt was influenced by Henry James and George Eliot as well as Emily Dickinson, T. S. Eliot, Samuel Taylor Coleridge, Tennyson and Robert Browning, in merging realism and naturalism with fantasy. She was not an admirer of the Brontë family, nor did she like Christina Rossetti. She was ambivalent about D. H. Lawrence. She knew Jane Austen's work "off by heart" before her teens. In her books, Byatt alluded to, and built upon, themes from Romantic and Victorian literature. She cited art historian John Gage's book on the theory of colour as one of her favourite books to reread.

== Writing ==
=== Fiction ===
Byatt wrote a lot while attending boarding school but had most of it burnt before she left.

She began writing her first novel while at the University of Cambridge, where she did not attend many lectures but when she did, she passed the time attempting to write a novel, which—given her limited experience of life—involved a young woman at university trying to write a novel, a novel, her novel, which—she knew—was "no good". She left it in a drawer when she was finished. After departing Cambridge, she spent one year as a postgraduate student in the United States and began her second novel, The Game, continuing to write it at Oxford when she returned to England. After getting married in 1959 and moving to Durham, she left The Game aside and resumed work on her earlier novel. She sent it to literary critic John Beer, whom she had befriended while at Cambridge. Beer sent Byatt's novel to the independent book publishing company Chatto & Windus. From there Cecil Day-Lewis wrote her a response and invited her to lunch at The Athenaeum. Day-Lewis was Byatt's first editor; D. J. Enright would succeed him.

Shadow of a Sun, Byatt's first novel, is about a girl and her father and was published in 1964. It was reprinted in 1991 with its originally intended title, The Shadow of the Sun, intact. The Game, published in 1967, concerned the dynamics between two sisters. The reception for Byatt's first books became confused with her sister's writing; her sister had a quicker rate of publication.

The family theme was continued in The Quartet, Byatt's tetralogy of novels, which begins with The Virgin in the Garden (1978) and continues with Still Life (1985), Babel Tower (1996) and A Whistling Woman (2002). Her quartet was inspired by D. H. Lawrence, particularly The Rainbow and Women in Love. The family portrayed in the quartet are from Yorkshire. Byatt said the idea for The Virgin in the Garden came in part from an extramural class she taught in which she had read Tolstoy and Dostoevsky and in part from her time living in Durham in 1961, the year in which her son was born. The book was an attempt to understand what could be achieved if Middlemarch were written in the middle of the twentieth century. Byatt's book features a powerful death scene, which she invented in 1961 (inspired by Byatt's reading of Angus Wilson's book The Middle Age of Mrs Eliot and the accident in its opening), a death scene that has drawn complaints from numerous readers for its vividness. Describing mid-20th-century Britain, the books follow the life of Frederica Potter, a young intellectual studying at Cambridge at a time when women were heavily outnumbered by men at that university, and then tracing her journey as a divorcée with a young son as he makes a new life in London. Byatt said some of the characters in her fiction represented her "greatest terror which is simple domesticity." Like Babel Tower, A Whistling Woman touches on the utopian and revolutionary dreams of the 1960s.

Byatt was also an accomplished writer of short stories, and her first published collection was Sugar and Other Stories (1987). The Matisse Stories (1993) features three pieces, each describing a painting by the eponymous painter; each is the tale of an initially smaller crisis that shows the long-present unravelling in the protagonists' lives. The Djinn in the Nightingale's Eye, published in 1994, is a collection of fairy tales. Byatt's other short story collections are Elementals: Stories of Fire and Ice, published in 1998, and Little Black Book of Stories, published in 2003. Her books reflect a continuous interest in zoology, entomology, geology, and Darwinism among other repeated themes. She was also interested in linguistics and took a keen interest in the translation of her books. Byatt said: "I can't say how important it was to me when Angela Carter said 'I grew up on fairy stories—they're much more important to me than realist narratives'. I hadn't had the nerve to think that until she said it, and I owe her a great deal". Carter, in an earlier (first) meeting with Byatt after a Stevie Smith poetry reading, had dismissed Byatt's work, so this change of heart vindicated Byatt's approach to writing and Byatt readily acknowledged it.

External audio
- Listen to an interview with A. S. Byatt given to Fresh Air on WHYY-FM, 21 November 1991 (following publication of Possession; c. 15 minutes)

Possession (1990) parallels the emerging relationship of two contemporary academics with the lives of two (fictional) 19th-century poets whom they are researching. Possession is a historical fiction. It won the 1990 Booker Prize and was adapted for a film released in 2002.

Byatt's novella Morpho Eugenia was included in Angels & Insects (1992), which was turned into the eponymous 1995 film; that film received an Academy Award for Best Costume Design in 1997.

Byatt's novel The Biographer's Tale, published in 2000, she originally intended as a short story titled "The Biography of a Biographer", based on her notion of a biographer's life in a library investigating another person's life. This she developed into writing about a character called Phineas G. Nanson, who is attempting to learn about a biographer for a book he intends to write, but who can only locate fragments of his three unwritten biographies, which are on Galton, Ibsen and Linnaeus. Phineas Gilbert Nanson is named after an insect and is almost an anagram of Galton, Ibsen and Linnaeus, though Byatt said this was an uncanny coincidence that she did not realise until afterwards.

The Children's Book, published in 2009, is a novel spanning from 1895 until the end of the First World War, centring on the fictional writer Olive Wellwood. She is based upon E. Nesbit. Another character—Herbert Methley—is a combination of H. G. Wells and D. H. Lawrence, according to Byatt. The novel also features Rupert Brooke, Emma Goldman, Auguste Rodin, George Bernard Shaw, Virginia Woolf and Oscar Wilde, all appearing as themselves. Byatt initially intended to title the book The Hedgehog, the White Goose and the Mad March Hare.

She wrote at her home in Putney, West London, and at another house in the Cévennes in Southern France, where she spent her summers. She did not write her fiction on a computer but by hand, though she had deployed a computer for non-fiction articles. According to a 1991 unpublished interview with the Los Angeles Times Book Review, Byatt said she began her writing day at around 10 a.m., prompting herself by reading something easy and then something harder: "And then after a bit if I read something difficult that's really interesting I get this itch to start writing. So what I like to do is to write from about half past twelve, one, through to about four". At this point, she said, she would begin reading again.

=== Criticism ===
Byatt wrote two critical studies of Iris Murdoch, who was a friend, mentor and another significant influence on her own writing. They were titled Degrees of Freedom: The Early Novels of Iris Murdoch (1965) and Iris Murdoch: A Critical Study (1976). Byatt also described Murdoch's husband John Bayley's decision to publish a memoir of his time with her as "wicked" and "unforgivable", saying: "I knew her enough to know that she would have hated it... it's had a horrible effect on how people feel about her and see her and think about her."

Byatt's other critical studies include Wordsworth and Coleridge in Their Time (1970). 2001's Portraits in Fiction is about painting in novels, and features references to Emile Zola, Marcel Proust and Iris Murdoch; Byatt had earlier touched upon this subject in a 2000 lecture she delivered at the National Portrait Gallery in London.

Byatt was a public encourager of the new young generation of British writers, including Philip Hensher (Kitchen Venom), Robert Irwin (Exquisite Corpse), A. L. Kennedy, Lawrence Norfolk, David Mitchell (Ghostwritten), Ali Smith (Hotel World), Zadie Smith (White Teeth) and Adam Thirlwell, saying in 2009 that she was "not entirely disinterested, because I wish there to be a literary world in which people are not writing books only about people's feelings ... all the ones I like write also about ideas". She contrasted some of those preferences with the work of Martin Amis, Julian Barnes, Ian McEwan and Graham Swift—then added, "In fact I admire all four of those writers... they don't only do people's feelings... nevertheless it's become ossified". Norfolk she described in 2003 as "the best of the young novelists now writing". She also spoke of her admiration for American writer Helen DeWitt's book The Last Samurai. Hensher, who counted Byatt as a friend, said: "She's very unusual for an English person, in that she's quite suspicious of comedy. With most people, sooner or later, every intellectual position comes down to a joke—it never does with her."

Byatt was a judge on many literary award panels, including the Betty Trask Award, the David Higham Prize for Fiction, the Hawthornden Prize and the Booker. She also wrote for the media, including for The Times Literary Supplement, British journal Prospect and newspapers The Guardian, The Independent and The Sunday Times.

== Awards and honours ==
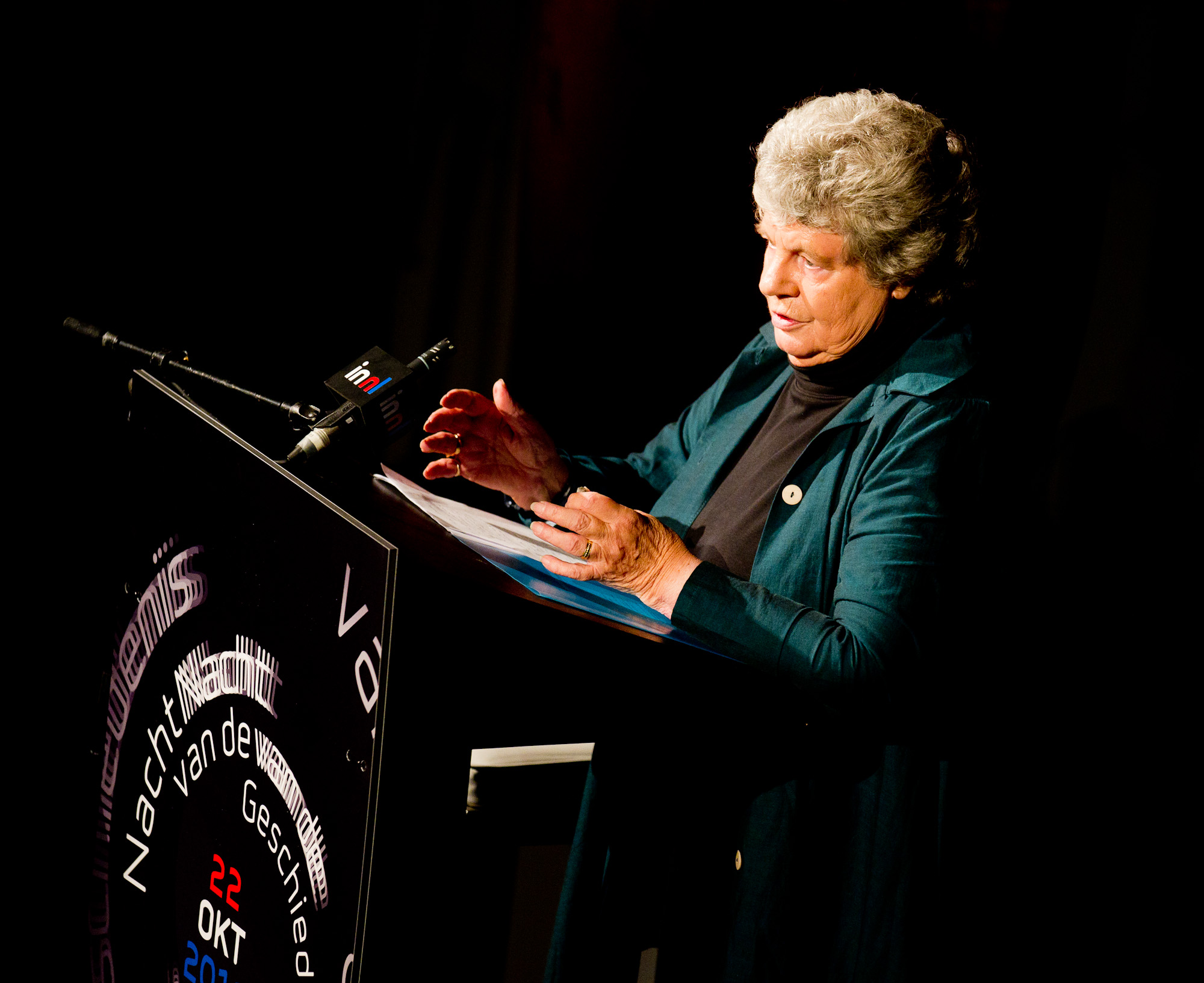
Byatt, pictured in Amsterdam in 2011

Byatt was mentioned as a candidate for the Nobel Prize in Literature.

=== Honours ===
Byatt was appointed Commander of the Order of the British Empire (CBE) in the 1990 New Year Honours, and was promoted to Dame Commander of the Order of the British Empire (DBE), "for services to Literature", in Elizabeth II's 1999 Birthday Honours.

She was also awarded:

- 1991: Honorary DLitt from the Durham University
- 1993: Honorary LittD from the University of Liverpool
- 1994: Honorary Doctorate from the University of Portsmouth
- 1995: Honorary Doctorate from the University of London
- 1999: Honorary DLitt from the University of Cambridge
- 1999: Honorary Fellow, Newnham College, Cambridge
- 2004: Honorary Doctor of Letters from the University of Kent
- 2004: Honorary Fellow, University College London
- 2008: The Times named her on its list of the 50 greatest British writers since 1945
- 2010: Honorary doctorate from Leiden University
- 2017: Fellow of the British Academy of the British Academy
- 2017: Golden Plate Award of the American Academy of Achievement

=== Literary ===
- 1986: PEN/Macmillan Silver Pen Award, for Still Life
- 1990: Booker Prize for Fiction, for Possession: A Romance
- 1990: Irish Times International Fiction Prize, for Possession: A Romance
- 1991: Commonwealth Writers Prize (Eurasia Region, Best Book), for Possession: A Romance
- 1995: Premio Malaparte (Italy)
- 1995: Aga Khan Prize for Fiction, for The Djinn in the Nightingale's Eye
- 1998: Mythopoeic Award for Adult Literature, for The Djinn in the Nightingale's Eye
- 2002: Shakespeare Prize (Germany)
- 2009: Blue Metropolis International Literary Grand Prix
- 2009: Booker Prize shortlist, for The Children's Book
- 2010: James Tait Black Memorial Prize, for The Children's Book
- 2016: Erasmus Prize (Netherlands), for "exceptional contribution to literature"
- 2017: Park Kyong-ni Prize (South Korea)
- 2018: Hans Christian Andersen Literature Award (Denmark)

== Memberships ==
- 1987–1988: Kingman Committee of Inquiry into the teaching of English Language, (Department of Education and Science)
- 1984–1988: Management Committee, Society of Authors (Deputy chairman, 1986, Chairman, 1986–1988)
- 1993–1998: Board, British Council (Member of Literature Advisory Panel, 1990–1998)
- 2014: American Academy of Arts and Sciences, Foreign Honorary Member

== Works ==
=== Novels ===
The following books form a tetralogy known as The Quartet: The Virgin in the Garden (1978), Still Life (1985), Babel Tower (1996) and A Whistling Woman (2002).

- 1964: Shadow of a Sun, Chatto & Windus reprinted in 1991 with originally intended title The Shadow of the Sun
- 1967: The Game, Chatto & Windus
- 1978: The Virgin in the Garden, Chatto & Windus
- 1985: Still Life, Chatto & Windus
- 1990: Possession: A Romance, Chatto & Windus
- 1996: Babel Tower, Chatto & Windus
- 2000: The Biographer's Tale, Chatto & Windus
- 2002: A Whistling Woman, Chatto & Windus
- 2009: The Children's Book, Chatto & Windus
- 2011: Ragnarok: The End of the Gods, Canongate ISBN 9780802120847

=== Short story collections ===
- 1987: Sugar and Other Stories, Chatto & Windus
- 1993: The Matisse Stories, Chatto & Windus
- 1994: The Djinn in the Nightingale's Eye, Chatto & Windus
- 1998: Elementals: Stories of Fire and Ice, Chatto & Windus
- 2003: Little Black Book of Stories, Chatto & Windus
- 2021: Medusa's Ankles: Selected Stories, Chatto & Windus

=== Novellas ===
- 1992: Angels and Insects, Chatto & Windus; comprises a pair of novellas:
  - Morpho Eugenia
  - The Conjugial Angel

=== Essays and biographies ===
- 1965: Degrees of Freedom: The Early Novels of Iris Murdoch, Chatto & Windus
- 1970: Wordsworth and Coleridge in their Time, Nelson
- 1976: Iris Murdoch: A Critical Study, Longman
- 1989: Unruly Times: Wordsworth and Coleridge, Poetry and Life, Hogarth Press
- 1991: Passions of the Mind: Selected Writings, Chatto & Windus
- 1995: Imagining Characters: Six Conversations about Women Writers (with Ignes Sodre), Chatto & Windus
- 2000: On Histories and Stories: Selected Essays, Chatto & Windus
- 2001: Portraits in Fiction, Chatto & Windus
- 2016: Peacock & Vine: On William Morris and Mariano Fortuny, Knopf ISBN 978-1101947470
- 2020: The Women Writers Handbook, Aurora Metro Books

=== Texts edited ===
- 1989: George Eliot: Selected Essays, Poems and Other Writings (editor with Nicholas Warren), Penguin
- 1995: New Writing Volume 4 (editor with Alan Hollinghurst), Vintage
- 1997: New Writing Volume 6 (editor with Peter Porter), Vintage
- 1998: Oxford Book of English Short Stories (editor), Oxford University Press
- 2001: The Bird Hand Book (with photographs by Victor Schrager), Graphis Inc. (New York)
