= Hans Christian Andersen Literature Award =

Danish literary award

The Hans Christian Andersen Literature Award is a Danish literary award established in 2010. It is awarded every other year to a living author whose work resembles that of Hans Christian Andersen. It is one of the biggest literary prizes in the world with the winner receiving kr. 500,000 (£60,000, or approximately $90,000). The winner receives a bronze sculpture "The Ugly Duckling" by sculptor Stine Ring Hansen.

Paulo Coelho is listed for 2007 even though the award was not established until 2010. This is because in 2007 Coelho was presented with an honorary award by the city of Odense that was so well received the organizers of the ceremony decided to make it an annual affair and thus the idea for the Hans Christian Andersen Literature Award was born, the first official award given in 2010 but Coelho's honorary award is also listed by the award organizers.

== Winners ==
- 2007: Paulo Coelho (Honorarium – see note above)
- 2010: J. K. Rowling
- 2012: Isabel Allende
- 2014: Salman Rushdie
- 2016: Haruki Murakami
- 2018: A. S. Byatt
- 2022: Karl Ove Knausgård
- 2024: Margaret Atwood
