= Angels and Insects =

- Theatrical release poster
- Directed by: Philip Haas
- Screenplay by: Philip Haas; Belinda Haas
- Based on: Morpho Eugenia by A. S. Byatt
- Produced by: Joyce Herlihy; Belinda Haas
- Starring: Mark Rylance; Patsy Kensit; Kristin Scott Thomas
- Cinematography: Bernard Zitzerman
- Music by: Alexander Balanescu
- Production companies: Playhouse International Pictures; The Samuel Goldwyn Company
- Distributed by: The Samuel Goldwyn Company (United States); Film Four Distributors Limited (United Kingdom)
- Release date: 5 November 1995
- Running time: 116 minutes
- Countries: United States; United Kingdom
- Language: English
- Box office: $3.4 million

Angels and Insects (sometimes styled as Angels & Insects) is a 1995 romantic drama film directed by Philip Haas and starring Mark Rylance, Patsy Kensit, and Kristin Scott Thomas. It was written by Philip and Belinda Haas with A. S. Byatt after her 1992 novella Morpho Eugenia (included in her book Angels and Insects). The film received an Academy Award nomination for Best Costume Design.

== Plot ==
William Adamson, a naturalist, returns to Victorian England, staying with his benefactor, Sir Harold Alabaster, a wealthy Baronet. William has lost his possessions in a shipwreck, returning from an extended expedition to the Amazon. Now dependent upon his patron, he is employed to catalog Sir Harold's specimen collection and teach his younger children the natural sciences, assisting their governess, the unassuming Matty Crompton.

William becomes enamoured of Sir Harold's eldest daughter, Eugenia. Eugenia is softly spoken, anxious, and mourning the recent death of her fiancé. Despite his impoverishment, Eugenia proves receptive and accepts his marriage proposal. Although Sir Harold grants his approval, Eugenia's snobbish and spoilt brother Edgar dislikes William's humble origins.

Soon after the marriage, Eugenia becomes pregnant. Eugenia's behaviour alternates between coldness, locking William out of her room, and intense sexual passion. The couple has five children. She names one son Edgar, in her family's tradition, annoying William. He spends much of his time with the Alabaster children and Matty, observing an ant colony in the forest, with a view to writing a book. Returning via the stables from an excursion, William discovers Edgar raping a teenage servant. Edgar tells William that she consented, but she is clearly terrified. William forms a bond with Matty, who encourages his scientific activities and displays a strong intelligence. The book is successfully published.

One day, William is summoned from the hunt to the house by a servant who claims Eugenia wants him. Entering the bedroom, he finds Eugenia and Edgar engaging in incestuous sex. Eugenia confesses that this has occurred since childhood and that her fiancé committed suicide in consequence. She says that when it started she was too young to understand but, after she saw herself through the eyes of her fiancé, she felt guilty. In tears, Eugenia explains that she tried to stop, but that Edgar's will was too strong. William realises that he has been used to conceal the incest and that the children (who bear no resemblance to him) are Edgar's.

Matty reveals her knowledge of the affair to William during a Scrabble-like game. Later, she explains that the servants were also aware and arranged for him to find out. Expressing frustration at her life and dependency on the Alabasters, Matty reveals that she has published her own book on the insects and has bought tickets for a ship for the Amazon. William is reluctant; despite his attraction, he feels that the rainforest is unsuitable for a woman. After she assures him of her strength and love for him, William acquiesces.

Before leaving, William meets Eugenia and tells her he intends never to return but will continue to financially support her children. He also promises to keep her secret, for fear of injuring her ailing father, and hopes she may find a way to live with her guilt. William and Matty depart in a coach for Liverpool, eager to begin their new adventure and leave the past behind.

== Cast ==
- Mark Rylance as William Adamson
- Kristin Scott Thomas as Matty Crompton
- Patsy Kensit as Eugenia Alabaster Adamson
- Jeremy Kemp as Sir Harold Alabaster
- Douglas Henshall as Edgar Alabaster
- Annette Badland as Lady Alabaster
- Chris Larkin as Robin
- Anna Massey as Miss Mead
- Saskia Wickham as Rowena Alabaster
- Lindsay Thomas as Lady Alabaster's Maid
- Michelle Sylvester as Margaret Alabaster
- Clare Lovell as Elaine Alabaster
- Jenny Lovell as Edith Alabaster
- Oona Haas as Alice Alabaster
- Angus Hodder as Guy Alabaster
- John Veasey as Arthur
- Margaret Golder as Nurse
- Paul Ready as Tom
- Naomi Gudge as Martha
- John Jenkins as Ralph Blackwood
- Clare Redman as Amy

== Production ==
The film was made on location at Arbury Hall in Nuneaton, Warwickshire, the home of the 3rd Viscount Daventry. The costumes worn by Kensit and the other actresses were designed in bright colors and bold patterns to evoke the appearance of insects, which earned the film an Academy Award nomination for Best Costume Design. In the marriage proposal scene, Patsy Kensit's gown was treated with female sex hormones to attract the moths to her. 6,000 ants were brought in initially for the forest colony scenes, but they walked off before filming. Another 6,000 were brought in as a replacement, only for the original 6,000 to return.

== Release and reception ==
The film was entered into competition at the Cannes Film Festival in May 1995 and screened at the London Film Festival on 5 November. It received a limited release in the US on 26 January 1996. Critical reception was very strong, with the performances and production values being particularly praised. Janet Maslin claimed the film had "...formidable intensity and haunting beauty" and Roger Ebert awarded it 3.5 stars out of 4. Edward Guthmann of the San Francisco Chronicle thought that Haas directed the film "...with elegance and control, and seasons the sexier, more melodramatic elements of his tale with subtle, slightly mocking irony."

Time Out concluded that Angels and Insects "...is not your average period drama...the costumes, design, music and camerawork steer clear of naturalism, highlighting both the modernity of the approach and the notions of humans as creatures to be observed dispassionately. Despite some uneven pacing and variability in performance, this is a work of clarity, ambition and intelligence."

In the US the film was released on VHS on 21 February 2000, on DVD 19 March 2002. In the UK the film was released on 3 February 2003 on both DVD and VHS.

On the review aggregator website Rotten Tomatoes, 67% of 24 critics' reviews are positive.

== Awards ==
- Nominated - Academy Award (1997) for Best Costume Design (Paul Brown)
- Nominated - Cannes Film Festival (1995) for the Golden Palm for Best Director (Philip Haas)
- Won - Evening Standard British Film Award (1996) for Best Actress (Kristin Scott Thomas)
- Won - National Board of Review (1996) Special Recognition for Excellence in Filmmaking
