= Rabbit Is Rich =

1981 novel by John Updike

Rabbit is Rich
- First edition
- Author: John Updike
- Language: English
- Publisher: Alfred A. Knopf
- Publication date: September 12, 1981
- Publication place: United States
- Media type: Print (hardback & paperback)
- Pages: 480 pp
- ISBN: 0-394-52087-4
- OCLC: 7283732
- Dewey Decimal: 813/.54 19
- LC Class: PS3571.P4 R25 1981
- Preceded by: Rabbit Redux
- Followed by: Rabbit At Rest

Rabbit Is Rich is a 1981 novel by John Updike. It is the third novel of the tetralogy that begins with Rabbit, Run, continues with Rabbit Redux, and concludes with Rabbit at Rest. There is also a related novella, Rabbit Remembered (2001). Rabbit Is Rich was awarded the Pulitzer Prize for Fiction and the National Book Award for Fiction (Note: This was the 1982 award for hardcover Fiction. From 1980 to 1983 in National Book Awards history there were dual hardcover and paperback awards in most categories. Most of the paperback award-winners were reprints, including the 1982 Fiction.) in 1982, as well as the National Book Critics Circle Award for Fiction in 1981. The first-edition hardcover "rainbow" dust jacket for the novel was designed by the author and is significantly different from the horizontal-stripe designs deployed on the other three Rabbit novel covers. Subsequent printings, however, including trade paperbacks, feature the stripe motif with stock images of a set of car keys or an image of a late-1970s Japanese automobile.

== Plot summary ==
This third novel of Updike's Rabbit series examines the life of Harry "Rabbit" Angstrom, a one-time high school basketball star, who has reached a paunchy middle-age without relocating from Brewer, Pennsylvania, the poor, fictional city of his birth. Harry and Janice, his wife of 22 years, live comfortably, having inherited her late father's Toyota dealership. He is indeed rich, but Harry's persistent problems—his wife's drinking, his troubled son's schemes, his libido, and spectres from his past—complicate life. Having achieved an opulent lifestyle that would have embarrassed his working-class parents, Harry is not greedy, but neither is he ever quite satisfied. Harry has grown smitten with a country-club friend's young wife. He worries about Nelson, his indecisive son, a student at Kent State University. Throughout the book, Harry wonders whether his former lover, Ruth, ever gave birth to their illegitimate daughter.
