= The Virgin in the Garden =

A. S. Byatt novel

- First edition (publ. Chatto & Windus)
- Author: A. S. Byatt
- Language: English
- Publisher: Chatto & Windus
- Publication date: 1978
- ISBN: 0-7011-2261-7 (first edition)
- Dewey Decimal: 823.914
- LC Class: PR6052.Y2 V57

The Virgin in the Garden is a 1978 realist novel by English novelist A. S. Byatt. Set during the same year as the coronation of Elizabeth II, the novel revolves around a play about Elizabeth I of England. The novel features a strong use of symbolism, which The New York Times called "overloaded", that points towards Elizabeth I. The novel is the first of a quartet featuring Frederica Potter, followed by Still Life (1985), Babel Tower (1996), and A Whistling Woman (2002).

The book features numerous flower metaphors and Byatt described the character of Marcus as "a self-portrait: somebody baffled by things being far too much and not fittable into any of the languages you were offered".

== Reception ==
The New York Times describes the writing of "Byatt is essentially a fine, careful and very traditional storyteller."

In a 1998 interview with Philip Hensher, published in The Paris Review in 2001, Byatt commented on a piece which John Sutherland had written in The Bookseller recently claiming that The Virgin in the Garden was "completely unreadable, and that he and a colleague of his and mine at University College had a bet about whether any of them could finish it and none of them could! He actually published that. So I'm always deeply surprised when anyone says anybody is reading it".
