= Rabbit at Rest =

1990 novel by John Updike

- Author: John Updike
- Language: English
- Genre: Novel
- Publisher: Alfred A. Knopf
- Publication date: 1990
- Publication place: United States
- Media type: Print (hardback & paperback)
- Pages: 512 pp
- ISBN: 978-0-394-58815-5
- OCLC: 907112270
- Dewey Decimal: 813/.54 20
- LC Class: PS3571.P4 R23 1990
- Preceded by: Rabbit is Rich

Rabbit at Rest is a 1990 novel by John Updike. It is the fourth and final novel in a tetralogy, succeeding Rabbit, Run; Rabbit Redux; and Rabbit Is Rich. A related novella, Rabbit Remembered, was published in 2001. Rabbit at Rest won the Pulitzer Prize for Fiction in 1991, the second "Rabbit" novel to garner that award.

== Plot summary ==
This novel is part of the series that follows the life of Harry "Rabbit" Angstrom from 1960 to 1990. Rabbit at Rest focuses on the years 1988–89. Harry, nearly 40 years after his glory days as a high school basketball star in a mid-sized Pennsylvania city, has retired with Janice, his wife of 33 years, to sunny Florida during the cold months, where Harry is depressed, dangerously overweight and desperate for reasons to keep on living.

Unable to stop nibbling corn chips, macadamia nuts and other junk food, Rabbit nearly dies after a heart attack while sunfishing with his nine-year-old granddaughter, Judy. In a "redemption" of the drowning death of his infant daughter Rebecca in the earlier novel Rabbit, Run, he saves Judy from drowning during their sunfishing afternoon.

He is distracted from his own existential worries by the acts of his drug-addicted son, Nelson, to whom Janice (the actual owner of the Angstroms' wealth) has given control of the family's thriving business, a Pennsylvania Toyota dealership. The discovery that Nelson has been stealing from the company to support his drug habit causes Harry to lose the family business. Despite his multiplying difficulties, Rabbit manages to take solace in the presence of Judy, whose confidence and athleticism remind him of his high-school glory days. He is less attached to his four-year-old grandson Roy, who seems wary and fearful of Rabbit, much like Nelson.

While recuperating from heart surgery, Rabbit recognizes a nurse, Annabelle Byer, as his illegitimate daughter by his old girlfriend, Ruth. He spends time with her without identifying himself as her likely father. Then, his long-term mistress, Thelma Harrison (wife of his high-school nemesis Ron), dies of lupus. Ron confronts Harry at Thelma's funeral, but the men later reconcile over golf. Harry also encounters Cindy Murkett at the funeral, a woman he had once been obsessed with, and is saddened to see she has become an obese and bitter divorcee.

After Nelson comes back from a treatment program, and Janice begins work as a real estate agent, the family finds out that Harry has had a one-night stand with Pru, Nelson's wife, on the night after he was released from the hospital. Janice's anger over this betrayal prompts Harry to escape to Florida. While in hiding, Harry has a heart attack shortly after winning a one-on-one basketball game with a local youth (echoing the opening of Rabbit, Run in which Harry impulsively joins a group of teenagers playing basketball). Nelson and Janice reach Harry's bedside while he is still alive. Janice forgives him for his infidelities and he reconciles with his son. His personal business now largely resolved, Rabbit dies.

== Themes ==
The novel deals with the passage of time, and generational change. Harry's decline mirrors the decline of the United States which, in the period the novel is set, lacks what Harry saw as its animating purpose: the Cold War.
