= Astraea Redux =

1660 poem by John Dryden

Astraea Redux, written by John Dryden in 1660, is a royalist panegyric in which Dryden welcomes the new regime of King Charles II. It is a vivid emotional display that overshadows the cautious Heroique Stanzas that Dryden composed for Oliver Cromwell's death. In the former, Dryden apologizes for his allegiance with the Cromwellian government. Dryden was later excused by Samuel Johnson for this change in allegiance when he wrote, 'if he changed, he changed with the nation.'

The period between Cromwell and the Restoration is presented in Astraea as a time of chaos, and Charles is greeted as a restorer of peace. In the traditional form of the panegyric, Charles is praised for qualities which it is hoped he will attain as well as for those he already possesses, and Dryden recommends that Charles adopt a policy of toleration.

The poem illustrates Dryden's lifelong commitment to peace and political stability. It also shows that Dryden was looking for royal patronage; Dryden became the first official British poet laureate in 1668.

The name of the poem Astraea Redux is defined in The Nuttall Encyclopaedia as "an era which piques itself on the return of the reign of justice to the earth." English Literature scholar Paul Hammond translates the title as "Justice brought back". The poem's title is a reference to Greek goddess Astraea, a personification of justice.

Ingo Berensmeyer contrasts Astraea with Paradise Lost as a competing cultural narrative for the Restoration period, with Astraea legitimizing and supporting the monarchy.
