= Rabbit, Run =

1960 novel by John Updike

- First edition cover
- Author: John Updike
- Language: English
- Publisher: Alfred A. Knopf
- Publication date: November 2, 1960
- Publication place: United States
- Media type: Print (hardback & paperback)
- Pages: 265
- ISBN: 978-0394442068
- Dewey Decimal: 813.54
- Followed by: Rabbit Redux

Rabbit, Run is a 1960 novel by John Updike. The novel depicts three months in the life of a 26-year-old former high school basketball player named Harry "Rabbit" Angstrom, who is trapped in a loveless marriage and a boring sales job, and attempts to escape the constraints of his life. It spawned several sequels, including Rabbit Redux, Rabbit is Rich and Rabbit at Rest, as well as a related 2001 novella, Rabbit Remembered. In these novels, Updike takes a comical and retrospective look at the relentless questing life of Rabbit against the background of the major events of the latter half of the 20th century.

== Plot summary ==
Harry "Rabbit" Angstrom, formerly a high school basketball star, is now 26 and has a job selling a kitchen gadget named MagiPeeler. He is married to Janice, who was a salesgirl at the store where he once worked, and who is now pregnant. They live in Mount Judge, Pennsylvania, a suburb of Brewer, and have a two-year-old son named Nelson. Harry finds middle-class family life unsatisfying, and on the spur of the moment, leaves his family and drives south in an attempt to "escape". After getting lost, he returns to his home town, but not wanting to return to his family, he instead visits his old basketball coach, Marty Tothero.

That night, Harry has dinner with Tothero and two girls, one of whom, Ruth Leonard, is a part-time prostitute. Harry and Ruth begin a two-month affair, and he moves into her apartment. Meanwhile, Janice moves back in with her parents. The local Episcopal priest, Jack Eccles, tries to persuade Harry to reconcile with his wife. But Harry stays with Ruth until he learns she had a fling with his high school nemesis, Ronnie Harrison. Enraged, Harry coaxes Ruth into performing fellatio on him. The same night, Harry learns that Janice is in labor, and he leaves Ruth to visit his wife at the hospital.

Reconciled with Janice, Harry moves back into their home where their newborn daughter, Rebecca June, awaits them. Harry attends church one morning and, after walking the minister's wife Lucy home, interprets her invitation to come in for coffee as a sexual advance. When he declines the invitation for coffee, stating that he has a wife, she angrily slams the door on him. Harry returns to his apartment and, happy about the birth of his daughter, tries to reconcile with Janice. He encourages her to have a whiskey, then, misreading her mood, pressures her to have sex despite her postnatal condition. When she refuses and accuses him of treating her like a prostitute, Harry masturbates onto her and then leaves in an attempt to resume his relationship with Ruth. Finding her apartment empty, he spends the night at a hotel.

The next morning, still distraught at Harry's treatment of her, Janice gets drunk and accidentally drowns Rebecca June in the bathtub. The other main characters in the book except Harry soon learn of the accident and gather at Janice's parents' home. Later in the day, unaware of what has happened, Harry calls Reverend Eccles to see how his return home would be received. Reverend Eccles shares the news of his daughter's death, and Harry returns home. Tothero later visits Harry and suggests that the thing he is looking for probably does not exist. At Rebecca June's funeral, Harry's internal and external conflicts result in a sudden proclamation of his innocence in the baby's death. He then runs from the graveyard, pursued by Jack Eccles, until he becomes lost.

Harry returns to Ruth and learns that she is pregnant. Though Harry is relieved to discover she has not had an abortion, he is unwilling to divorce Janice. In his apparent final attempt to salvage his relationship with Ruth, he decides to find her and make empty promises.

Harry abandons Ruth, still missing the feeling he has attempted to grasp during the course of the novel; his fate is uncertain as the novel concludes.

== Characters ==
- Harry Angstrom – also known as Rabbit, a 26-year-old man. Married to Janice Angstrom. He was a basketball star in high school and begins the novel as a kitchen gadget salesman.
- Miriam Angstrom – also known as Mim, Rabbit's 19-year-old sister.
- Mr. Angstrom – Rabbit's father.
- Mrs. Angstrom – Rabbit's mother.
- Janice Angstrom – Rabbit's wife.
- Nelson Angstrom – Harry and Janice's two-year-old son.
- Rebecca June Angstrom – Harry and Janice's infant daughter.
- Mr. Springer – Janice's father. A used-car dealer.
- Mrs. Springer – Janice's mother. She is harshly critical of Harry when he leaves Janice.
- Jack Eccles – a young Episcopal priest. He tries to mend Harry and Janice's broken marriage. His surname is an allusion to The Book of Ecclesiastes in the Old Testament of the Bible.
- Lucy Eccles – Jack Eccles's wife. She blames Jack's job for the lack of love in her marriage because he lacks time for her.
- Fritz Kruppenbach – the Angstroms' Lutheran minister. He tells Jack Eccles that Harry and Janice are best left to themselves.
- Ruth Leonard – Rabbit's mistress with whom he lives for three months. She is a former prostitute and lives alone in an apartment for two people. She is weight-conscious.
- Margaret Kosko – a friend of Ruth's. Probably also a prostitute. She is contemptuous of Tothero.
- Mrs. Smith – a widow whose garden Rabbit looks after while away from his wife. She is 73 years old.
- Marty Tothero – Rabbit's former basketball coach. He was popular in high school but got dismissed from his job due to a "scandal". He cheats on his wife but gives marital advice to Harry. After suffering two strokes, he becomes disabled.
- Ronnie Harrison – One of Rabbit's former basketball teammates. He has slept with Margaret Kosko and Ruth Leonard.

== Inspiration and historical context ==
My subject is the American Protestant small-town middle class. I like middles. It is in middles that extremes clash, where ambiguity restlessly rules.

Updike said that when he looked around in 1959 he saw a number of scared dodgy men who could not make commitments, men who peaked in high school and existed in a downward spiral. Their idea of happiness was to be young. In 1959 America the Late Modernism period was coming to an end, and Updike inherited the cultural legacy of Modernism. With this legacy, which lacks spiritual vitality and potent erotic traditions, Rabbit has no vocabulary to give voice to his sexual and spiritual conundrums and feelings. In the novel the norms of Modernism are being replaced with those of a new era with a desiccated view of spirituality and a revaluation of eroticism, things previously held constant and in some cases repressed in traditional American thought.

The title matches the popular World War II-era song "Run, Rabbit, Run".

== Major themes ==
=== Sex ===
Updike said, "About sex in general, by all means let's have it in fiction, as detailed as needs be, but real, real in its social and psychological connections. Let's take coitus out of the closet and off the altar and put it on the continuum of human behavior." Rabbit has an animalistic obsession with sex rather than a romanticized vision. He uses superficial criteria to pick his partners. He is taken with Ruth because she "feels right" as long as she doesn't use a "flying saucer" (a diaphragm), and even compels her to fellate him during a particularly intense bout of physical desire. He seems to use intense sex to replace what is missing from his work and life at home. His sexual prowess also supplies him with the sense of identity that his basketball playing gave him. He tries to be with two women in his life, his wife Janice and Ruth Leonard. Rabbit's marriage with Janice resulted from her pregnancy when Rabbit was 23 years old. Janice was prone to drinking and has a knack for angering her husband, although she may truly love Rabbit for who he is. Ruth Leonard worked as a prostitute; she lives alone in a two-person apartment before Rabbit settles in with her. She is very conscious of her weight, considering herself plump, but at one moment, to Rabbit's eyes, she becomes “Beauty home image.” Rabbit lives with her for two months, during which time he impregnates her.

=== Religion ===
For Updike, the particular etiology of Rabbit's sickness can be perceived as his distance from God, illustrated by his cavalier conversations with Eccles. The existing framework of religion and ethics should support his devotion to his marriage, job, and life, but he finds it utterly unsatisfactory. Rabbit is clearly a sinner and in some ways he is aware of that, but he still quests for some kind of religious meaning in his life, “Well I don't know all this about theology, but I'll tell you. I do feel, I guess that somewhere behind all this... there's something that wants me to find it!” Rabbit has a crisis of faith and doesn't know what to do and calls his local pastor for help with the issue. He calls Jack Eccles who is a young minister suffering a crisis of faith. Eccles makes “saving” Rabbit his mission. “Updike explores whether someone like Rabbit might gain the sanguinity of a genuine faith as posited by Updike's hero Kierkegaard, whether in fact even God's grace might defeat the thoroughgoing identity problems that seem to plague contemporary men and women like Rabbit. In Rabbit, Run Updike raises the question of whether ethical wrongdoing and sin—acts for which we would hope Rabbit would take responsibility and repent—even exist for those with confused identities, especially when genuine loving requires sexual restraint. Some readers might ponder, along with Updike, whether grace penetrates not only sinful incorrigibility, but also theological confusion, genetic predisposition, and mental illness (Crowe 82).” Rabbit is faced with human challenges in his marriage with a drunken wife, an overbearing mother, the death of his newborn daughter and the pregnancy resulting from his infidelity. It is a general reoccurrence that Rabbit has religious thoughts or conversations and “Harry can be considered as a religious. It is because of the loss of faith that causes his first escape. When he finds that life is meaningless, he abandons his wife and children, and leaves home to seek that self under the guidance of God. But his religion is not strong; he just treats it as a kind of spiritual sustenance to escape from the reality and a tool to solve practical problems. When religion cannot solve problems for him, and indicate a way out, his faith in God begins to shake,” (Zhang, 283). Nothing is consistent in Rabbit's life except for his need to run from all of life's problems.

=== Identity ===
Rabbit faces a deep-seated psychological identity crisis throughout the book. This is due somewhat to his affectionless relationship with his mother, which has at the very least given him cause to imagine matricidal and suicidal acts. Rabbit hungers for something more than what he has, for a return to the golden era of his youth, for the sexual comfort of his relationship with Janice, and for a worldview that fits his tumultuous emotions. Rabbit Angstrom is dealing with his identity crisis and is trying to get help from the people he loves and needs to be next to him. Rabbit gets many scenarios and situations from family and friends to make his life better for himself and others around him. He tries his best to become a better person and man. Rabbit filled his emptiness in his life through lessons taught by other people in his life. He was taught that Faith can be used to help you become at peace with what you are going through like a tragic time you just encountered and how to cope with it after that. “If we are to understand Rabbit's identity crisis as emerging from Updike's Christian apologetics, the important critical task is to recognize the combination of sin, agitated depression, and simple worldliness in Rabbit, and to detect and describe the particular form of irony with which Updike hints at alternatives to his character's acts. These alternative acts will be Christian works of love that, in Kierkegaardian fashion, transcend the ethical and epitomize a genuine faith and sanguine identity. (Crowe 84)” In this paragraph by Crowe, he talks about how Rabbit has an identity crisis and he is explaining the Christian way that Rabbit grew up in and how that affected how he is to combat sin and depression and other worldly things that have happened in his life.

=== Vision of America ===
Rabbit, Run is set against the background of the America of the fifties. The Eisenhower era, apart from offering tremendous consumerist possibilities, urged Americans to reorient themselves to the postwar reality. The cultural atmosphere of the 1950s, charged by the politics of the Cold War, thus necessitated the phenomena of self-definition at all levels and in all areas of life. Alive to the mood of inner-directedness, Updike's Rabbit considers himself “as a person in the process of becoming”. This involves his rejection of certain traditional aspects of American life in search of a satisfactory place in the world that is never really found, as the book ends with his fate uncertain.

=== Transience ===
Rabbit is always running, searching and questing for meaning. But while at times he finds himself enthralled with people, like his relationship with Ruth, his conversations with Eccles, and his initial return to his family, in the end Rabbit is dissatisfied and takes flight. Transience appears to be implicit in the character.

== References to other works ==
- Previously, Updike had written a short story entitled "Ace In The Hole", and to a lesser extent a poem, "Ex-Basketball Player", with similar themes to Rabbit, Run.
- In his senior year at Harvard, Updike submitted to his writing instructor "Flick", an early version of "Ace in the Hole". Updike later sent "Flick" to The New Yorker, where it was rejected.
- Updike said that he wrote Rabbit, Run in response to Jack Kerouac's On the Road, and tried to depict "what happens when a young American family man goes on the road – the people left behind get hurt."
- The 2002 American drama film 8 Mile draws on Rabbit, Run. Its screenplay, by Scott Silver, opens with a quote from the novel: "If you have the guts to be yourself...other people'll pay your price." The protagonist, played by the rapper Eminem, is nicknamed B-Rabbit. The soundtrack of the film features a song titled "Rabbit Run".

== Reception ==
In The New York Times he was praised for his “artful and supple” style in his “tender and discerning study of the desperate and the hungering in our midst.” American novelist Joyce Carol Oates has written that Updike is “a master, like Flaubert, of mesmerizing us with his narrative voice even as he might repel us with the vanities of human desire his scalpel exposes.”

Updike himself said Rabbit, Run was the novel with which most people associate him, even though other novels in the series won Pulitzer Prizes.

== Literary significance ==
The text of the novel went through several rewrites. Knopf originally required Updike to cut some "sexually explicit passages," but he restored and rewrote the book for the 1963 Penguin edition and again for the 1995 Everyman's omnibus edition.

Though it had been done earlier, as in William Faulkner's As I Lay Dying and Albert Camus' The Fall, Updike's novel is noted as being one of several well regarded, early uses of the present tense. Updike stated:

In Rabbit, Run, I liked writing in the present tense. You can move between minds, between thoughts and objects and events with a curious ease not available to the past tense. I don't know if it is clear to the reader as it is to the person writing, but there are kinds of poetry, kinds of music you can strike off in the present tense.

Time magazine included the novel in its "Time 100 Best English-language Novels from 1923 to 2005".

The philosopher Daniel Dennett makes extended reference to the Rabbit novels in his paper "The Self as a Center of Narrative Gravity".

== Film adaptation ==
In 1970, the novel was made into a film directed by Jack Smight and starring James Caan as Rabbit, Carrie Snodgress as Janice and Jack Albertson as Marty. The script was adapted from the novel by Howard B. Kreitsek, who also served as the film's producer. The poster tag line was "3 months ago Rabbit Angstrom ran out to buy his wife cigarettes. He hasn't come home yet." In May 2018, screenwriter Andrew Davies announced that he was adapting the book for television.

== Bibliography ==
- Updike, John (November 12, 1960). Rabbit, Run (1st ed.). New York: Alfred A. Knopf.
