= Rabbit Remembered =

2001 novella by John Updike; postscript to his successful "Rabbit" series

- First edition (publ. Knopf) containing the novella Rabbit Remembered
- Author: John Updike
- Language: English
- Genre: Literary realism
- Published in: Licks of Love
- Publication date: 2001
- Publication place: United States

Rabbit Remembered is a 2001 novella (182 pp.) by John Updike and postscript to the tetralogy he began with Rabbit, Run. It first appeared in his collection of short fiction titled Licks of Love: Short Stories and a Sequel. Portions of the novella first appeared in The New Yorker in two parts under the title "Nelson and Annabelle" in 2000.

== Plot ==
Set in late 1999, the story concerns itself with the interjection of Annabelle, the illegitimate daughter to the now deceased Harry Angstrom, into the life of his middle-aged son Nelson, now separated from his wife Pru. Other key characters from the Rabbit series appear: Janice, Harry's widow, who has married Harry's old nemesis Ronnie Harrison; Judy, Harry's granddaughter, now rebellious at nineteen, who plans to become a flight attendant; and his fourteen-year-old grandson Roy, with whom Nelson communicates via email. Nelson, who has moved back in with Janice and Ronnie, is working as a mental health counselor and is working to help Michael DiLorenzo, a young man with schizophrenia, cope with his mental illness. Nelson struggles with his separation from his family, financial strife, and memories of his father, while Janice grapples with aging, a second marriage, and the old-fashioned lifestyle she grew up with fading into obsolescence as the United States moves into a new age.

Annabelle, a few months after the death of her mother Ruth, appears at Janice's house to introduce herself. She explains that her dying mother revealed the truth of her parentage and encouraged her to seek out her relatives. While Janice is not particularly receptive to her, and Ronnie is hostile, Nelson enthusiastically welcomes the chance to get to know his sister. They have three lunches and get to know one another, and bond quickly. Nelson suspects that she was abused by her stepfather, who died when she was sixteen. As tensions between Annabelle and the family begin to abate, Nelson invites her to Thanksgiving dinner, but it goes badly when the conversation descends into politics and Annabelle clashes with Nelson's stepbrothers. Ronnie, who had an affair with Ruth before Harry did, asks Annabelle how it feels to be "the bastard child of a whore and a bum?" This remark enrages Nelson, who accuses Ronnie of jealousy of Harry, and prompts Nelson to move out of the house. Christmas is then marred by news of Michael's suicide, dispelling with finality the widely shared impression that his condition had been improving. Heartbroken, Nelson blames himself for his client's death.

Nelson's demeanor softens and he forgives Ronnie for his Thanksgiving outbursts. He also meets up again with childhood friend Billy Fosnacht, twice-divorced and plagued by anxiety and depression. As the new millennium approaches, Annabelle reconciles with Nelson's family, who shares with her their memories of Harry. Nelson, Annabelle, Pru, and Billy, see the film American Beauty on New Year's Eve 1999, but get stuck in traffic as the new millennium dawns. During the discussion that follows the film, Nelson, jealous of Annabelle's flirtations with Billy, pressures Annabelle into revealing that she was sexually abused by her stepfather as a teenager and that this is why she never married. Nelson's display of virtuoso driving in heavy traffic so impresses Pru that she asks to spend the night with him; Nelson moves back to Ohio with her and begins earning a living by counseling drug addicts. The novella ends with the hope that the marriage of Nelson and Pru may recover and that Annabelle may marry Billy.
