= The Last of England =

The Last of England refers to:

- The Last of England (painting), a painting by Ford Madox Brown
- The Last of England (film), a Derek Jarman film, whose title was inspired by the Madox Brown painting
- The Last of England (book), a 1970 book of poetry by Peter Porter
