= List of paintings by Ford Madox Brown =

This is a list of paintings by the British Pre-Raphaelite artist Ford Madox Brown.

== 1830s and 1840s ==
Image	Name	Year	Current Location	Ref
	The Reverend F H S Pendleton	1837	Manchester Art Gallery	
	Execution of Mary, Queen of Scots	1839–41	Whitworth Art Gallery, Manchester	
	Mrs James Madox	1840	Ashmolean Museum, Oxford	
	Dr Primrose and his Daughters	1840	Manchester Art Gallery	
	Manfred on the Jungfrau	1840–61	Manchester Art Gallery	
	The Prisoner of Chillon	1844	Manchester Art Gallery	
	Out of Town	1843–58	Manchester Art Gallery	
	The Bromley Family	1844	Manchester Art Gallery	
	Lucy Madox Brown	1844		
	Ascension	1844	Forbes Magazine collection, New York	Listed at Bridgeman Art Library.
	The Body of Harold brought before William the Conqueror	1844–61	Manchester Art Gallery	
	The Seeds and Fruits of English Poetry	1845–51	Ashmolean Museum, Oxford	
	Portrait of a Boy	1845	Birmingham Museum and Art Gallery	
	Millie Smith	1846	Walker Art Gallery, Liverpool	
	Seraph's Watch	1846		
	Mr James Bamford	1846		
	Chaucer at the Court of Edward III	1847–51	Art Gallery of New South Wales, Sydney.(See later replica (1856–68) in Tate Britain, London)	.
	John Wycliffe Reading His Translation of the Bible to John of Gaunt	1847–48	Bradford Museums, Galleries and Heritage, Bradford	Bridgeman Art Library.
	Oure Ladye of Good Children or Oure Ladye of Saturday Night	1847	Tate Britain, London	
	View from Shorn Ridgway, Kent	1849	National Museum of Wales, Cardiff	
	Portrait of William Shakespeare	1849	Manchester Art Gallery	
	Lear and Cordelia	1849	Tate Britain, London	
	Self-Portrait	c.1850		

== 1850s ==
Image	Name	Year	Current Location	Ref
	The Pretty Baa-Lambs	1851–1859	Birmingham Museum & Art Gallery	
	Take your Son, Sir!	1851–92 (unfinished)	Tate Britain, London	
	Waiting: an English fireside of 1854-5	1851–55	Walker Art Gallery, Liverpool	
	An English Autumn Afternoon	1852–55		
	Jesus Washing Peter's Feet	1852–56 (Oil painting)	Tate Britain, London (See also watercolour (1876) in Manchester Art Gallery)	
	Work	1852–1865	Manchester Art Gallery	
	The Seeds and Fruits of English Poetry	circa 1853		
	The Brent at Hendon	1854	Tate Britain, London	
	Carrying Corn	1854–55	Tate Britain, London	
	The Last of England	1855	Birmingham Museum & Art Gallery. (See also oil version (1860) in the Fitzwilliam Museum, Cambridge and watercolour (1864-5) in Tate Britain, London	
	Windermere	1855	Lady Lever Art Gallery, Liverpool	
	The Hayfield	1855–56	Tate Britain, London	
	Chaucer at the Court of Edward III	1856–1868	Tate Britain, London	
	Stages of Cruelty	1856 (watercolour)	Tate Britain, London	
	Stages of Cruelty	1856–90 (oil)	Manchester Art Gallery (See also 1856 watercolour sketch above)	
	Hampstead - A Sketch from Nature	1857	Delaware Art Museum	Listed at Bridgeman Art Library.

== 1860s ==
Image	Name	Year	Current Location	Ref
	Walton-on-the-Naze	1860	Birmingham Museum & Art Gallery	
	The English Boy	1860	Manchester Art Gallery	
	The Irish Girl	1860	Yale Center for British Art	
	The Last of England	1860 (oil)	Fitzwilliam Museum, Cambridge	
	Death of Sir Tristram	1863	Cecil Higgins Gallery, Bedford	
	Death of Sir Tristram	1863	Birmingham Museum and Art Gallery	
	Mauvais Sujet (Writing Lesson)	1863	Tate Britain, London	
	James Leathart	1863		
	Elijah and the Widow's Son	1864	Birmingham Museum & Art Gallery (See also 1868 watercolour located in the Victoria and Albert Museum, London)	
	King Rene's Honeymoon	1864 (watercolour)	Tate Britain, London	
	King Rene's Honeymoon	1864 (oil)	National Museum of Wales, Cardiff. (See watercolour version (1864) above)	
	St Oswald and St Aidan	1864	Lady Lever Art Gallery, Liverpool	
	The Baptism of St. Oswald	c.1864	Lady Lever Art Gallery, Liverpool	
	The Last of England	1864–65 (watercolour)	Tate Britain, London	
	The Coat of Many Colours	1866 (oil)	Walker Art Gallery, Liverpool (See watercolour version (1867) below	.
	The Coat of Many Colours	1867 (watercolour)	Tate Britain, London	
	Cordelia’s Portion	1866–72	Lady Lever Art Gallery, Liverpool. (See second version (1867–75) below)	.
	Cordelia’s Portion	1867–75	Fitzwilliam Museum, Cambridge	
	The Entombment	1866–78 (watercolour)	National Gallery of Victoria, Melbourne	
	The Nosegay	1865	Ashmolean Museum, Oxford	
	The Nosegay	1867	Lady Lever Art Gallery, Liverpool. (See version of this painting in the Ashmolean Museum above)	
	Romeo and Juliet	1867 (watercolour)	Whitworth Art Gallery, Manchester	
	The Traveller	1868	Manchester Art Gallery	
	Elijah and the Widow's Son	1868 (watercolour)	Victoria and Albert Museum	
	May Memories	1869	private collection	
	The Finding of Don Juan by Haidee	1869 (watercolour)	National Gallery of Victoria, Melbourne. (See 1869 oil version below)	
	The Finding of Don Juan by Haidee	1869 (oil)	Musée d'Orsay, Paris	

== 1870s ==
Image	Name	Year	Current Location	Ref
	Romeo and Juliet	1870 (oil)	Delaware Art Museum. (See watercolour version (1867) in the Whitworth Art Gallery, Manchester	
	The Corsair's Return	1870–71	Delaware Art Museum	Listed at Bridgeman Art Library.
	The Dream of Sardanapalus	1871	Delaware Art Museum	Listed at Bridgeman Art Library
	The Convalescent	1872 (pastel)	Metropolitan Museum of Art (Other versions in City Museum and Birmingham Museum & Art Gallery)	
	The Convalescent	1872 (pastel)	Birmingham Museum & Art Gallery	
	Miss Iza Duffus Hardy	1872 (pastel)	Birmingham Museum & Art Gallery	
	Cromwell on his Farm	1873-4	Lady Lever Art Gallery, Liverpool	
	Portrait of Mr and Mrs David Davies	1873		
	Oliver Madox Brown on Deathbed	1874		
	Byron's Dream	1874	Manchester Art Gallery	
	La Rose de l'enfante (Child with Rose)	1876	Harvard Art Museums	
	Jesus Washing Peter's Feet	1876 (watercolour)	Manchester Art Gallery	
	Self-Portrait	1877	Fogg Art Museum, Harvard	
	Cromwell, Protector of the Vaudois	1877	Manchester Art Gallery	
	William Tell's Son	1877		

== 1880s ==
Image	Name	Year	Current Location	Ref
	Portrait of Madeline Scott	1883	Manchester Art Gallery	
	Platt Lane	1884	Tate Britain, London	
	Portrait of Charles Rowley (1839-1933)	1885	Manchester Art Gallery	
	Spinning	1887	Royal Jubilee Exhibition	
	Weaving	1887	Royal Jubilee Exhibition	
	Commerce	1887	Royal Jubilee Exhibition	
	Shipping	1887	Royal Jubilee Exhibition	
	Corn	1887	Royal Jubilee Exhibition	
	Wool	1887	Royal Jubilee Exhibition	
	Iron	1887	Royal Jubilee Exhibition	
	Coal	1887	Royal Jubilee Exhibition	
	Lady Rivers and her Children	1887–89	Ashmolean Museum, Oxford	

== The Manchester Murals (1879–1893) ==
- The Manchester Murals is a series of twelve paintings in Manchester Town Hall covering the history of Manchester :
  - The Romans Building a Fort at Mancenion
  - The Baptism of Edwin
  - The Expulsion of the Danes from Manchester
  - The Establishment of the Flemish Weavers
  - The Trial of Wycliffe
  - The Proclamation Regarding Weights and Measures
  - Crabtree Observing the Transit of Venus
  - Chetham's Life Dream
  - Bradshaw's Defence of Manchester
  - John Kay, Inventor of the Fly Shuttle
  - The Opening of the Bridgewater Canal
  - Dalton collecting Marsh-Fire Gas

== See also ==
- List of Pre-Raphaelite paintings
