= An English Autumn Afternoon =

Painting by Ford Madox Brown

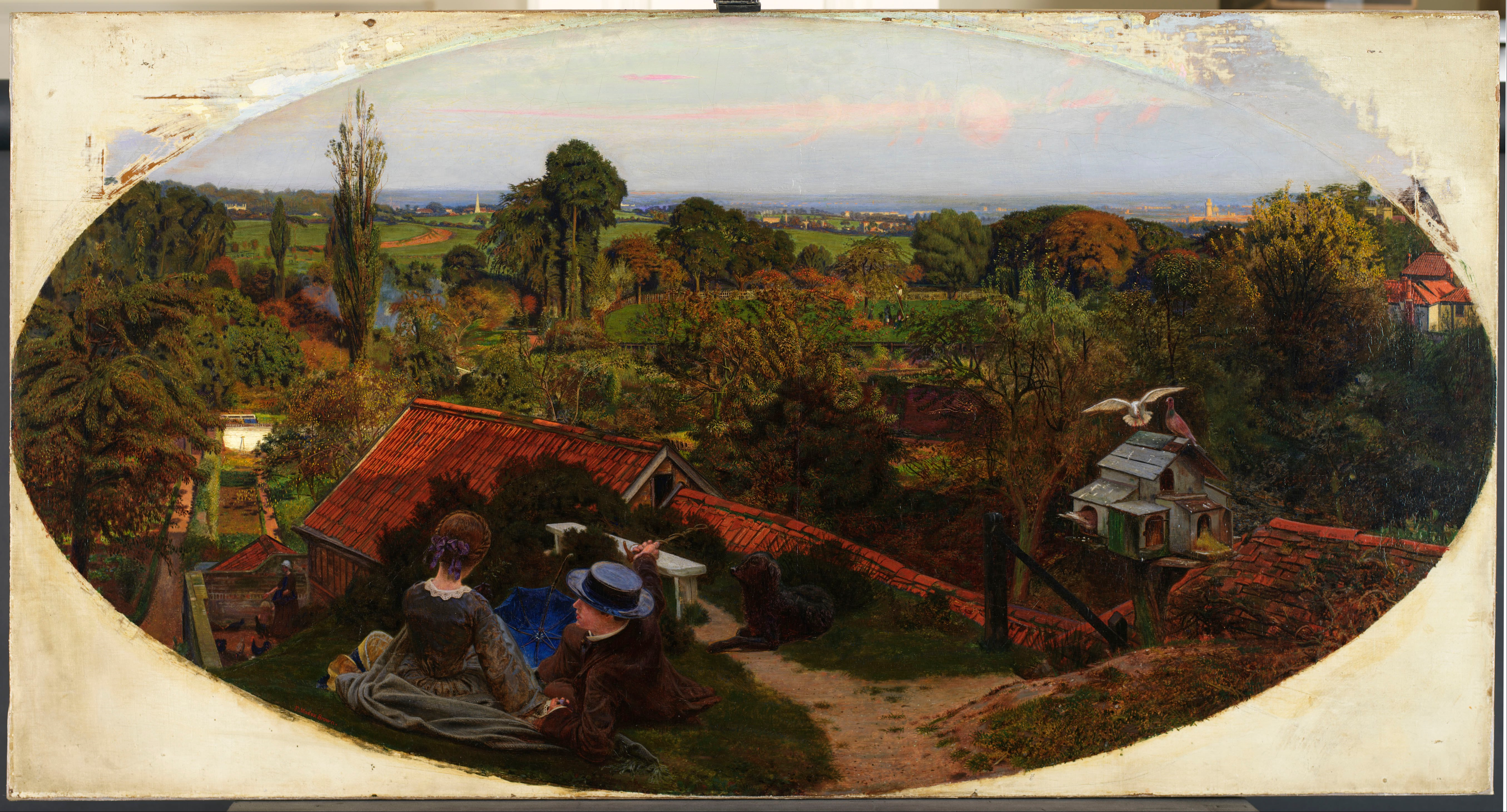
- Artist: Ford Madox Brown
- Year: 1854
- Type: Oil on canvas, landscape painting
- Dimensions: 71.2 cm × 134.8 cm (28.0 in × 53.1 in)
- Location: Birmingham Art Gallery, Birmingham

An English Autumn Afternoon is an 1854 oil painting by the British artist Ford Madox Brown. It features a view across the suburbs of Hampstead on an autumn day. A member of the Pre-Raphaelite movement, Brown had begun the work in 1852 and the oval shape of the canvas represented an experiment. Although the art critic John Ruskin was a noted supporter of the Pre-Raphaelites, he was not impressed by this painting.

Today the painting is part of the collection of the Birmingham Art Gallery, which acquired it in 1916.

== See also ==
- List of paintings by Ford Madox Brown

== Bibliography ==
- Crosby, Joanna. Apples and Orchards Since the Eighteenth Century: Material Innovation and Cultural Tradition. Bloomsbury Publishing, 2023.
- Ellis, Andrew & Roe, Sonia. Oil Paintings in Public Ownership in Birmingham. Public Catalogue Foundation, 2008.
- Prettlejohn, Elizabeth. The Cambridge Companion to the Pre-Raphaelites. Cambridge University Press, 2012.
