= Cromwell, Protector of the Vaudois =

1877 painting by Ford Madox Brown

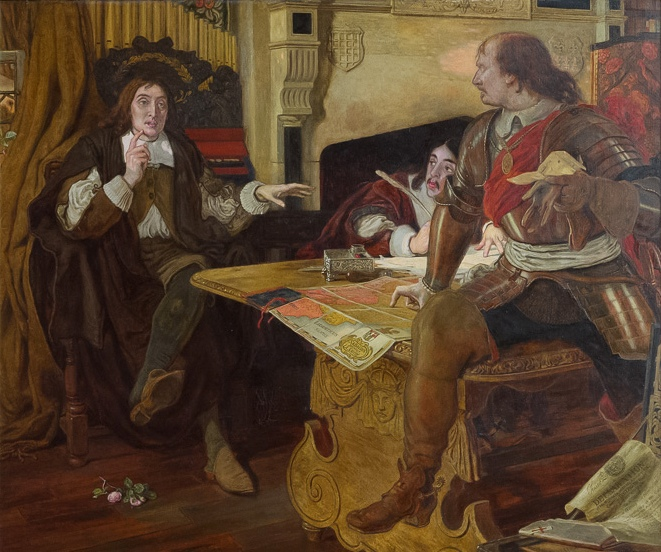
- Artist: Ford Madox Brown
- Year: 1877
- Medium: Oil on canvas
- Dimensions: 86 cm × 107 cm (34 in × 42 in)
- Location: Manchester City Art Gallery, Manchester

Cromwell, Protector of the Vaudois (1877) is a painting by the British artist Ford Madox Brown which depicts Oliver Cromwell in conversation with John Milton dictating a letter to Andrew Marvell protesting at the Piedmontese Easter massacre (1655), an attack on the Vaudois (Waldensians), a persecuted Protestant sect in Piedmont, northern Italy. It was Brown's second Cromwell painting, following Cromwell on his Farm (1875).

== Historical background ==
After a series of massacres and dispossessions of Vaudois in Italy, Cromwell organised international action on their behalf, writing letters, raising financial contributions for victims and threatening military action. During his lifetime the persecutors reined back their attacks, but after his death the Vaudois were repeatedly persecuted. Milton's sonnet "On the Late Massacre in Piedmont" ("Avenge O Lord thy slaughtered saints") was also written at this time about the massacres.

== Painting ==
Following the publication of Thomas Carlyle's Oliver Cromwell's letters and speeches, with elucidations (1845), Cromwell had been regularly portrayed in a heroic light in British art. His actions with regard to the Vaudois had been illustrated several times. Charles Rowley commissioned Brown to create the picture.

I commissioned him to paint for me the fine picture now at Manchester, "Cromwell, Protector of the Vaudois." I wanted a picture of John Milton, and the result is this masterpiece: Cromwell, Milton, and Andrew Marvell, who was then secretary to the blind poet.

Brown's painting differs from earlier versions of the scene because of its highly dynamic composition designed to stress the relationship between Cromwell as a man of action and Milton as a powerful intellectual force, with Marvell energetically poised to execute their combined wills. In this respect the painting is a development of the central theme of Brown's earlier painting Work, but in this case emphasises the work of a "power elite" rather than ordinary manual labour. Cromwell's pose, splayed across the desk, is a development of earlier imagery in which Cromwell had been depicted as a rough or unceremonious figure. His contained energy is emphasised by the precariously balanced desk, supported on a curved base with small stabilising feet. Milton's gesture is similarly transitory, finger raised, while the cropped, half-obscured figure of Marvell holds his pen ready waiting.

== See also ==
- List of paintings by Ford Madox Brown
