= Take your Son, Sir! =

Unfinished painting by Ford Madox Brown

Take your son, Sir!
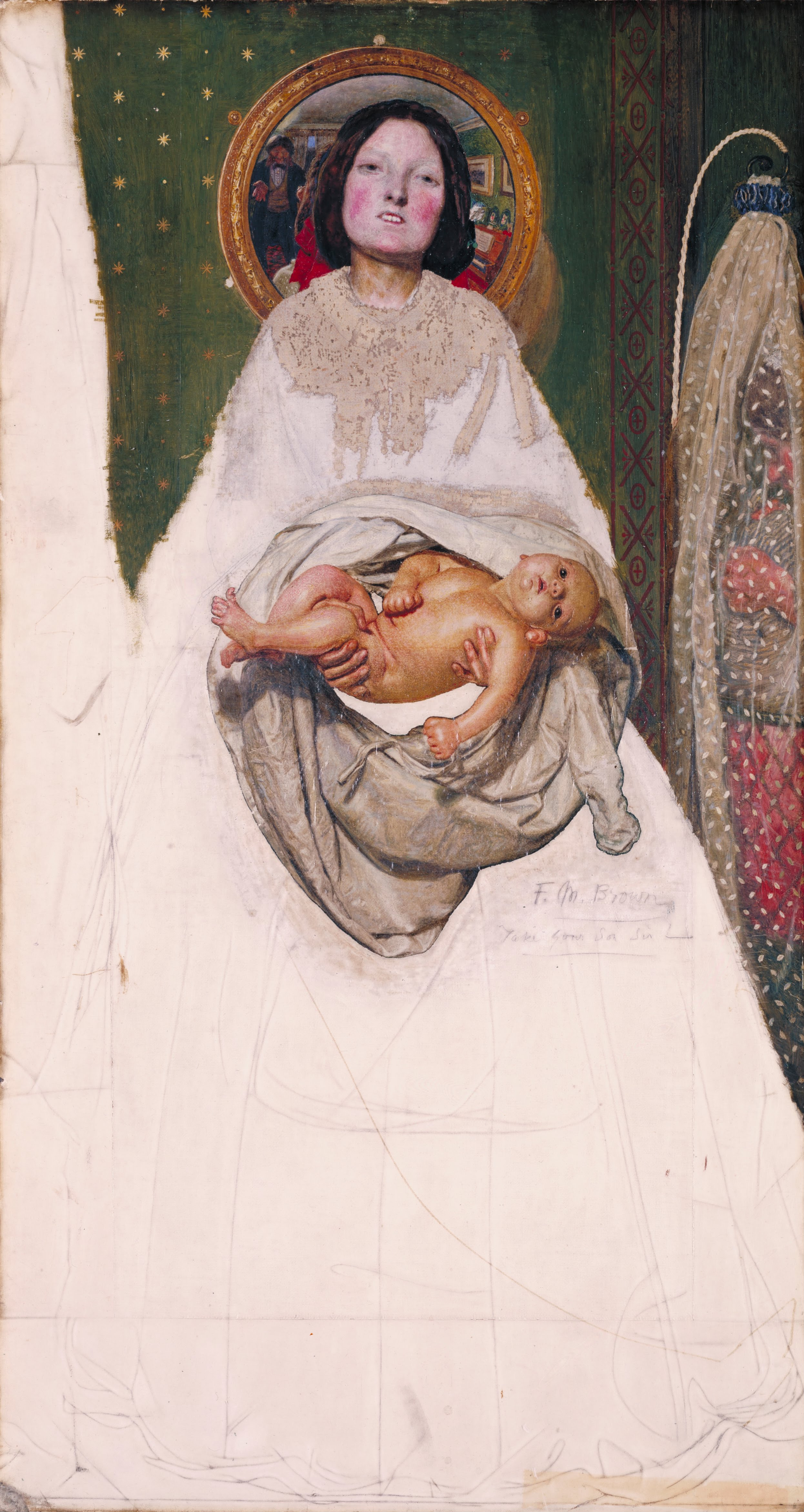
- Artist: Ford Madox Brown
- Year: 1851-1856
- Medium: Oil on canvas
- Dimensions: 38.1 cm × 70.5 cm (15.0 in × 27.8 in)
- Location: Tate Gallery, London

Take your Son, Sir! is an unfinished oil on canvas painting by the British artist Ford Madox Brown, from 1851-1856. It is held in the Tate Gallery, in London.

== History and description ==
The painting depicts a woman showing her newborn son to his father. She is offering her baby towards the viewer of the painting, who is implicitly equated with the father – seen in the mirror behind, opening his arms to receive the baby. The mirror also forms a halo behind the mother's head, and the pattern on the wallpaper suggests the starry heavens. Brown's principal influence was Jan van Eyck's painting the Arnolfini Marriage Portrait, which had recently been acquired by the National Gallery. The mirror resembles the circular mirror in van Eyck's painting, which reflects an image of the artist looking at the couple in the image.

The woman is wearing crinolines, which expand to cover the whole of the lower part of the painting. Brown has left this part incomplete, roughly squaring up and sketching the dress in outline. The title is written on the unfinished dress, underneath the child at the right.

Brown's own wife was the model for this painting, which also depicts their son. She was pregnant whilst he started making this picture and she gave later birth to a son which they named Arthur. Arthur then died at just ten months old and it is believed that Brown was unable to complete the painting through grief for his son.

== Interpretations ==
There are two principal interpretations of the picture. Most critics see it as an image of a wife offering the child to her husband, an interpretation supported by the sacred symbolism and by the fact that Brown depicted his own wife and their new son. Some commentators, however, interpret it as more confrontational image, in which an abandoned mistress presents her baby to its father.

The art historian Marcia Pointon has argued that the painting is deliberately paradoxical, playing on the conflict between new life and death. She suggests that the portrayal of the baby is influenced by medical images of fetuses surrounded by viscera within the body of woman, and that the woman's glazed, white and emaciated features suggest death.

== See also ==
- List of paintings by Ford Madox Brown
