= Cromwell on his Farm =

1874 painting by Ford Madox Brown

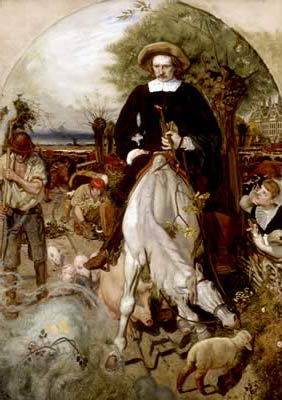
- Artist: Ford Madox Brown
- Year: 1874
- Medium: Oil on canvas
- Dimensions: 143 cm × 103.4 cm (56 in × 40.7 in)
- Location: Lady Lever Art Gallery, Port Sunlight

Cromwell on his Farm (1874) is a painting by the English artist Ford Madox Brown which depicts Oliver Cromwell observing a bonfire on his farm and thinking of a passage in the Book of Psalms: "Lord, how long wilt thou hide thyself – forever? And shall thy wrath burn like fire?" (Psalm 89). The words are inscribed on the painting's frame along with a quotation from one of Cromwell's speeches, in which he describes his life before entering into politics: "living neither in any considerable height, nor yet in obscurity, I did endeavour to discharge the duty of an honest man."

== Historical background ==
The painting depicts Cromwell as a country squire on his lands in Cambridgeshire, before he became a national figure in the power struggles which culminated in the English Civil War. Cromwell's identity as a leading revolutionary had been affirmed by Thomas Carlyle's biography Oliver Cromwell's letters and speeches, with elucidations (1845), in which his reluctance to take up the role of leader was emphasised. Carlyle was an important influence on Brown.

== Composition ==
The painting's central theme is that of enforced inertia. In it, Cromwell is portrayed as someone who has the capacity to become a major player on the national stage, but who is restricted to his own small world. It emphasises inertia through the portrayal of the distraction of Cromwell's horse by wayside fodder, which is also being eaten by a lamb from the farm: a reference to the concept of the Christian flock. The wandering piglets following a sow under Cromwell's horse refer to the story of the Gadarene swine. Cromwell carries an oak sapling in lieu of a whip, and a copy of the Bible.

The farm is a metaphor for the state, a place in which orderly labour is threatened continually by forces of disorder and in which the most everyday details are potentially filled with moral and eschatological significance. While the workers on the left of the composition are getting on with their labours, clearing away weeds, the servant at the right is demanding a response from Cromwell, her shout repeated by the screeching duck she carries. The pigs under the horse and the lamb all create a potential for disruption and instability. Behind the workers clearing weeds, a young farm worker barely controls the large herd of cattle streaming through the gate into Cromwell's farm, separating the latter from his wife and child, visible at the door of the house at the right. A spot of blood can be seen on Cromwell's collar, a reference to a famous description of him by Sir Philip Warwick, and emblematic of a bloodstained future.

== See also ==
- List of paintings by Ford Madox Brown

== See also ==
- Cromwell, Protector of the Vaudois (1877)
