= Stages of Cruelty =

Painting by Ford Madox Brown

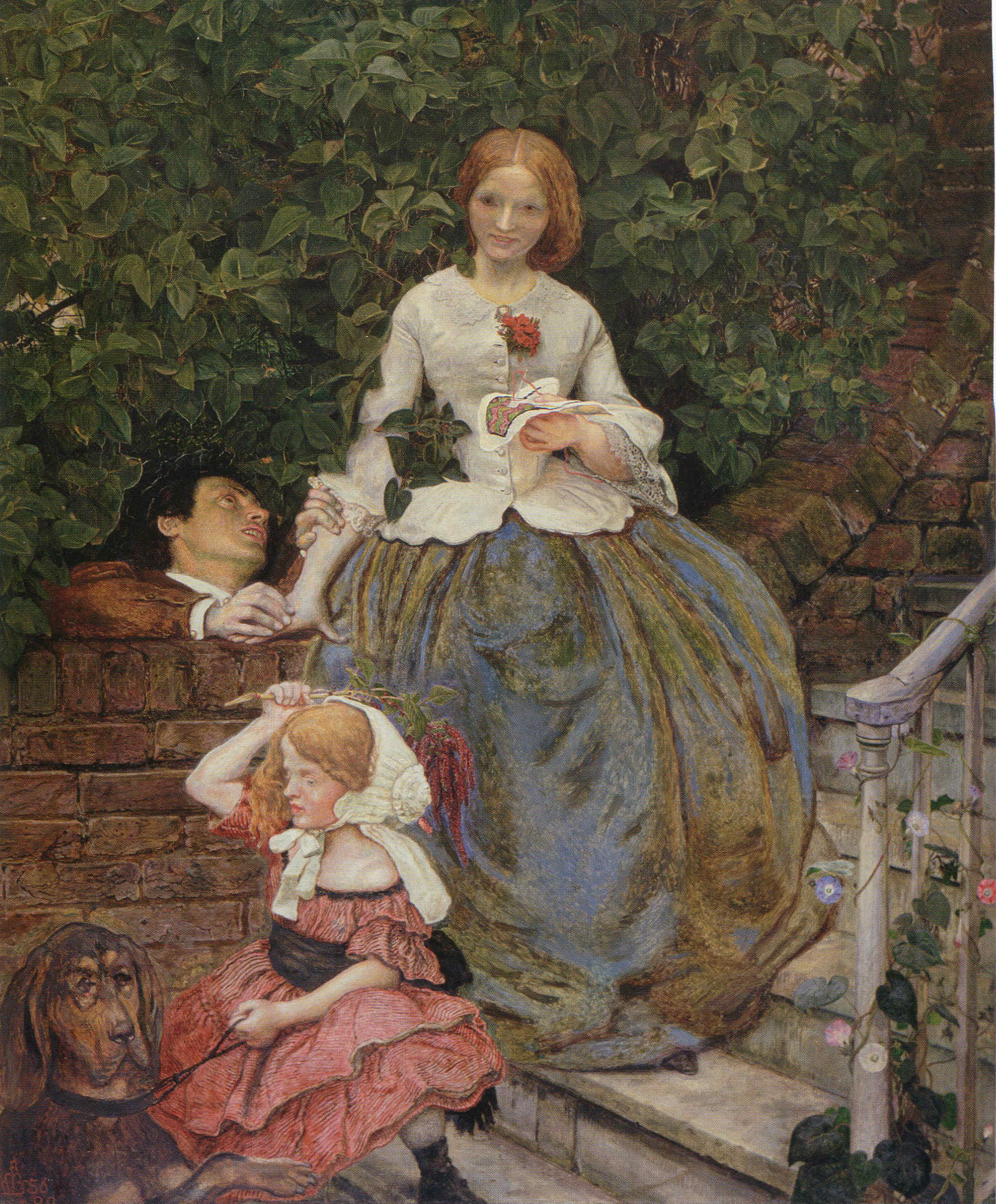
- Artist: Ford Madox Brown
- Year: 1856-1890
- Medium: Oil on canvas
- Movement: Pre-Raphaelite Brotherhood
- Dimensions: 53.3 cm × 59.9 cm (21.0 in × 23.6 in)
- Location: Manchester Art Gallery, Manchester

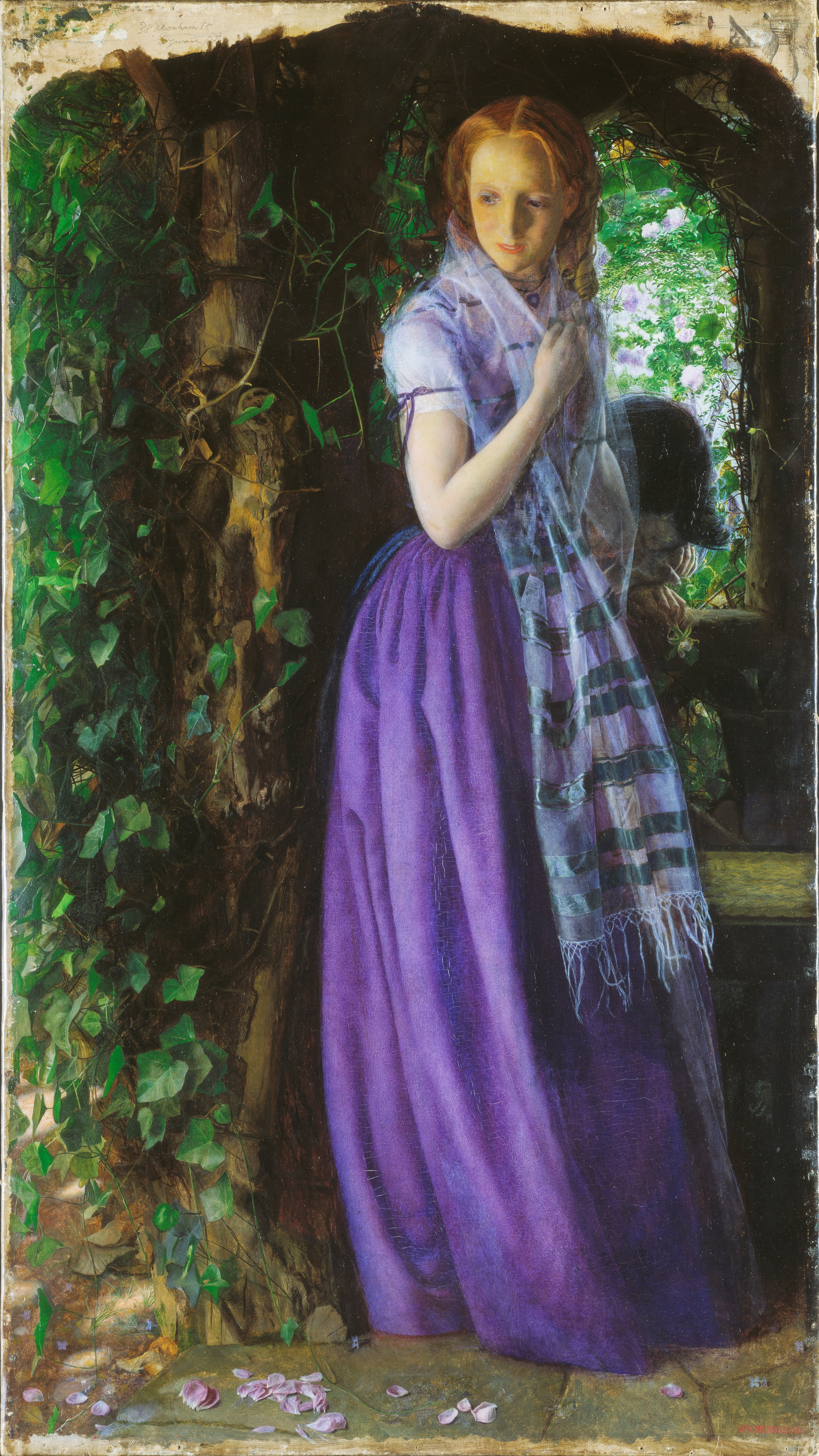
Arthur Hughes, April Love, 1856

Stages of Cruelty is an oil-on-canvas painting by the British artist Ford Madox Brown. He worked on the painting over an extended period, from 1856 to 1890. It is held by the Manchester Art Gallery.

The painting was originally entitled Stolen Pleasures are Sweet, but became Stages of Cruelty by about 1860. The composition was inspired by Arthur Hughes's 1856 painting April Love, which shows a woman turning away from her lover after an argument, and also by William Hogarth's series of engravings Four Stages of Cruelty.

Like Hogarth's series, Brown's painting shows separate episodes in the life of the same character, although in this case on the same canvas, with a cruel child growing up to become a cruel adult.

In Brown's painting, a girl in a red dress and a white bonnet is shown sitting at the bottom of a flight of stone steps, spitefully hitting her bloodhound with a stem of love-lies-bleeding while the dog raises a paw in protest. Behind her, sitting on a brick wall beside the stairs, a young woman is turning away from a man hidden in a lilac bush behind the wall. The man – her lover – looks mournfully over a wall at the woman, grasping her right hand and arm, but she rejects him without remorse. She wears a white jacket, with lace collar and cuffs, and a long blue skirt; some red flowers, perhaps geraniums, are tucked into her jacket, and she holds a piece of unfinished embroidery in her left hand. To the right, bindweed (convolvulus) climbs up the balustrade beside the stairs.

The flowers are symbolic, reflecting their accepted meanings in the Victorian language of flowers. The love-lies-bleeding stands for hopeless; the purple lilac for first love; and the bindweed (convolvulus) for extinguished hopes. One of the meanings of geraniums is deceit.

The young girl was initially modelled on Brown's second daughter Catherine, and later on Catherine's own daughter Juliet.

Brown started the work without a commission, and then it languished for many years. It was eventually finished for the brewer, Henry Boddington.

Watercolour versions of the painting are held by Tate Britain and the Ashmolean Museum.

== See also ==
- List of paintings by Ford Madox Brown
