= The Pretty Baa-Lambs =

Painting by Ford Madox Brown

Pretty Baa-Lambs
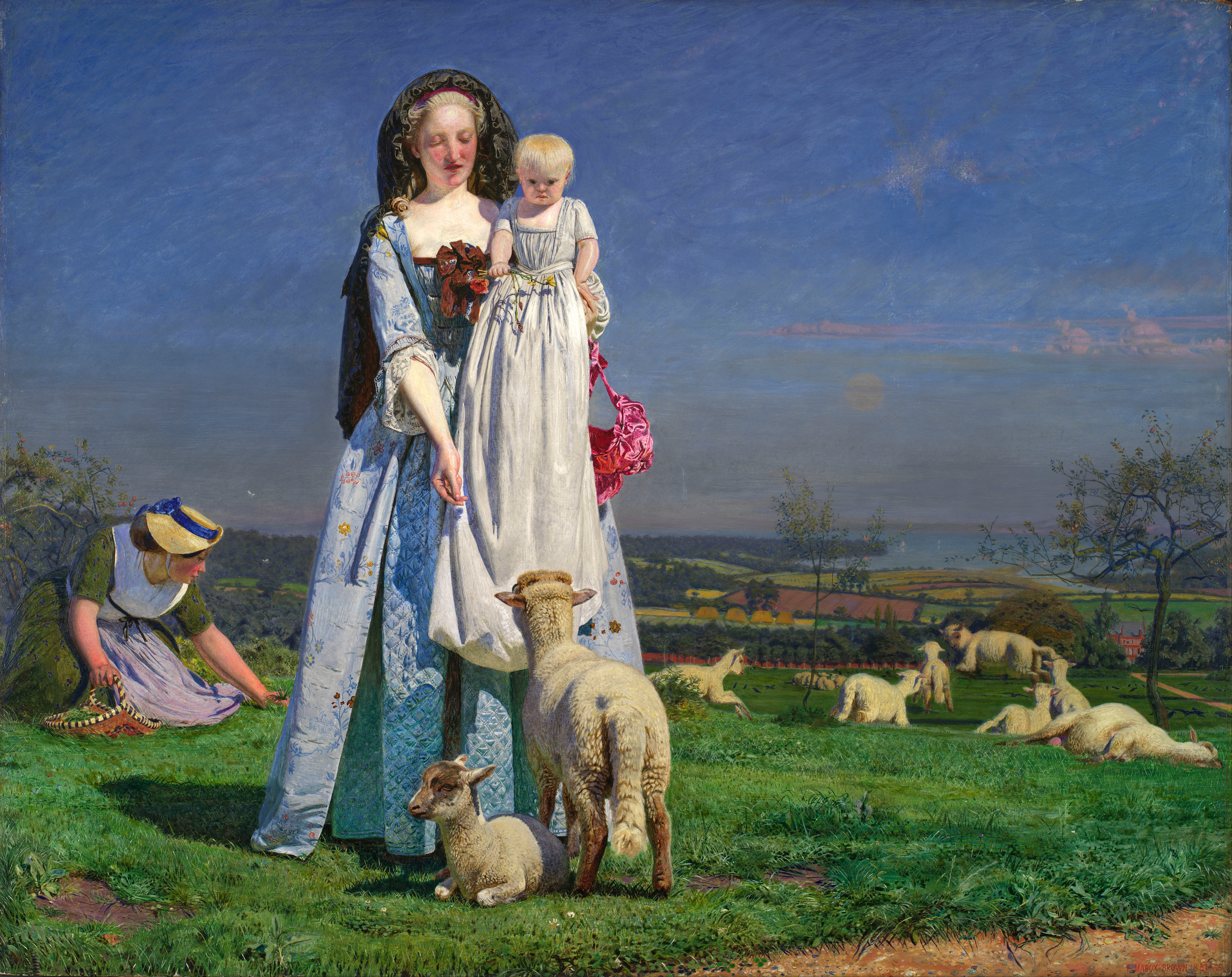
- Artist: Ford Madox Brown
- Year: 1851
- Medium: oil on panel
- Dimensions: 60.9 cm × 76.2 cm (24.0 in × 30.0 in)
- Location: Birmingham Museum and Art Gallery, Birmingham, U.K.

The Pretty Baa-Lambs is an oil-on-panel painting executed in 1851 by the English Pre-Raphaelite artist Ford Madox Brown and part of the collection of Birmingham Museum and Art Gallery.

== History and description ==
Painted 'en plein air' in bright sunshine, the work depicts the artist's model and mistress Emma Hill and their infant daughter Catherine Madox Brown, dressed in 18th-century clothes, feeding grass to a group of lambs. In the rear the family nursemaid is on her knees pulling more grass.

The picture is a simple representation of family life in what was Brown's first attempt at painting out of doors, at the time a novel concept, using a limited palette of green, blue and white with a few red highlights. The figures were painted in the garden of their Stockwell house in south London, the lambs being provided on a daily basis by a local farmer, and the background scenery of Clapham Common added afterwards.

The artist himself was somewhat irritated when asked what the moral of the picture was, if it for instance was representation of the Madonna and child. In his catalogue notes for its first public exhibition in 1852, he said there was no hidden meaning in the picture, it was simply "a lady, a baby, two lambs, a servant maid and some grass."

A smaller replica of the work is in the collection of the Ashmolean Museum in Oxford.

== See also ==
- List of paintings by Ford Madox Brown
