= The Bromley Family =

Painting by Ford Madox Brown

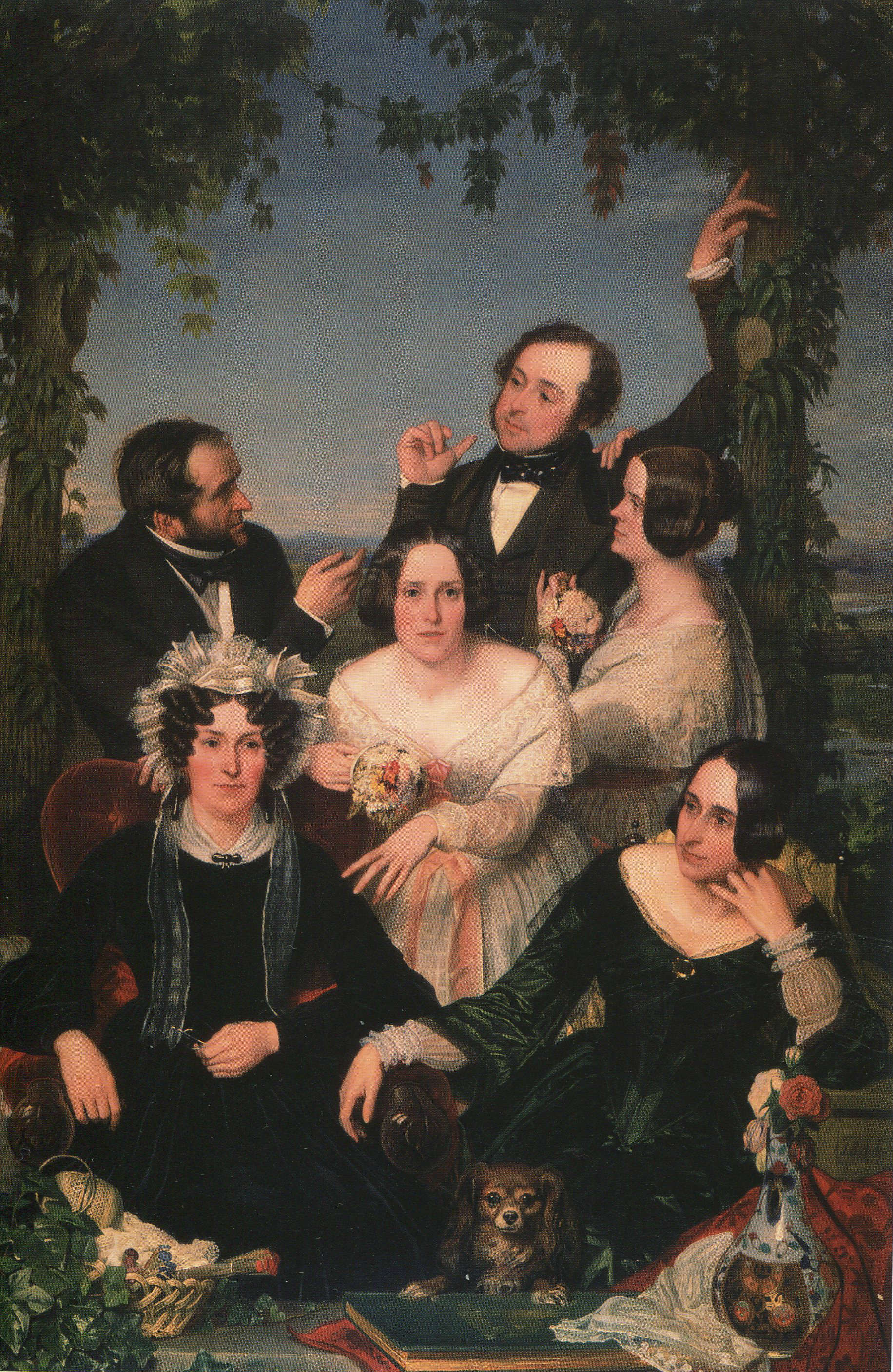
- Artist: Ford Madox Brown
- Year: 1844
- Type: Oil on canvas, portrait painting
- Dimensions: 145 cm × 81.1 cm (57 in × 31.9 in)
- Location: Manchester Art Gallery; Manchester

The Bromley Family is an 1844 portrait painting by the British artist Ford Madox Brown. It features a group portrait of members of the Bromley family, a middle-class family from Kent. Brown's first wife was Elizabeth Bromley, seen in the bottom right hand corner while her mother is to her left. Brown himself was a cousin of his wife who died of consumption in 1846. He produced this picture early in his career, but subsequently became associated with the Pre-Raphaelite Brotherhood. Today the painting is in the collection of the Manchester Art Gallery, which acquired it in 1947.

== See also ==
- List of paintings by Ford Madox Brown

== Bibliography ==
- Bendiner, Kenneth. Art of Ford Madox Brown. Pennsylvania State University Press, 2010.
- Simon, Robin. The Portrait in Britain and America. G.K. Hall, 1987.
- Treuherz, Julian. Pre-Raphaelite Paintings from Manchester City Art Galleries. Manchester City Art Gallery, 1993.
