= Royal Jubilee Exhibition =

Coordinates: 53°27′42″N 2°17′04″W

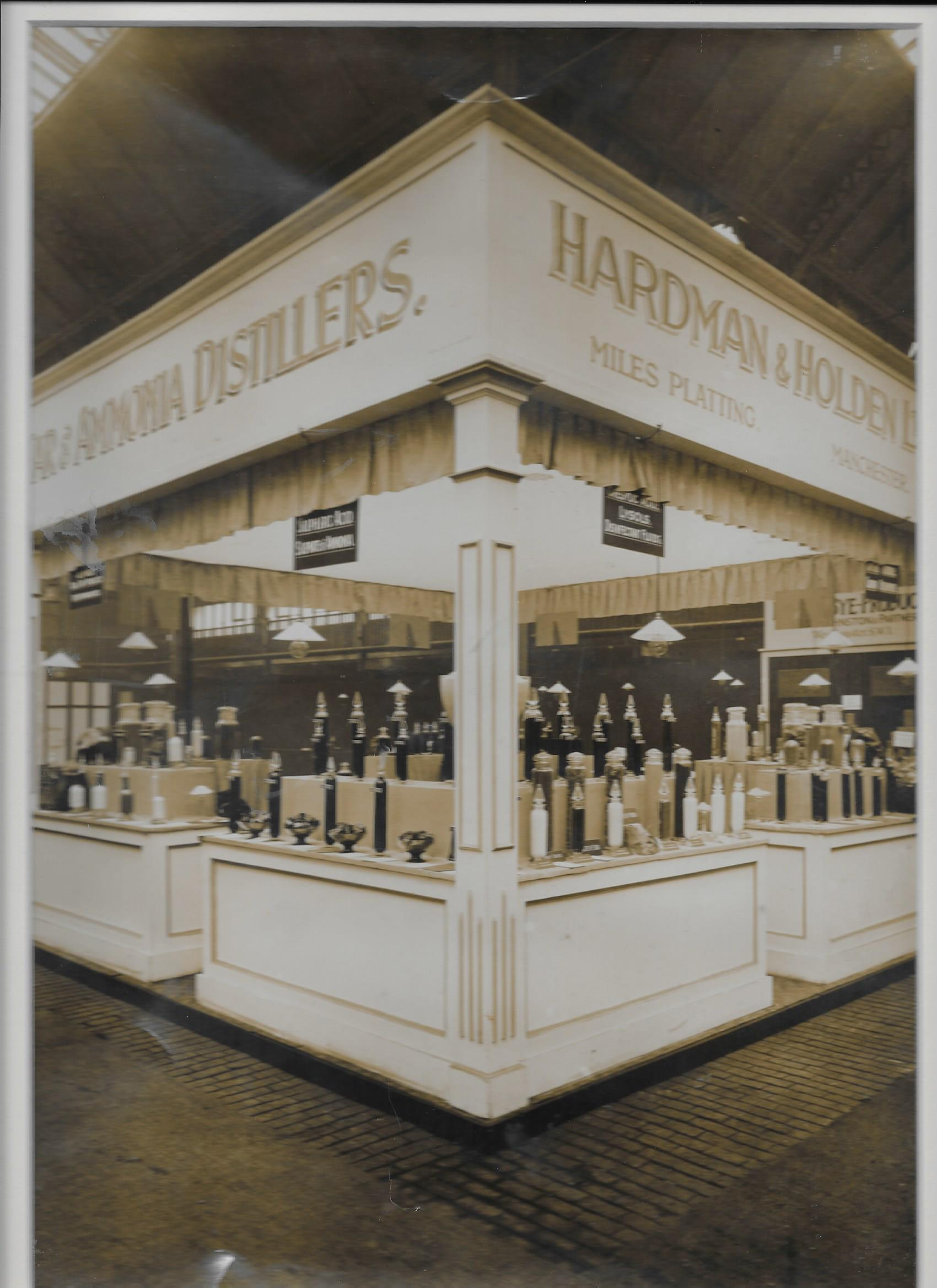
- Hardman & Holden stand at the exhibition

Overview
- BIE-class: Unrecognized exposition
- Name: Royal Jubilee Exhibition
- Visitors: 4.5 million

Location
- Country: United Kingdom of Great Britain and Ireland
- City: Manchester
- Venue: Royal Botanical Gardens

Timeline
- Opening: 3 May 1887

The Royal Jubilee Exhibition of 1887 was held in Old Trafford, Manchester, England, to celebrate the Golden Jubilee of Queen Victoria's accession. It was opened by Princess Alexandra, the Princess of Wales (wife of the Prince of Wales, later Edward VII) on 3 May 1887, and remained open for 166 days, during which time there were 4.5 million paying visitors, 74,600 in one day alone.

The site chosen for the construction of the purpose-built exhibition halls was the present-day White City retail park, then the Royal Botanical Gardens. Amusements such as tobogganing slides and a sports arena were also provided, and decorations were provided by Ford Madox Brown, assisted by Susan Dacre.

Designed by the architectural practice of Maxwell and Tuke, the buildings were constructed from cast iron gas pipes, and had large glazed areas. The main building was in the shape of a cross, with a central dome 150 feet (46 m) high and 90 feet (27 m) in diameter from which radiated four long galleries. Temporary sidings for the Manchester South Junction and Altrincham Railway were completed in 1886, to provide convenient access for visitors.

Maxwell and Tuke were also the architects of the Manchester Exhibition in 1888.

== See also ==
- List of works by Maxwell and Tuke
