= Hardman & Holden =

British chemical company

Hardman & Holden Limited was a British chemical company based in Manchester. They began as coal tar distillers, before diversifying into other chemicals.

The company was formed in 1892 by Josiah Hardman, a tar distiller from Milton, Staffordshire, and John James Holden of Higher Broughton, Salford to acquire the assets of the bankrupt chemical company Bouck & Co. Along with a third partner, George Henry Holden the company of Hardman & Holden was established in Clayton, Manchester. The company later moved to Valley Road, strategically located near to two local gas works that supplied raw materials via pipelines.

The company divested its tar distillation activities to Lancashire Tar Distillers in 1926 so as to concentrate on the production of cyanides and blue pigments made from ferrocyanides. In 1956, the company acquired C.J. Schofield Ltd.

In 1960, the company was acquired by Borax (Holdings) Ltd, which was itself acquired by RTZ in 1968.

The company of Hardman & Holden Ltd. was dissolved in 1973 and reformed under the name of Manox Ltd. In 1988, the company became part of RTZ chemicals before being acquired by Degussa AG in 1990. In 2005, Degussa closed its factory in Miles Platting, Manchester and transferred all production of blue ferrocyanide pigments to China.

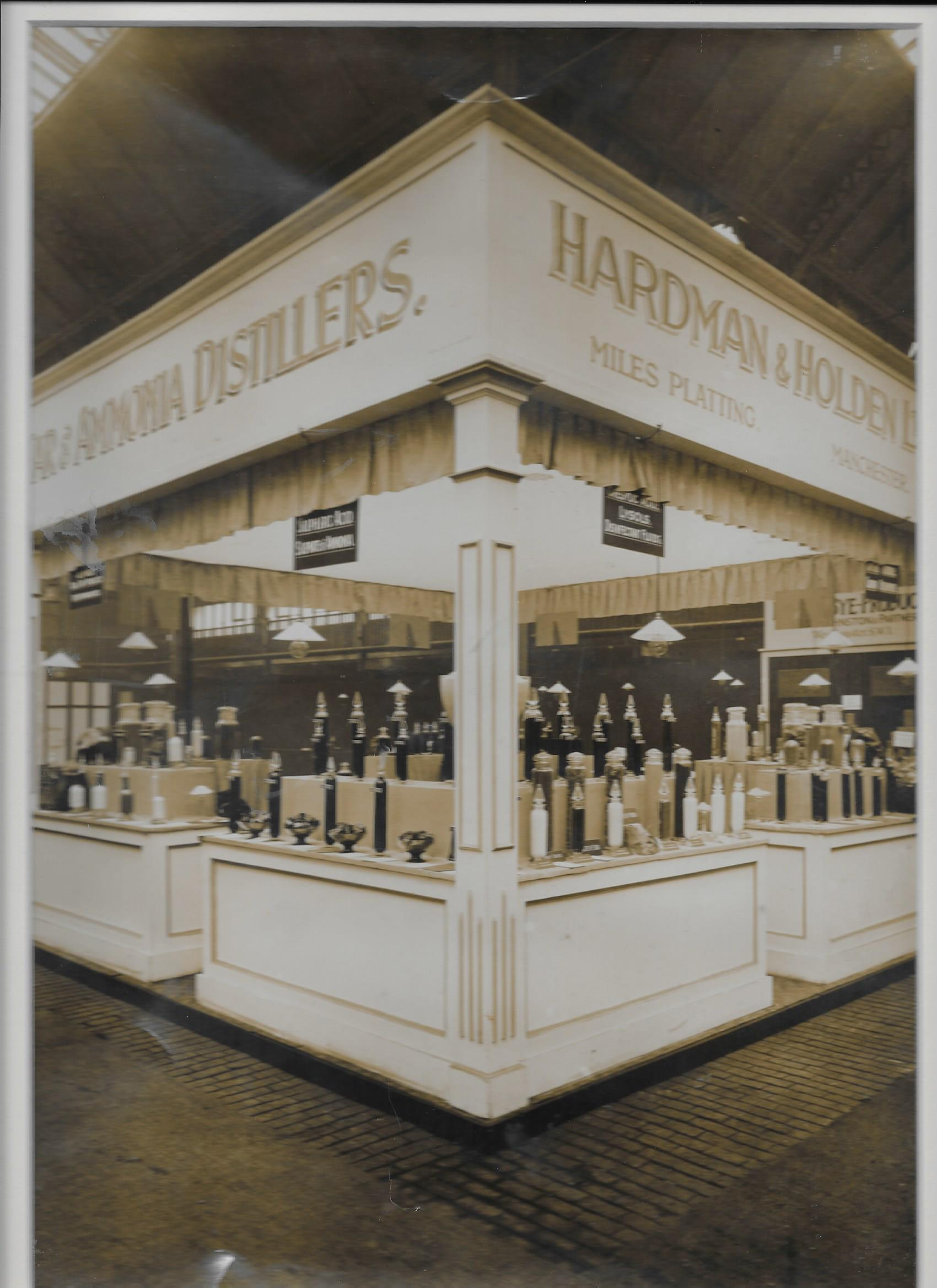
Stand at the Royal Jubilee Exhibition Manchester 1887
