= The Last of England (painting) =

Painting by Ford Madox Brown

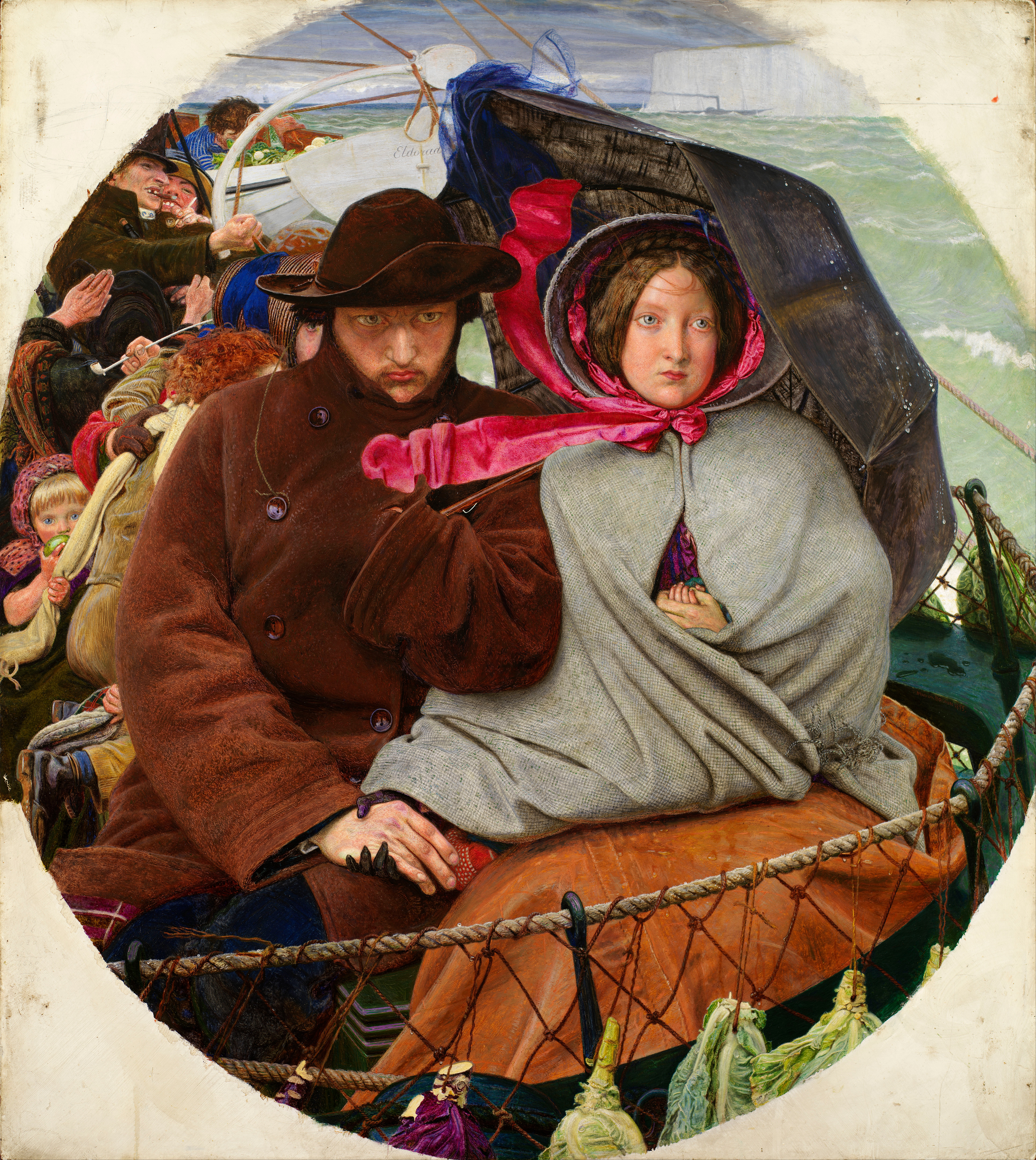
- Artist: Ford Madox Brown
- Year: c. 1850
- Medium: Oil on panel
- Movement: Pre-Raphaelite Brotherhood
- Dimensions: 82.5 cm × 75.0 cm (32.5 in × 29.5 in)
- Location: Birmingham Museum and Art Gallery, Birmingham

The Last of England is an 1855 oil-on-panel painting by Ford Madox Brown depicting two emigrants leaving England to start a new life in Australia with their baby. The painting has an oval format and is in the Birmingham Museum and Art Gallery.

== Background ==
Brown began the painting in 1852 inspired by the departure of his close friend, the Pre-Raphaelite sculptor, Thomas Woolner, who had left for Australia in July of that year. Emigration from England was at a peak, with over 350,000 people leaving that year. Brown, who at the time considered himself "very hard up and a little mad", was himself thinking of moving to India with his new family.

== Painting ==
The painting depicts a man and his wife seeing England for the last time. The two main figures, based on Brown and his wife, Emma, stare ahead, stony-faced, ignoring the white cliffs of Dover which can be seen disappearing behind them in the top right of the picture. They are huddled under an umbrella that glistens with sea-spray. The family's clothing and the bundle of books next to them indicate that they are middle class and educated, and so they are not leaving for the reasons that would force the emigration of the working classes; Brown's writing touched on the same theme:

The educated are bound to their country by quite other ties than the illiterate man, whose chief consideration is food and physical comfort

In the foreground a row of cabbages hang from the ship's rail, provisions for the long voyage. In the background are other passengers, including a pair of drunken men, one of whom was conceived by Brown as "shaking his fist and cursing the land of his birth". Also present are "an honest family of the green-grocer kind, father (mother lost), eldest daughter and younger children". The father is barely visible except for the pipe he holds; his daughter has her arm around a curly-haired boy. The fair-haired child eating an apple behind the man's shoulder was modeled on Brown and Emma's child, Catherine, who was born in 1850. The baby concealed under the cloak of the woman in the foreground, and whose hand she is clasping, is supposedly their second child, Oliver.

In order to mirror the harsh conditions in the painting Brown worked mostly outside in his garden, and was happy when the weather was poor – he recorded his feelings of delight when the cold turned his hand blue, as this was how he wanted it to appear in the painting. He was seen as strange by his neighbours who saw him out in all kinds of weather. He composed a short verse to accompany the painting in which the woman is depicted as hopeful for the future:

She grips his listless hand and clasps her child,
Through rainbow tears she sees a sunnier gleam,
She cannot see a void where he will be.

Brown's painting room was above a china shop at 33 High Street, Hampstead and sittings took place in the house's garden. His diary noted that the "ribbons of the bonnet took me 4 weeks to paint".

== Style ==
Although Ford Madox Brown was never a member of the Pre-Raphaelite Brotherhood, The Last of England, like many of his paintings, exhibits the characteristics of the movement in its luminous colour and minute focus on naturalistic detail. The format of the painting is nearly circular, a shape that emphasises the instability of the couple beginning a long journey on a turbulent sea. The art historian Nicholas Penny suggests that the scene is "viewed as though down a telescope", and that "this adds poignancy and even urgency to the beholder's situation". Brown's conception may have been influenced by the vogue at mid-century in the use of telescopes at seaside. The couple's fellow-passengers in the background are compressed, as if by a telephoto lens, into a foreshortened space.

== Versions ==
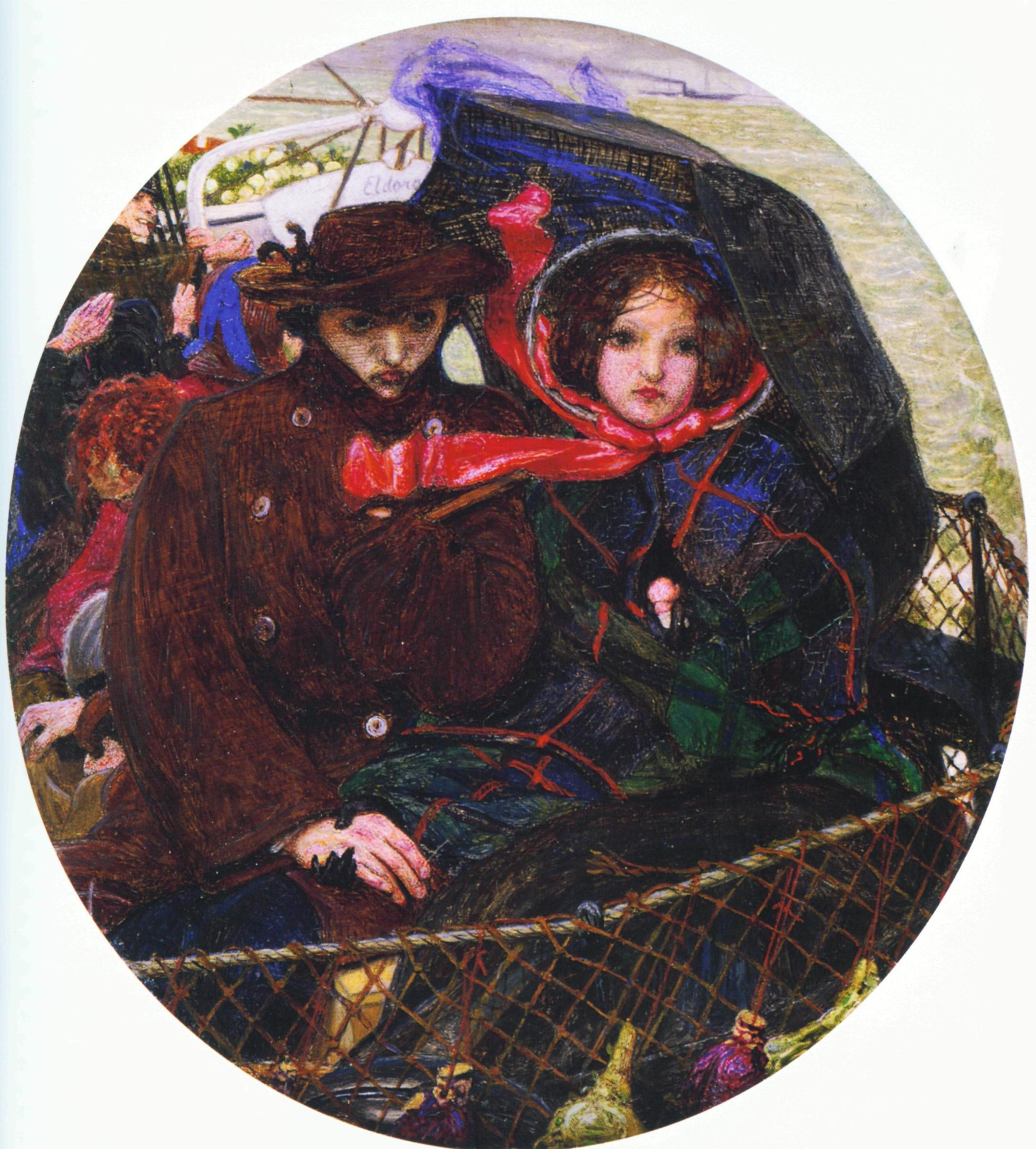
Finished study for the painting

Two finished versions of the picture exist, one in Birmingham Museum and Art Gallery and the other in the Fitzwilliam Museum in Cambridge. A reduced watercolour replica of the painting in Birmingham produced between 1864 and 1866 is in Tate Britain. A fully worked study also exists, and a detailed compositional drawing. The colouring varies among the different versions. All have a vertical oval shape, that was commonly used for half-length portraits, and perhaps recall the round Renaissance tondo format.

== Provenance ==
In March 1859 The Last Sight of England, as it was then known, was sold by Benjamin Windus to Ernest Gambart for 325 guineas (2019: £28,900).

== Popularity ==
The picture was voted Britain's eighth-favourite picture in a poll carried out by BBC Radio 4. In 2013 it was voted 32 out of 57 paintings chosen by the British public from national collections, which were used for Art Everywhere The World's Largest Public Art Exhibition.

== See also ==
- List of paintings by Ford Madox Brown
