= Ford Madox Brown =

British painter (1821–1893)

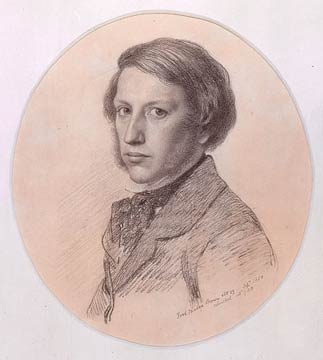
- Self-portrait 1850
- Born: 16 April 1821; Calais, France
- Died: 6 October 1893 (aged 72); London, England
- Resting place: St Pancras and Islington Cemetery
- Known for: Painting
- Notable work: Work (painting); The Last of England (painting)
- Movement: Pre-Raphaelite
- Spouses: Elizabeth Bromley (m. 1841; died 1846) Emma Hill (m. 1853; died 1890)
- Children: 5, including Lucy Madox Brown and Catherine Madox Brown

Ford Madox Brown (16 April 1821 – 6 October 1893) was a British painter of moral and historical subjects, notable for his distinctively graphic and often Hogarthian version of the Pre-Raphaelite style. Arguably, his most notable painting was Work (1852–1865). Brown spent the latter years of his life painting the twelve works known as The Manchester Murals, depicting Mancunian history, for Manchester Town Hall.

== Early life ==
Brown, on the left, with William Holman Hunt. Caricature by Max Beerbohm from Rossetti and His Circle.

Brown was the grandson of the medical theorist John Brown, founder of the Brunonian system of medicine. His great-grandfather was a Scottish labourer. His father Ford Brown served as a purser in the Royal Navy, including a period serving under Sir Isaac Coffin and a period on HMS Arethusa. He left the Navy after the end of the Napoleonic Wars.

In 1818, Ford Brown married Caroline Madox, of an old Kentish family. Brown's parents had limited financial resources, and they moved to Calais to seek cheaper lodgings, where their daughter Elizabeth Coffin was born in 1819 and their son Ford Madox Brown in 1821.

Brown's education was limited, as the family frequently moved between lodgings in the Pas-de-Calais and relatives in Kent, but he showed artistic talent in copying of Old Master prints. His father initially sought a naval career for his son, writing to his former captain Sir Isaac Coffin. The family moved to Bruges in 1835 so Brown could study at the academy under Albert Gregorius. Brown moved to Ghent in 1836 to continue his studies under Pieter van Hanselaere. He moved to Antwerp in 1837 to study under Gustaf Wappers. He continued to study in Antwerp after his mother's death in 1839. His sister died in 1840, and then his father in 1842.

== Works ==
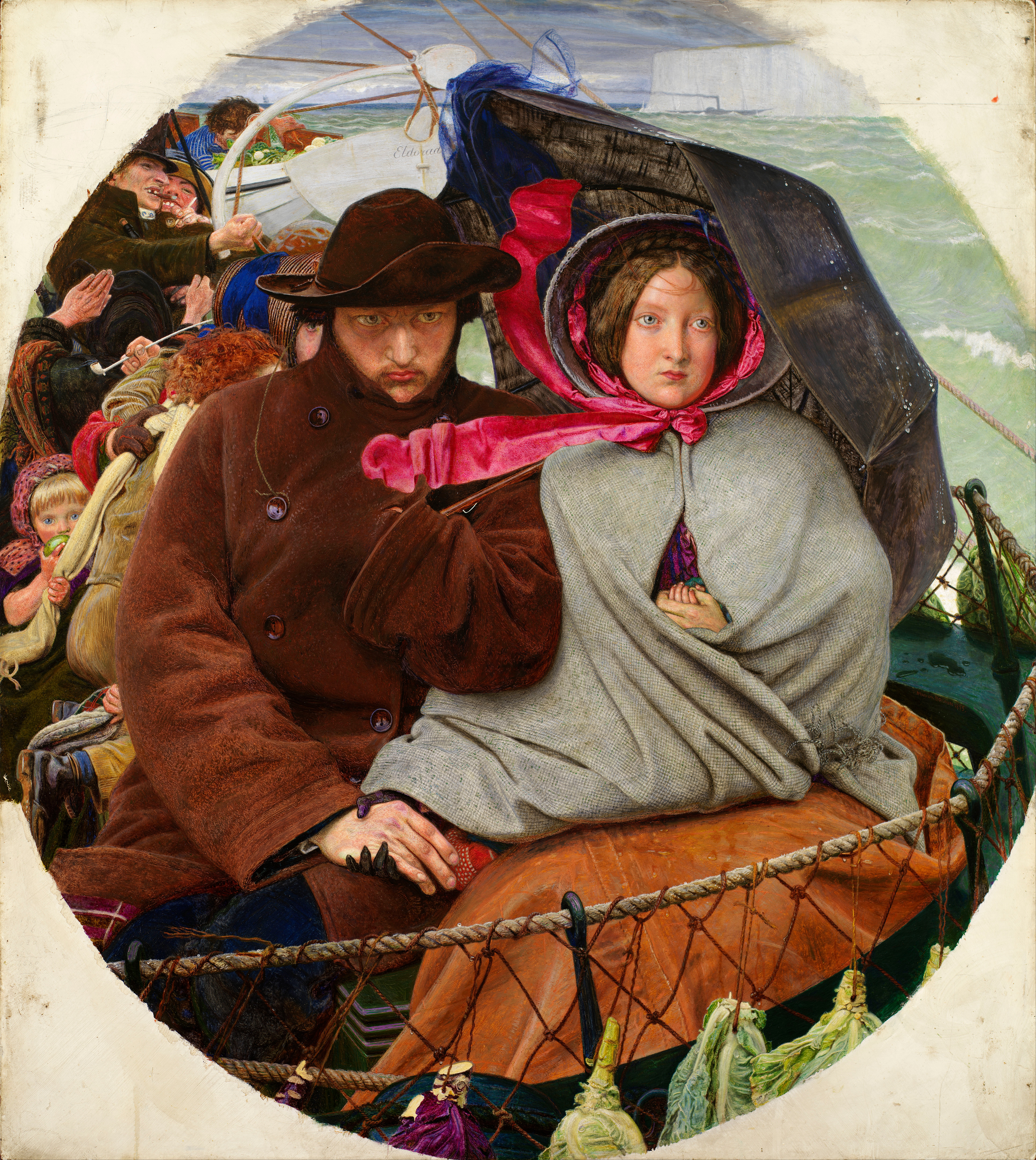
The Last of England depicting an emigrating couple, 1855

The Tate Gallery holds an early example of Brown's work, a portrait of his father. He first exhibited at the Royal Academy in 1840, a work inspired by Lord Byron's poem The Giaour (now lost) and then completed a version of The Execution of Mary, Queen of Scots, with his cousin and future wife Elizabeth Bromley as one of his models. He lived in Montmartre with his new wife and ageing father in 1841. He painted Manfred on the Jungfrau, inspired by Lord Byron's poem Manfred while he was in Paris.

In 1843 he submitted work to the Westminster Cartoon Competition, for compositions to decorate the new Palace of Westminster. His entry, 'The Body of Harold Brought before William', was not successful. His early works were, however, greatly admired by the young Dante Gabriel Rossetti, who asked him to become his tutor. Through Rossetti, Brown came into contact with the artists who went on to form the Pre-Raphaelite Brotherhood. Though closely linked to them, he was never actually a member of the brotherhood itself, but adopted the bright colours and realistic style of William Holman Hunt and John Everett Millais. He was also influenced by the works of Holbein that he saw in Basel in 1845, and by Friedrich Overbeck and Peter Cornelius, whom he met in Rome in 1845–46.

Brown struggled to make his mark in the 1850s, with his paintings failing to find buyers, and he considered emigrating to India. In 1852 he started work on two of his most significant works.

One of his most famous images is The Last of England, painted from 1852 to 1855, which was sold in March 1859 for 325 guineas (2010: £24,000). It depicts a pair of stricken emigrants as they sail away on the ship that will take them from England forever. It was inspired by the departure of the Pre-Raphaelite sculptor Thomas Woolner, who had left for Australia. In an unusual tondo format, the painting is structured with Brown's characteristic linear energy, and emphasis on apparently grotesque and banal details, such as the cabbages hanging from the ship's side. The husband and wife are portraits of Brown and his second wife Emma.

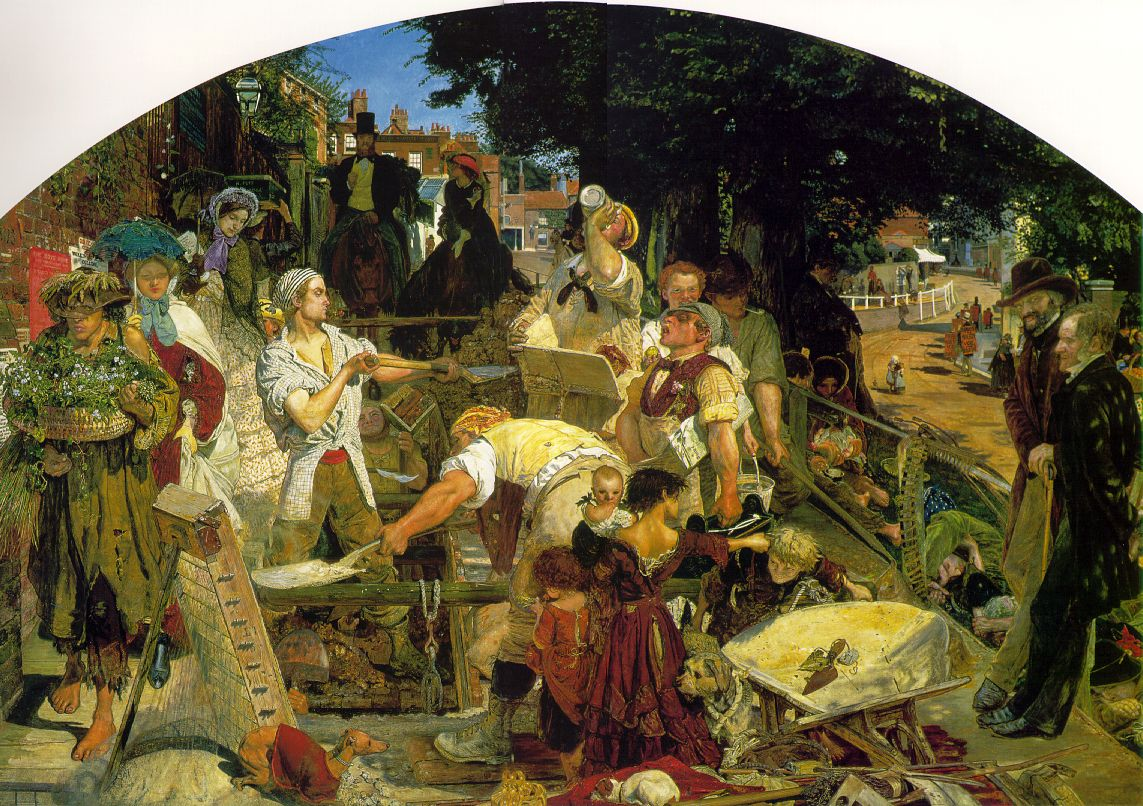
Work (1852–1865) is Brown's best known painting

Brown's most important painting is Work (1852–1865), begun in Hampstead in 1852 and which he showed at his retrospective exhibition in 1865. Thomas Plint advanced funds to enable Brown to complete the work, in anticipation of obtaining the finished painting, but died in 1861 before the painting had been completed. In this painting, Brown attempted to depict the totality of the mid-Victorian social experience in a single image, depicting 'navvies' digging up a road (The Mount, off Heath Street in Hampstead, north London) and disrupting the old social hierarchies in the process. The image erupts into proliferating details from the dynamic centre of the action, as the workers tear a hole in the road – and, symbolically, in the social fabric. Each character represents a particular social class and role in the modern urban environment.

Brown wrote a catalogue to accompany the special exhibition of Work. This publication included an extensive explanation of Work that nevertheless leaves many questions unanswered. Brown's concern with the social issues addressed in Work prompted him to open a soup kitchen for Manchester's hungry, and to attempt to aid the city's unemployed to find work by founding a labour exchange.

Brown found patrons in the north of England, including Plint, George Rae from Birkenhead, John Miller from Liverpool, and James Leathart from Newcastle. By the late 1850s he had lost patience with the poor reception he received at the Royal Academy and ceased to show his works there, rejecting an offer from Millais to support his becoming an associate member. He founded the Hogarth Club in 1858, with William Morris, Edward Burne-Jones, and his former pupil Rossetti. After a successful period of a few years, the club reached over 80 members, including several prominent members of the Royal Academy, but Brown resigned in 1860, and the club collapsed in 1861.

From the 1860s, Brown also designed furniture and stained glass. He was a founder partner of William Morris's design company, Morris, Marshall, Faulkner & Co., in 1861, which dissolved in 1874 with Morris continuing on his own. He was a close friend of the landscape artist Henry Mark Anthony.

Brown's major achievement after Work was The Manchester Murals, a cycle of twelve paintings in the Great Hall of Manchester Town Hall depicting the history of the city. Brown would be 72 by the time he finished the murals. In total, he took six years perfecting the murals, which were his last major work.

== Family ==
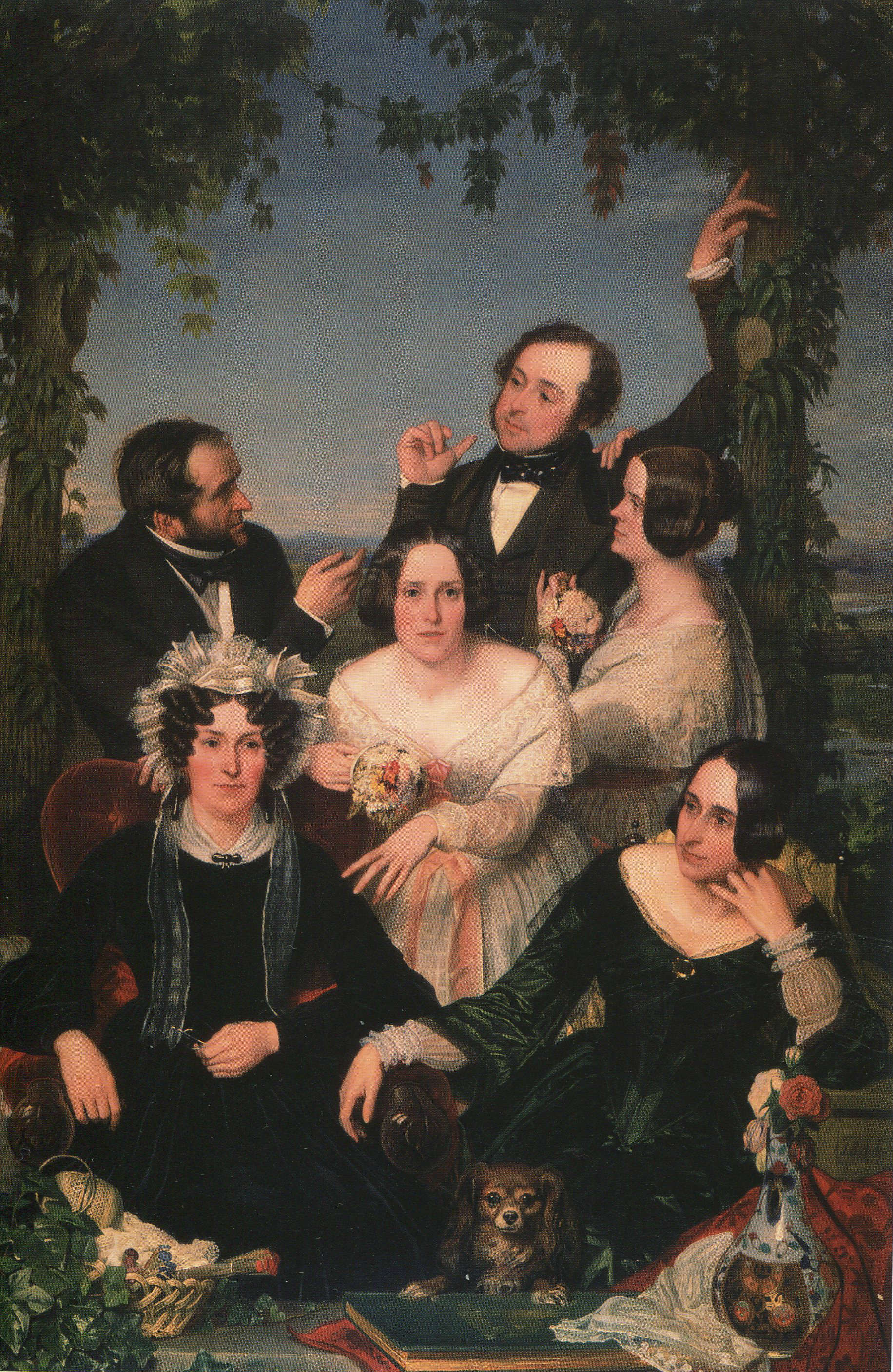
The Bromley Family. Brown's first wife Elizabeth, lower right, 1844

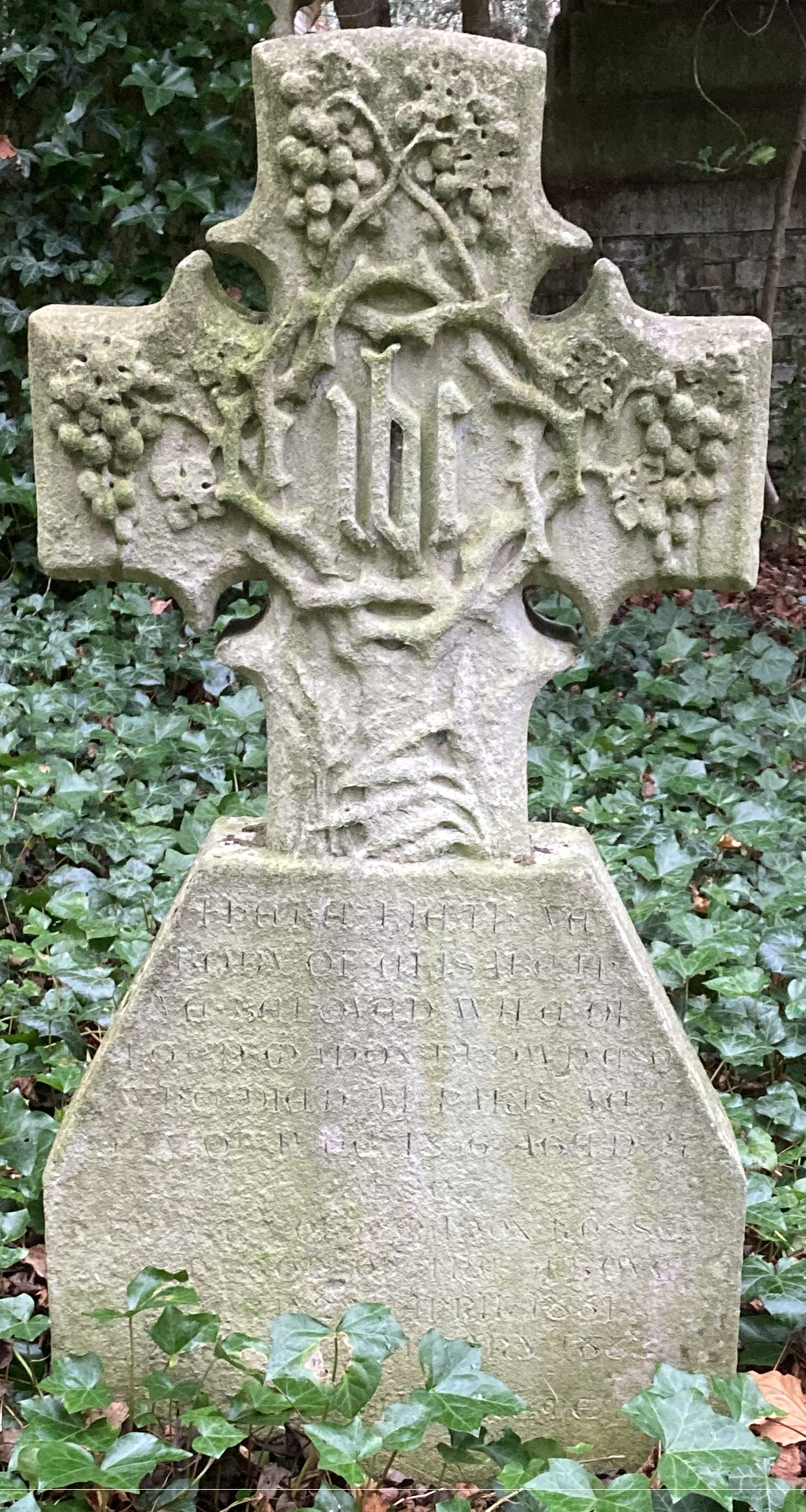
Grave of Elizabeth Madox Brown in Highgate Cemetery

Ford Madox Brown was married twice. His first wife Elizabeth Bromley was his first cousin, the daughter of his mother's sister Mary. They were married in Meopham in Kent in April 1841, shortly before his 20th birthday and less than a year after the sudden death of his sister Elizabeth. They lived in Montmartre in 1841 with Brown's invalid father who died the following summer.

Their first child died young as an infant in November 1842. Their daughter Emma Lucy was born in 1843 and the family moved back to England in 1844. They travelled to Rome in 1845 to alleviate the illness of his wife, who was suffering from consumption (pulmonary tuberculosis). She died in Paris in June 1846, aged 27, on the journey back to England from Rome, and was buried on the western side of Highgate Cemetery. Christina Rossetti, Elizabeth Siddal and other members of the Rossetti family were later buried alongside.

Emma Hill became a frequent model for Brown from 1848; for example, she is the wife in The Last of England. She became his mistress, and they shared a house in London, but social convention discouraged him from marrying an illiterate daughter of a bricklayer. Their daughter Catherine Emily was born in 1850, and eventually they were married at St Dunstan-in-the-West in April 1853. Ford leased a house in Fitzroy Square.

Their son, Oliver Madox Brown (1855–1874) (known as Nolly) showed promise both as an artist and poet, but died of blood poisoning before his maturity. The death of Nolly was a crushing blow for Brown, and he kept a room for his son's belongings as a shrine. Another son Arthur was born in September 1856. Brown used Arthur as the model for the baby held by a ragged girl in the foreground of Work, but he died aged only ten months old in July 1857.

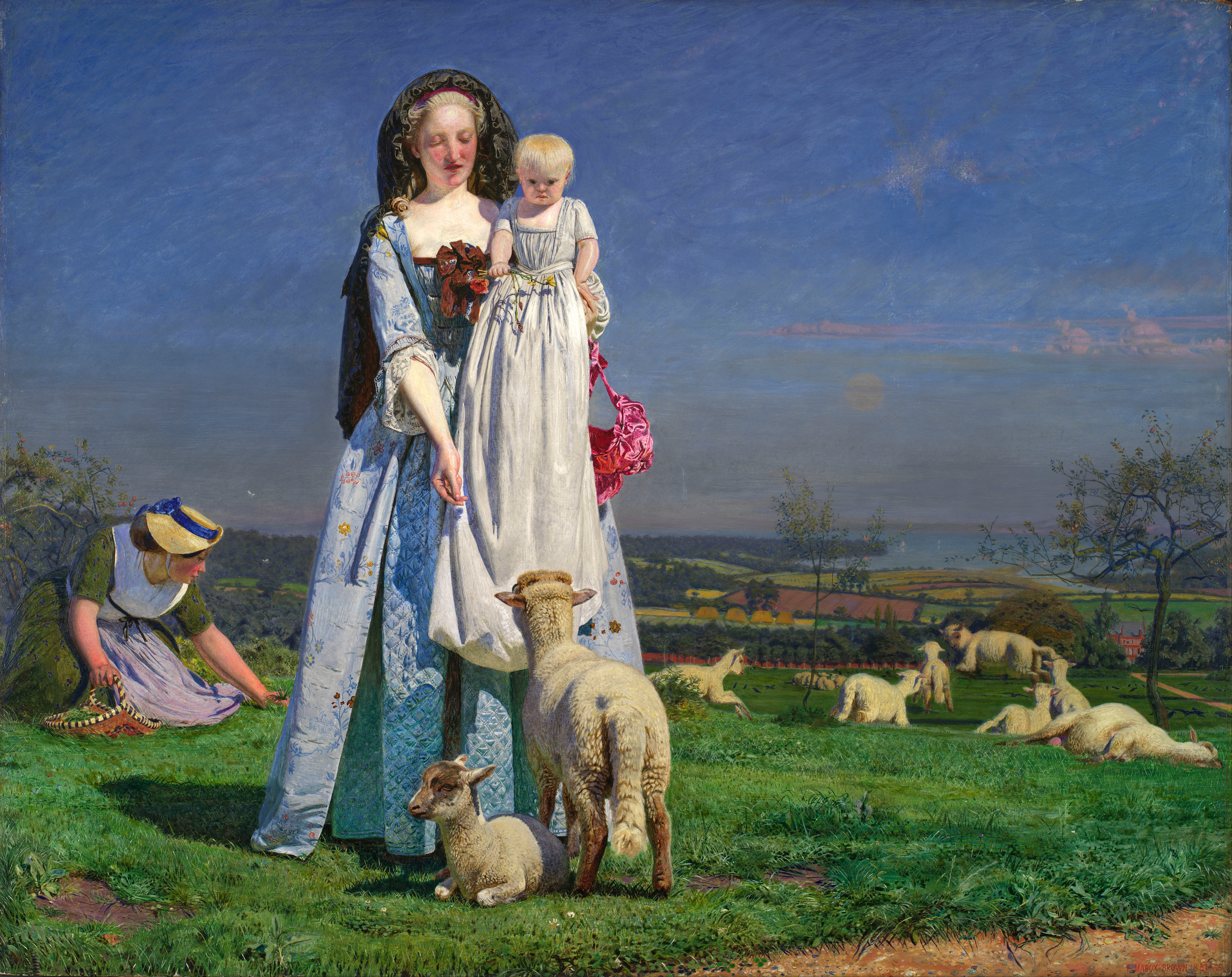
The Pretty Baa-Lambs. Brown's mistress and later wife Emma and second daughter Cathy in 1851

His daughters Lucy Madox Brown and Catherine Madox Brown were also competent artists. Lucy married William Michael Rossetti in 1874. Catherine, married Francis Hueffer; through Catherine, Brown was the grandfather of novelist Ford Madox Ford and great-grandfather of Labour Home Secretary Frank Soskice.

== Death ==
Brown's second wife died in October 1890, and he died in Primrose Hill, north London, in 1893. He is buried in the St Pancras and Islington Cemetery in East Finchley. He was given a secular funeral, and the funeral oration was delivered by the American Moncure D. Conway, the secularist after whom Conway Hall was later named.

The Brown family

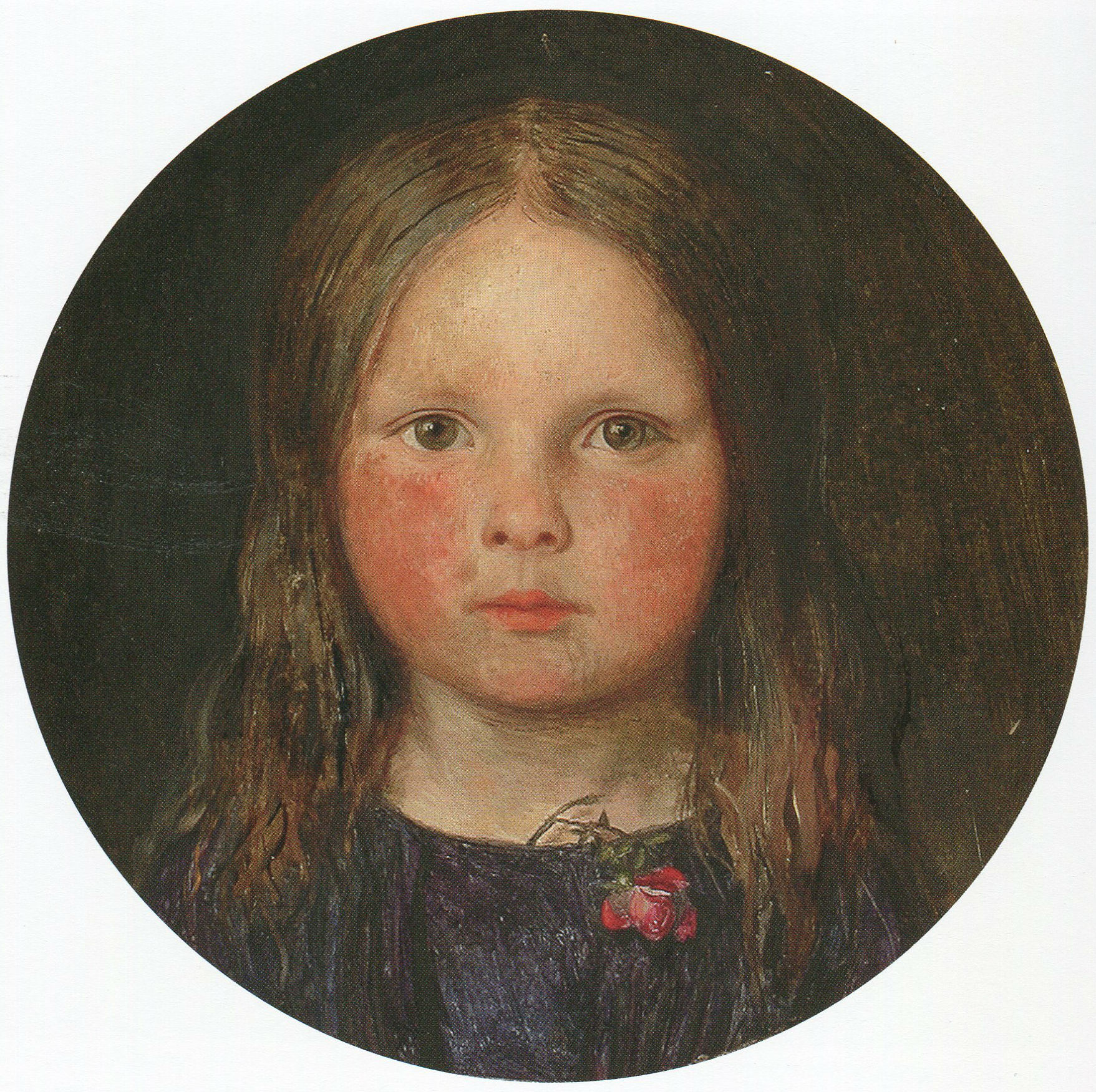
Brown's first surviving daughter Lucy in 1849

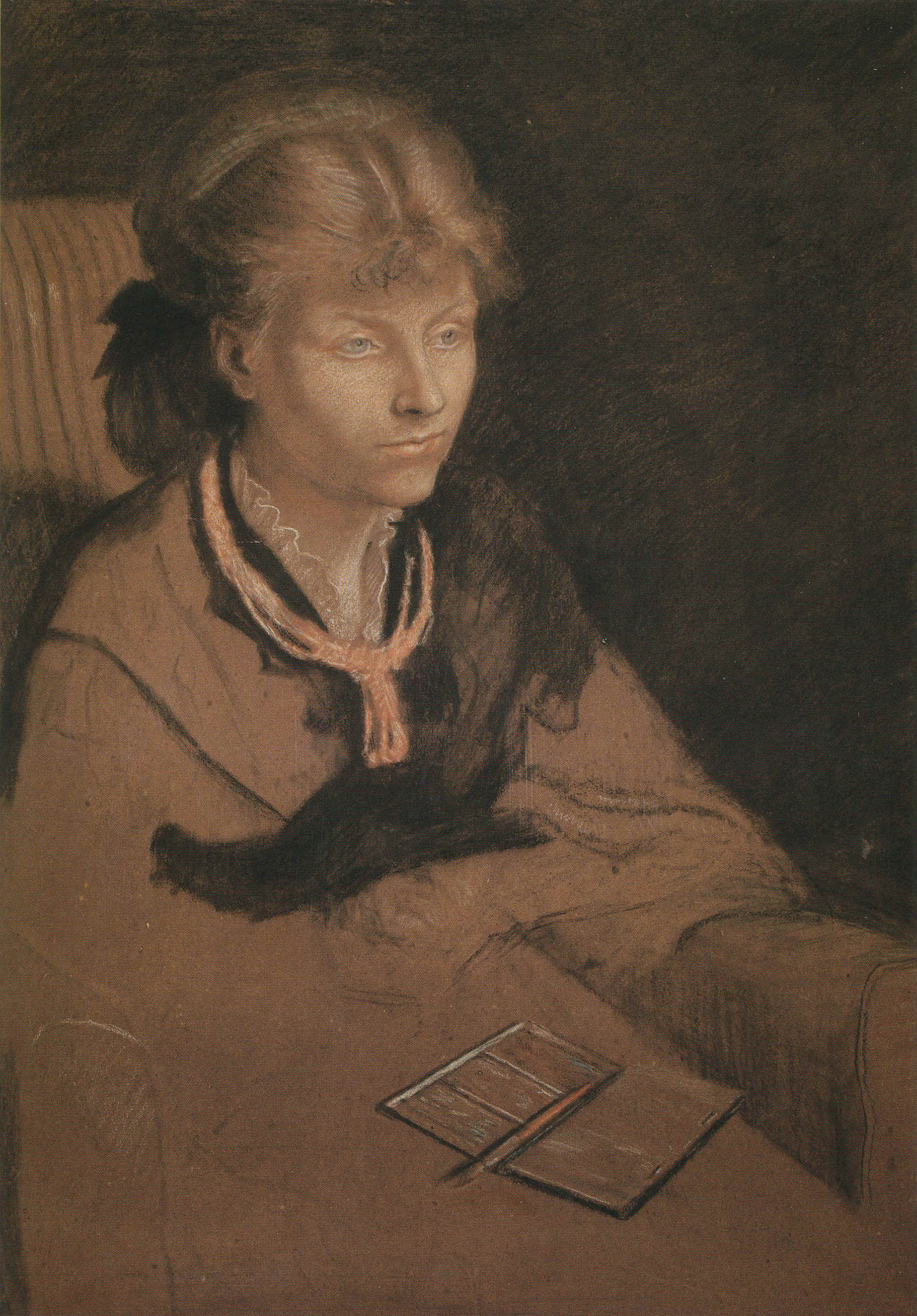
Catherine Madox Brown

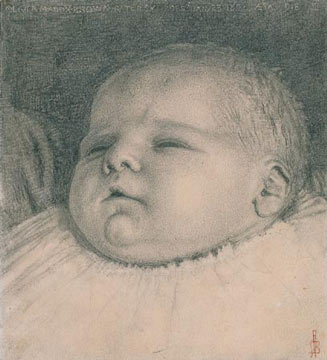
Oliver in 1855

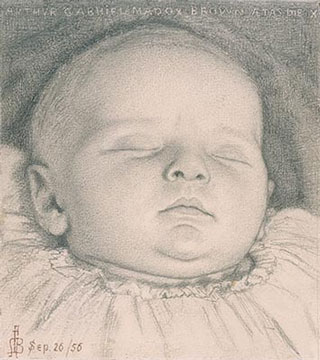
Arthur in 1856

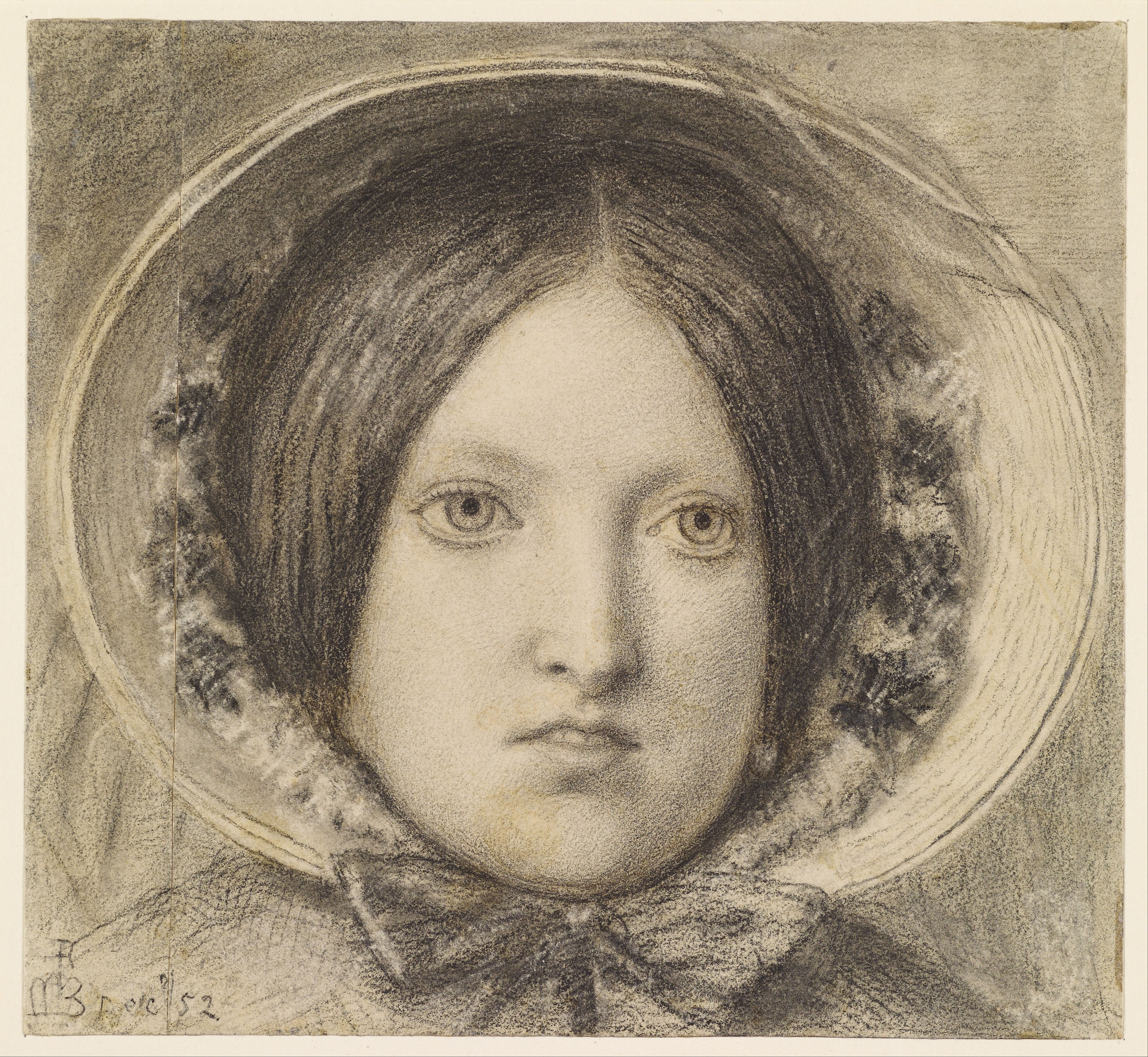
Emma in 1852 (study for The Last of England)

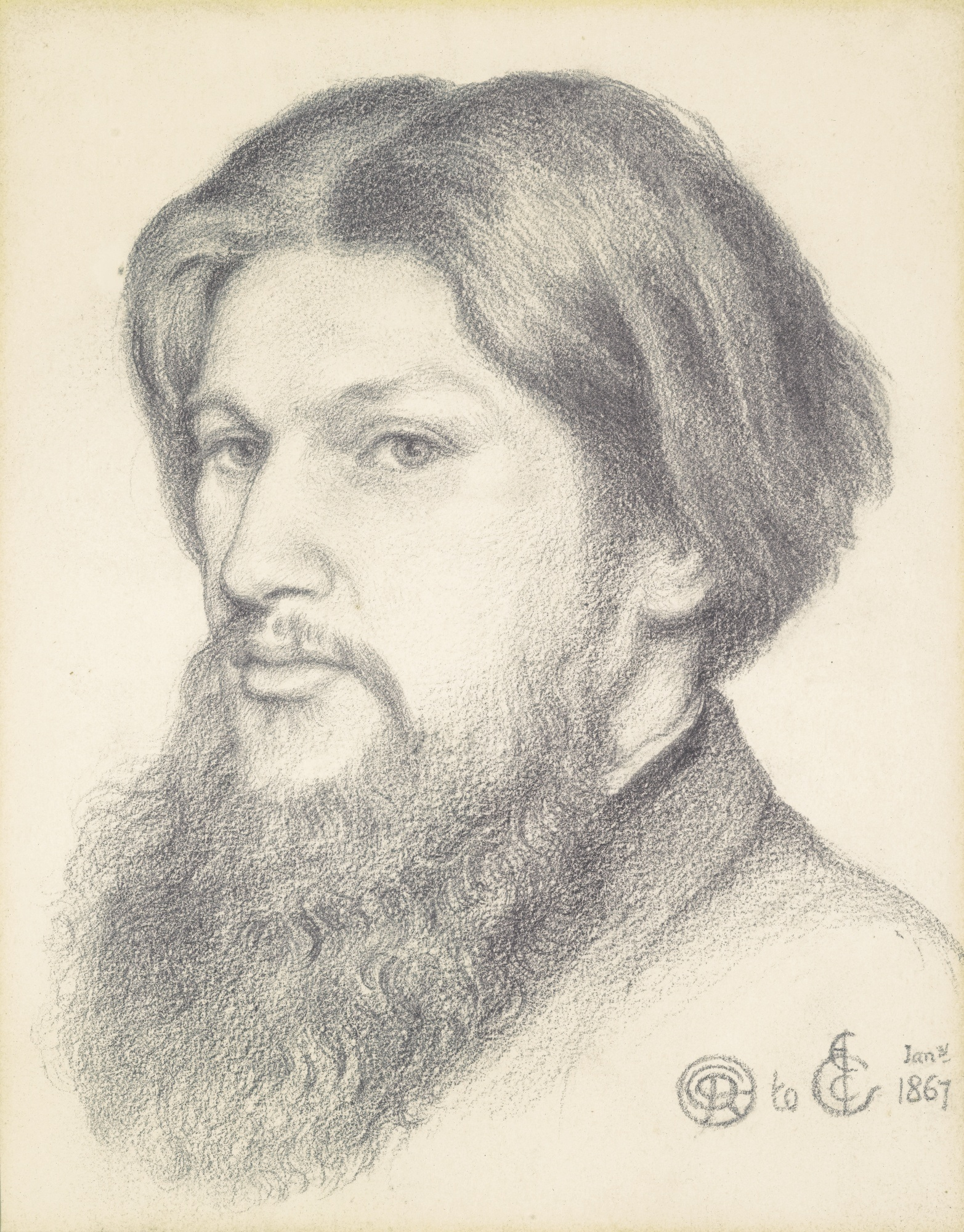
Ford Madox Brown, 1867, drawn by Dante Gabriel Rossetti

== Legacy ==
The Ford Madox Brown, a J D Wetherspoon pub in Oxford Road, Manchester, is named after Ford Madox Brown. It states on the Wetherspoon's website that "This J D Wetherspoon pub is named after the much-travelled artist Ford Madox Brown, a one-time resident of Victoria Park, a suburb south of the pub." The pub opened in 2007.

== Gallery ==
Ford Madox Brown's works

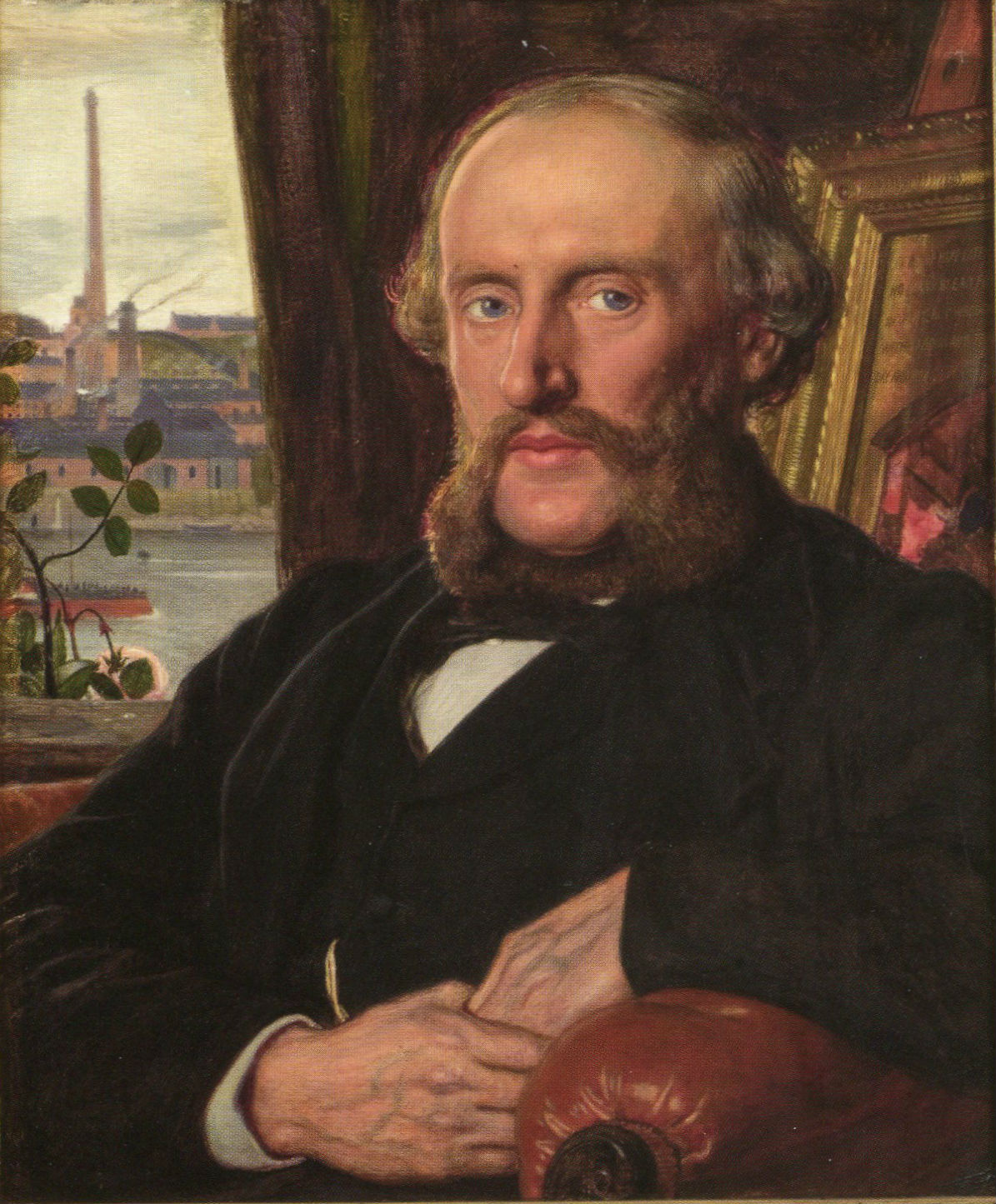
James Leathart

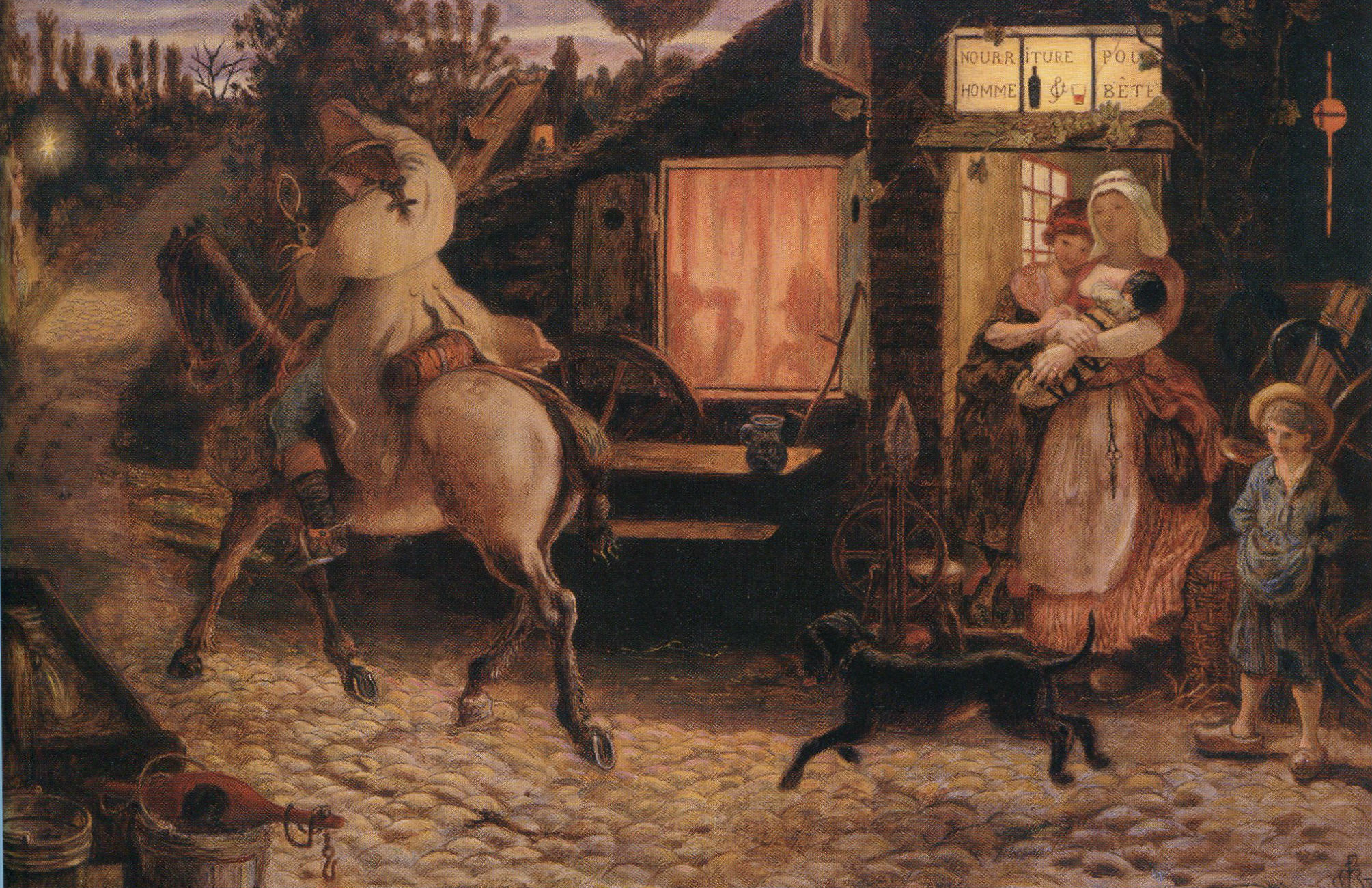
Traveller, 1868

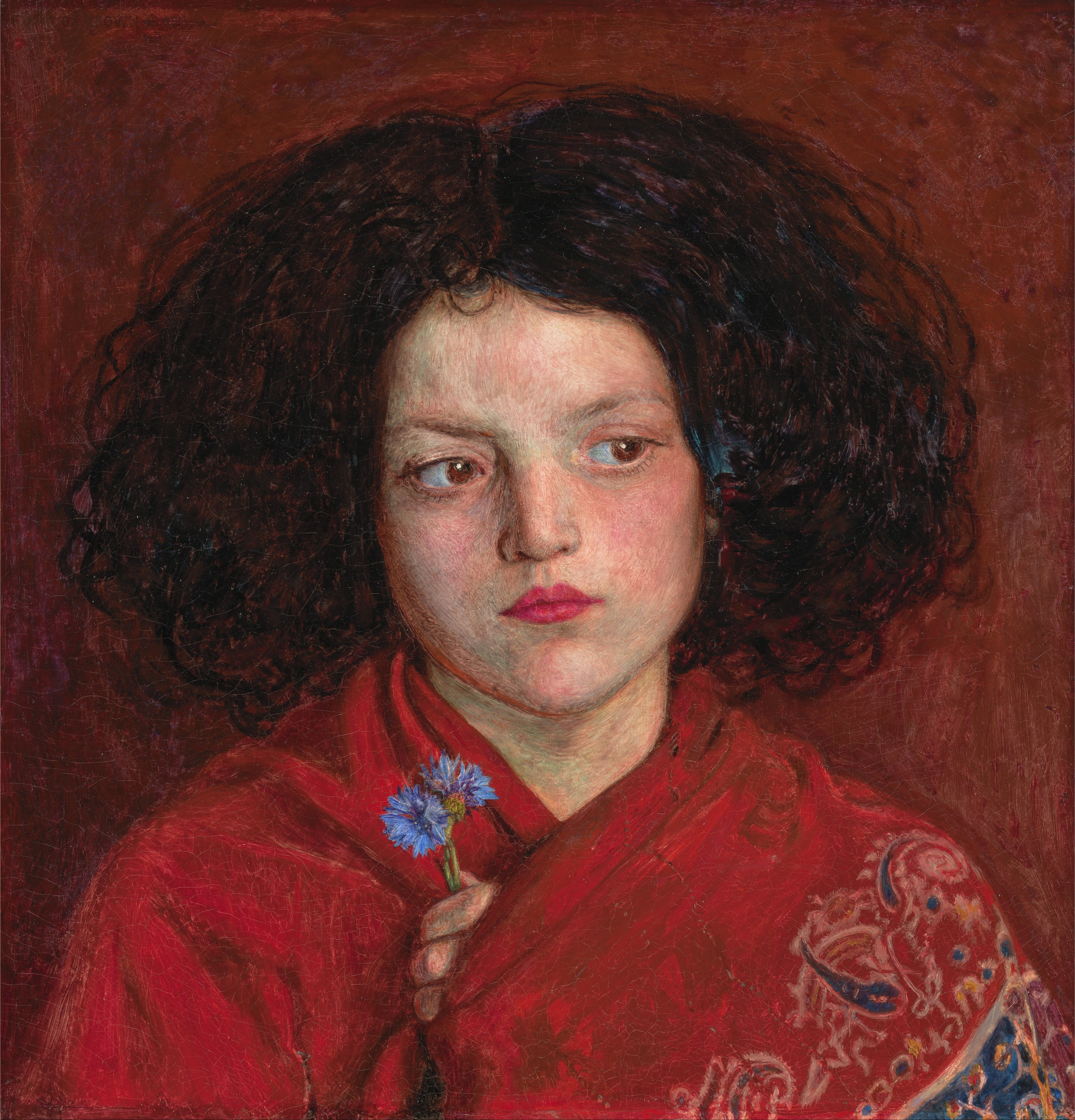
The Irish Girl, 1860

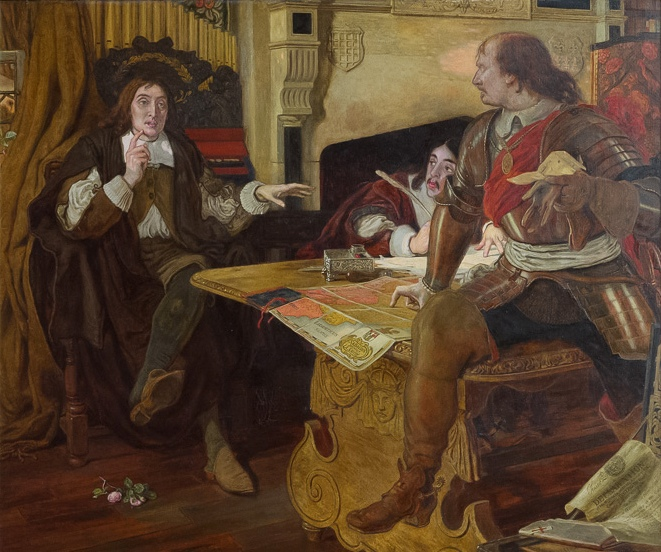
Cromwell, Protector of the Vaudois, 1877

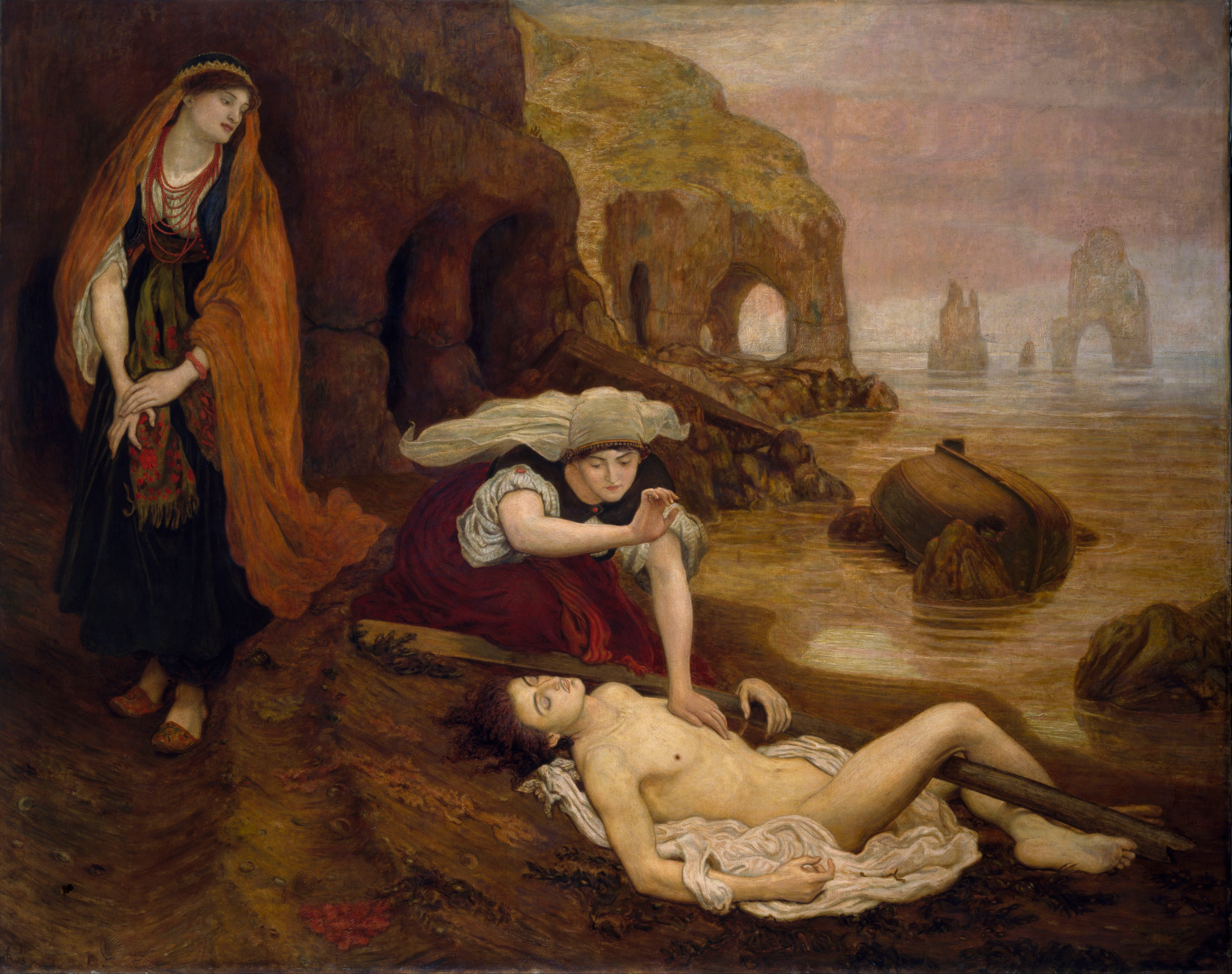
Finding of Don Juan by Haidee, 1873

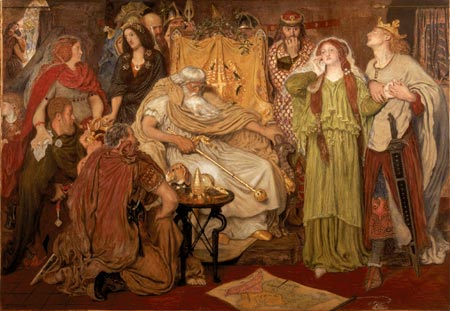
Cordelia's Portion

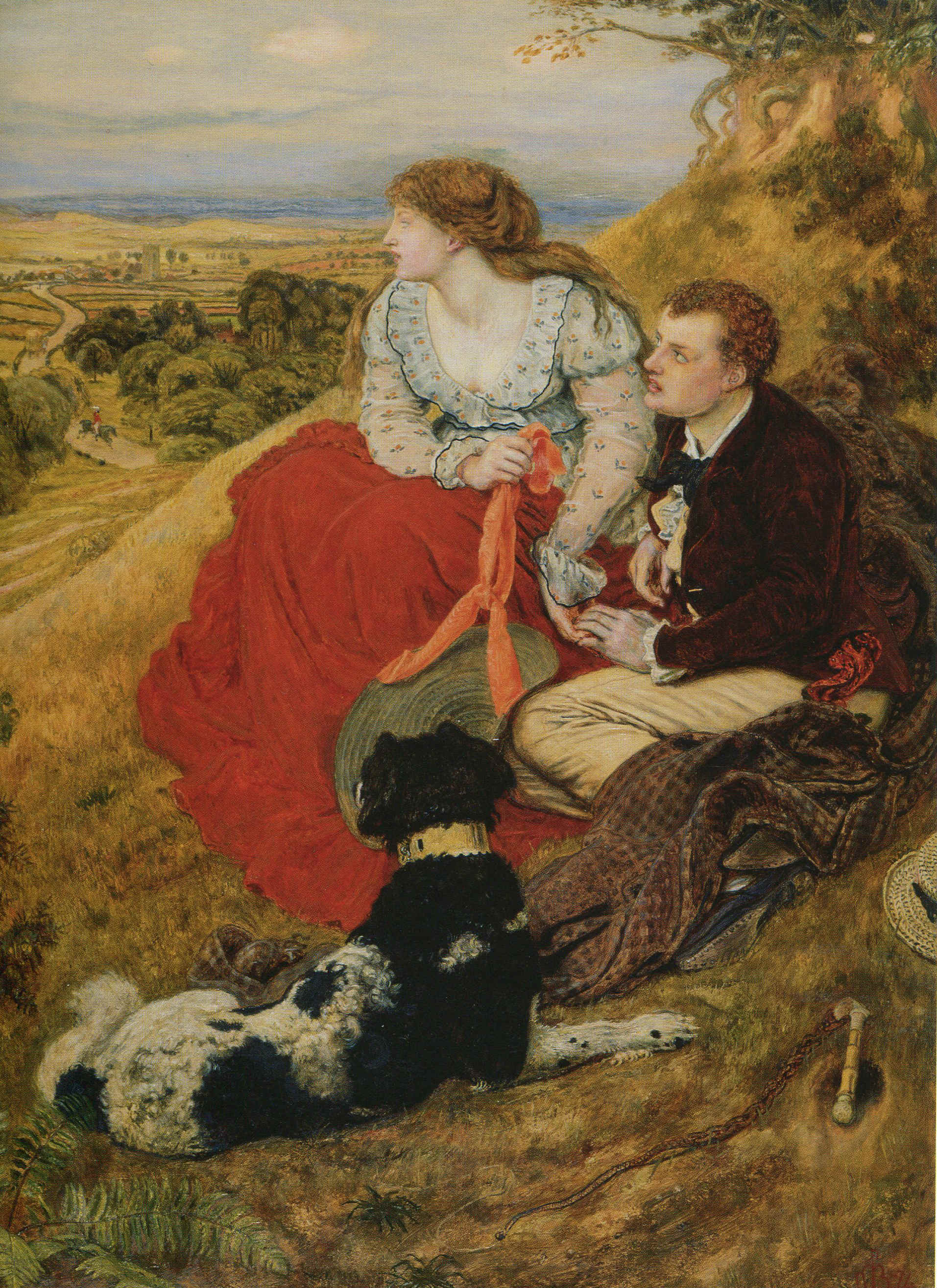
Byron's Dream

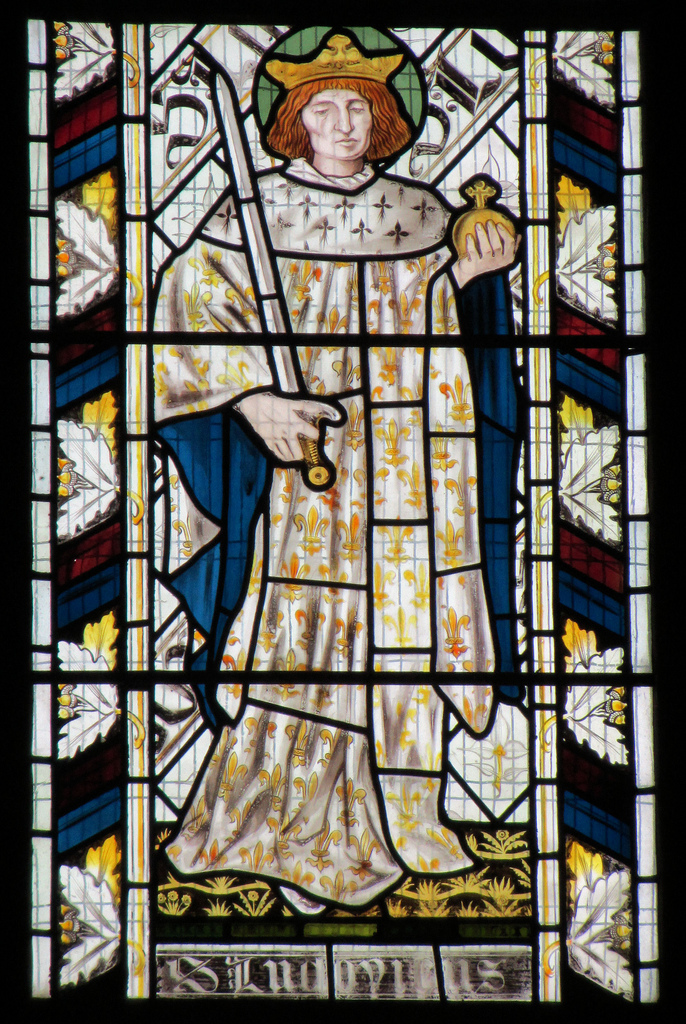
The French saint King Louis IX in the stained glass of the East window of All Saints Church, Cambridge

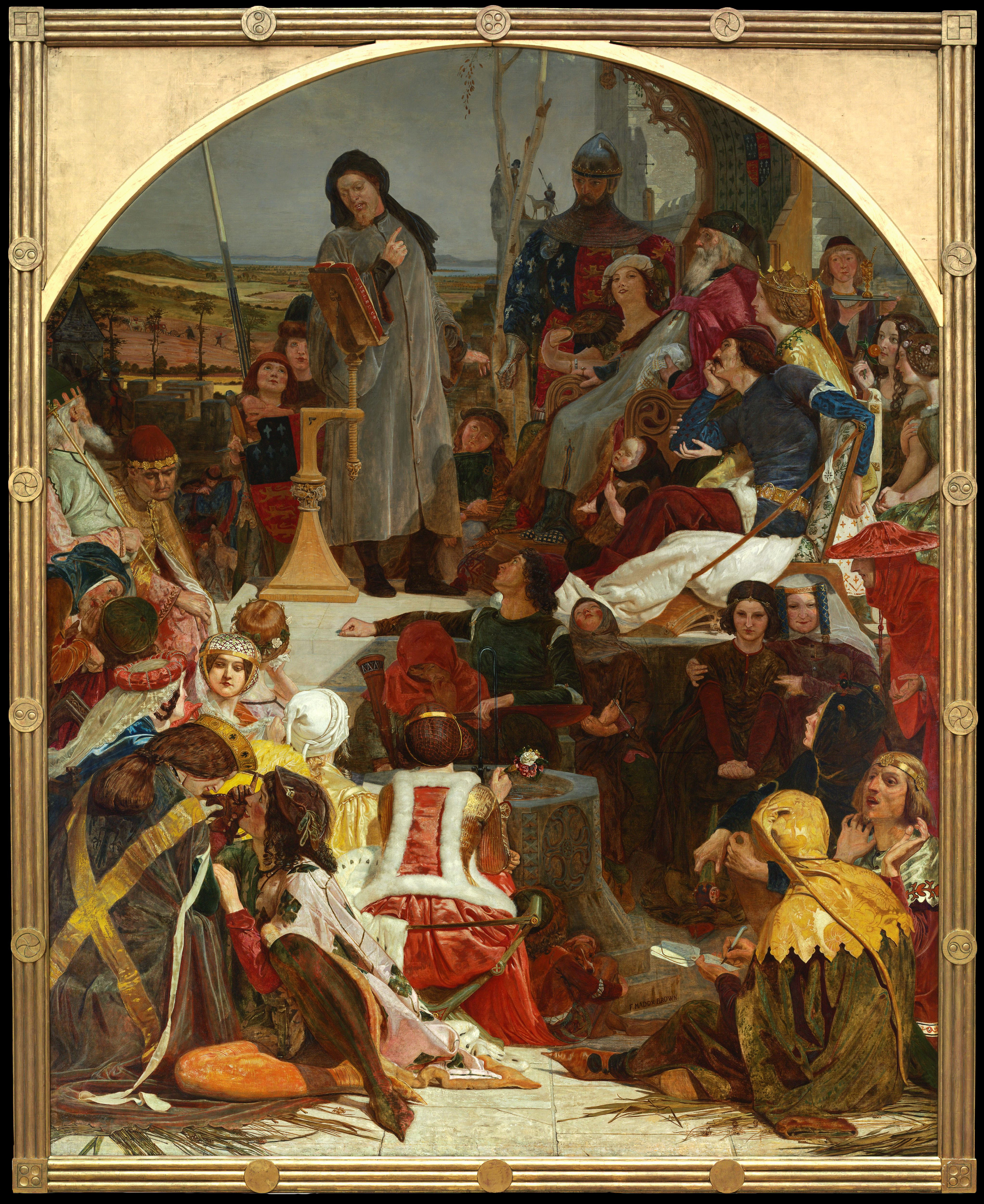
Chaucer at the Court of Edward III, oil on canvas painting by Ford Madox Brown, 1847–1851, Art Gallery of New South Wales

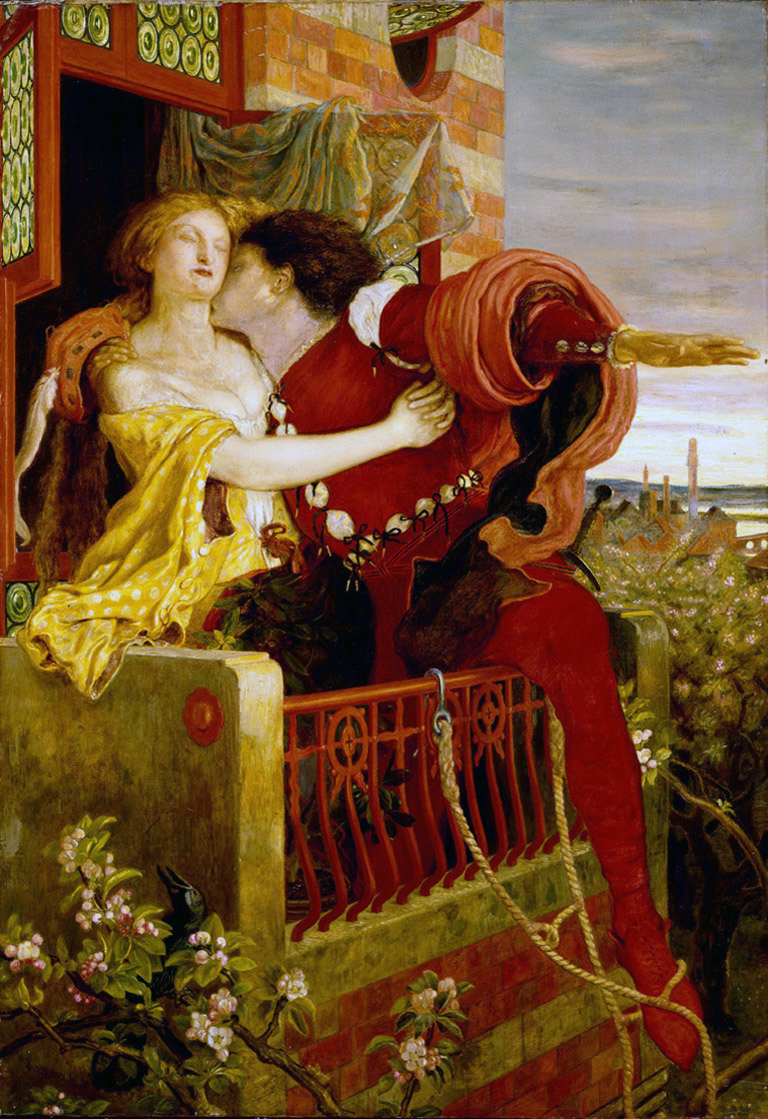
Romeo and Juliet parting on the balcony in Act III. Delaware Art Museum, 1870

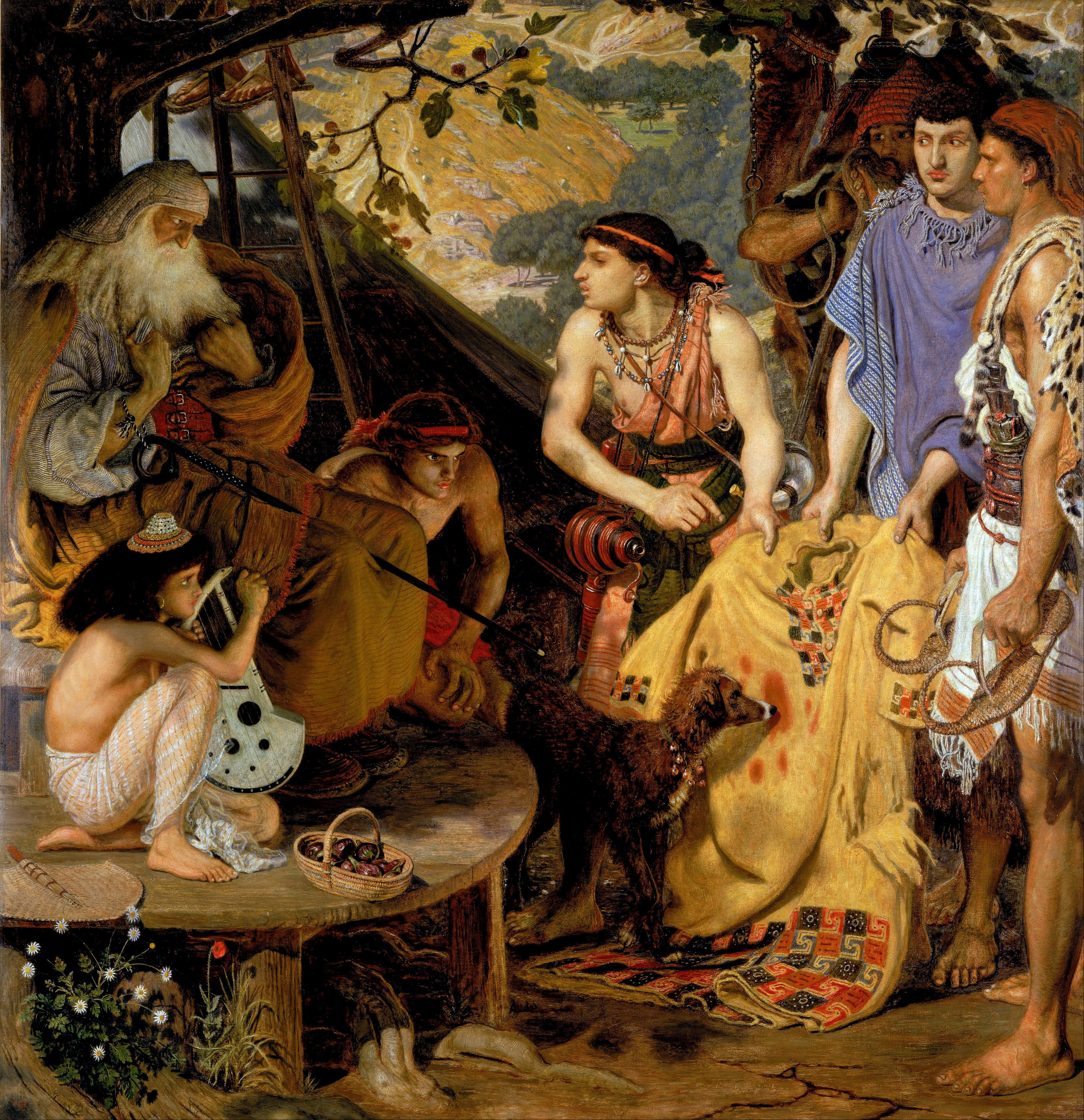
Brown's Jacob and Joseph's Coat at Museo de Arte de Ponce, Ponce, Puerto Rico

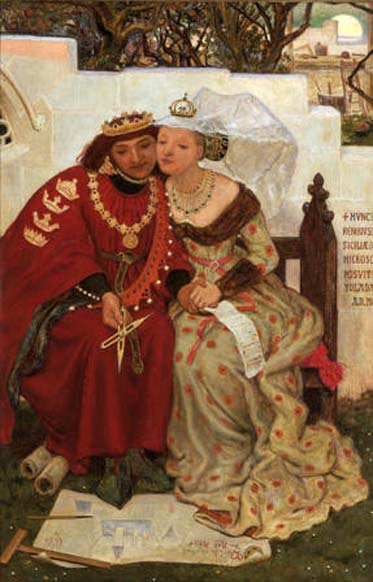
King Rene's Honeymoon, 1864, an imaginary scene in the life of the art-loving medieval king René of Anjou.

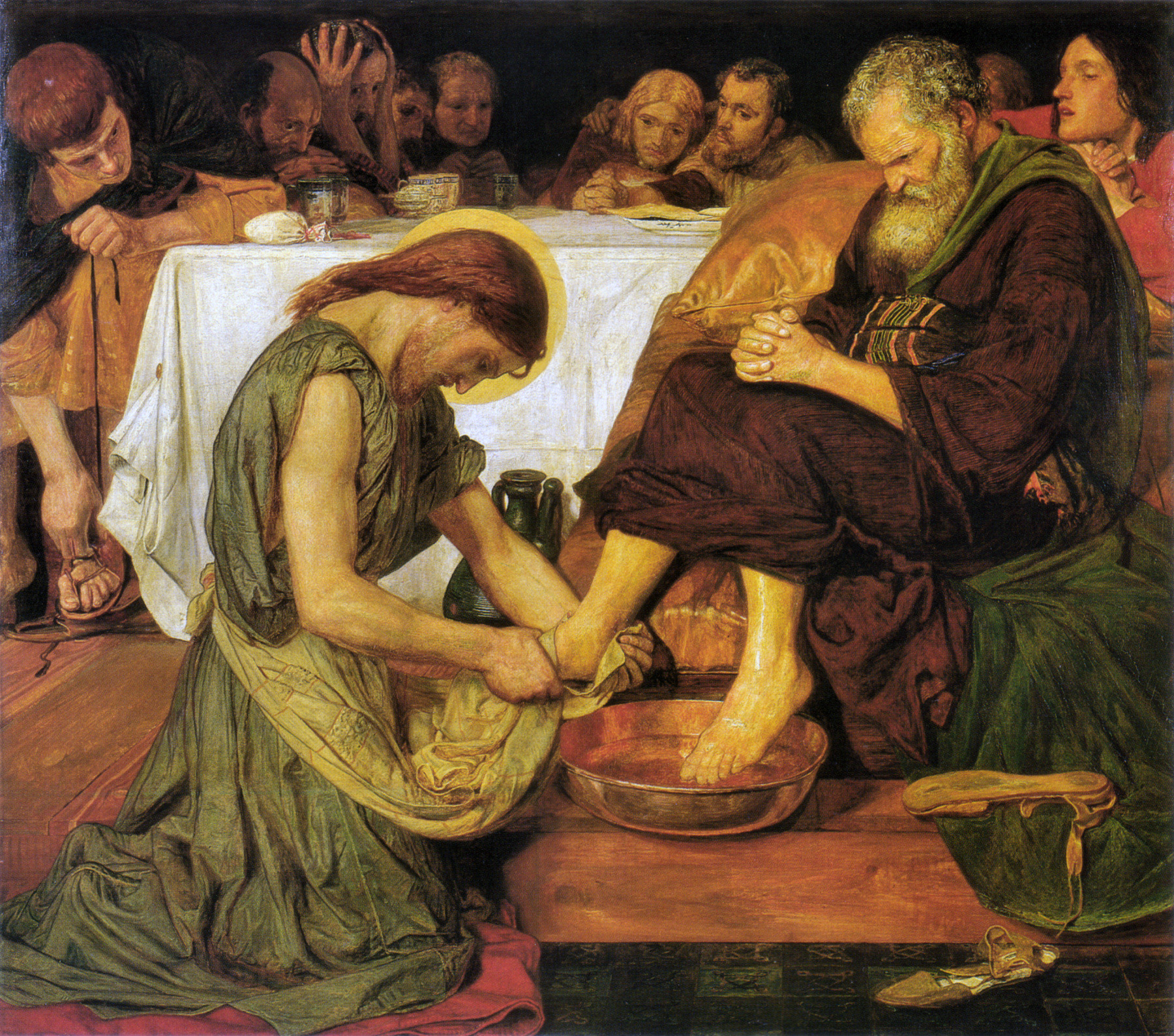
Jesus washing Peter's feet

== See also ==
- List of paintings by Ford Madox Brown
- British art
- English art

== Sources ==
External videos
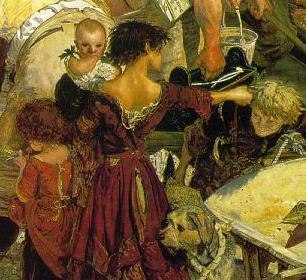
- Pre-Raphaelites: Curator's choice – Ford Madox Brown's Work, Tate Gallery

- Virginia Surtees (ed.), The Diary of Ford Madox Brown, 1981, ISBN 0-300-02743-5.
- Teresa Newman & Ray Watkinson, Ford Madox Brown and the Pre-Raphaelite Circle, Chatto & Windus, 1991, ISBN 978-0-70113-186-9.
- Kenneth Bendiner, Ford Madox Brown: Il Lavoro, Turin: Lindau, 1991.
- Kenneth Bendiner, The Art of Ford Madox Brown, University Park, PA: Penn State Press, 1998.
- Tessa Sidey (ed.), Ford Madox Brown: The Unofficial Pre-Raphaelite, Birmingham Museum and Art Gallery, 2008, ISBN 978-1-904832-56-0.
- Angela Thirlwell, Into the Frame: The Four Loves of Ford Madox Brown, Chatto & Windus, 2010, ISBN 978-0-7011-7902-1.
- Julian Treuherz, Ford Madox Brown: Pre-Raphaelite Pioneer, Philip Wilson Publishers, 2011, ISBN 978-0-856677-00-7, p. 12.
