= David Soskice =

British political economist and academic

David William Soskice
- Born: 6 July 1942 (age 84)
- Occupations: Political economist; academic
- Title: LSE School Professor of Political Science and Economics
- Spouse(s): Alison Black (m. 1966, divorced) Nicola Lacey (m. 1991)
- Children: 2
- Father: Frank Soskice

Academic background
- Education: Winchester College; Nuffield College, Oxford; Trinity College, Oxford

David William Soskice, FBA (born 6 July 1942) is a British political economist and academic. He is currently the LSE School Professor of Political Science and Economics at the London School of Economics.

== Early life and education ==
Soskice was born as son of the British Labour Home Secretary Frank Soskice and his wife Susan Isabella Cloudsley Soskice (née Hunter) in London. He shares his first name with his grandfather, the Russian revolutionary journalist David Soskice, who had fled to England. His paternal grandmother was Juliet Catherine Emma Soskice (née Hueffer), daughter of Francis Hueffer and Catherine Madox Brown, sister of Ford Madox Ford and Oliver Madox Hueffer, granddaughter of Ford Madox Brown, half-niece of Lucy Madox Brown and cousin of Olivia Rossetti Agresti.

Soskice was educated at Winchester College and studied Political science, Philosophy and Economics at Nuffield and at Trinity College, Oxford.

== Academic career ==
Between 1967 and 1990, he worked as Lecturer in Economics at University College, Oxford. After the Fall of the Berlin Wall he went to the Berlin Social Science Research Center, where he worked as Research professor and director of the working group 'Employment and Economic change'. After his retirement in 2007, he returned to Nuffield as Research Professor of Comparative Political Economy and Senior Research Fellow.

Soskice was Visiting Professor at Harvard, Yale, Stanford, Berkeley, Cornell and, every spring semester, at Duke University. Between 2004 and 2007, he was appointed Centennial Professor at the London School of Economics. He counselled the OECD, the British Labour Party and the governments of United Kingdom, France, and Germany in questions of employment and education.

=== Research ===
Within his research area, political economy, Soskice's focusses on the study of labor markets, systems of Vocational education and production regimes.

The 2001 published book Varieties of Capitalism, written/edited by Soskice and the Harvard professor Peter A. Hall is influential both in Political Economy (due to its macroeconomic implications) and Business (because of its analytical focus on the organizational structure of the individual firm). The book typecasts and analyzes two distinct types of capitalist economies: the liberal and coordinated market economies.

== Personal life ==
In 1966, Soskice married Alison Black; they later divorced. Together they had two children: one son and one daughter. In 1991, he married the legal scholar Nicola Lacey.

== Bibliography ==
- 2006: Macroeconomics: Imperfections, Institutions and Policies (with Wendy Carlin)
- 2001: Varieties of Capitalism: The Institutional Foundations of Comparative Advantage (ed. with Peter A. Hall).
- 2000: Unions, Employers and Central Banks: Wage Bargaining and Macroeconomic Regimes in an Integrating Europe (ed. with Torben Iversen, and Jonas Pontusson).
- 1995: Institutional Frameworks and Labour Market Performance (ed. with Friedrich Buttler, Wolfgang Franz, and Ronald Schettkat).
- 1990: Macroeconomics and the Wage Bargain: A Modern Approach to Employment, Inflation and Exchange Rates (with Wendy Carlin).
- 1983: Unionism, Economic Stabilisation and Incomes Policies: European Experience, (ed. with Robert Flanagan and Lloyd Ulman).
