= Leopold Kaufmann =

German politician

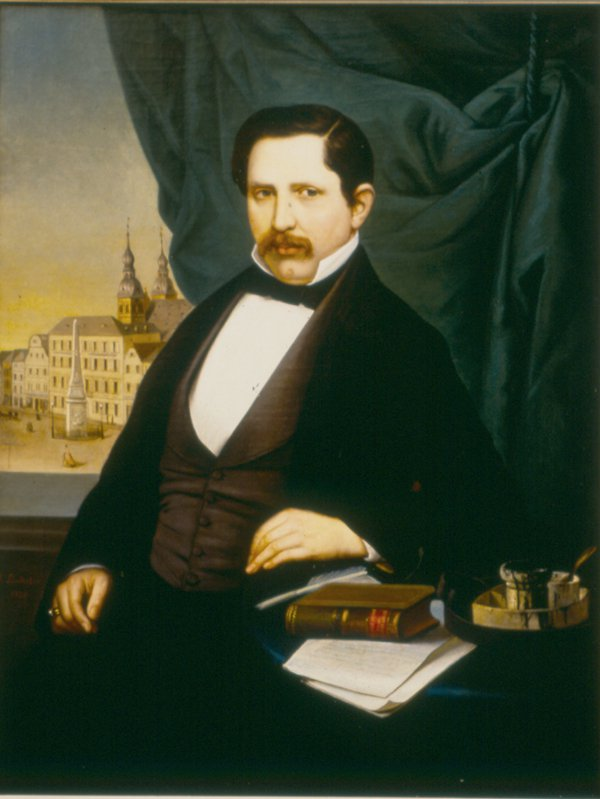
Leopold Ernst Kaufmann

Leopold Ernst Kaufmann (13 March 1821 – 27 February 1898) was a German politician. Brother of the poet and folklorist Alexander Kaufmann, he became Chief Burgomaster of Bonn.

== Life ==
=== 1840s-1850s ===
With his brother Alexander, he attended the grammar school of his native city, and in the autumn of 1840, through Ernst Moritz Arndt, who had shortly before been reinstated in his professorship, Kaufmann matriculated as student of law at the University of Bonn. His sister Maria Theresia Julia (Julia) Kaufmann was the mother of Francis Hueffer, German-English music critic and librettist and thus the grandmother of Ford Madox Ford, Oliver Madox Hueffer and Juliet Catherine Emma Hueffer (wife of David Soskice and mother of Frank Soskice).

His friends included Felix Mendelssohn, and Franz Liszt, and the poet Gottfried Kinkel. They with his future wife Johanna, née Mockel, founded a poetical society called the "Maikäferbund". On the occasion of the first Beethoven festival and of the unveiling of the Beethoven Monument, in the summer of 1845, Kaufmann founded the male choral society of Bonn, the "Concordia".

When the revolutionary disturbances broke out in May 1848, and many of the burgomasters in the Rhenish provinces voluntarily gave up their positions, he was appointed first government referendary of the burgomaster administrator at Unkel on the Rhine, and one year later deputy landrath or president of the District of Zell on the Moselle. In October 1850, he was elected Burgomaster of Bonn, which at that time contained 18,000 inhabitants, and assumed office in the following May. In 1859, he received the title of chief burgomaster.

=== 1860s-1870s ===
Among the enterprises which he planned for the welfare of the city may be mentioned the foundations for docks on the Rhine, the drainage of the entire city, laying out new plans for alignment and rebuilding, and eventually for a canal. He laid out the city in districts; he also built an asylum for the insane. He provided for the young by a systematic reorganization of the public schools, and for the support of the orphans. He worked for the artistic adornment of the cemetery of Bonn, of the tombs of Schiller's widow and his son Ernst, those of the composer Robert Schumann, and the poet August Wilhelm Schlegel.

In 1861, Kaufmann was appointed by the King of Prussia a life member of the Upper House on the nomination of the city of Bonn. On the question of reforming the army, he voted with the so-called constitutional deputies on 11 October 1862, for the budget as arranged by the Lower House. On the Beethoven centenary in 1870, the Beethovenhalle was built. In August 1871, the Beethoven music festival was held, and in August 1873, the Schumann festival, two significant musical events, the success of which was largely due to Kaufmann, and which procured for Bonn the renown of a first-class artistic centre.

After the Vatican decree of 18 July 1870, Bonn and Munich became the centres of the Old Catholic movement. Whilst several of Kaufmann's friends joined the new sect, he remained true to the Catholic Church. In 1874, he was unanimously re-elected burgomaster for the third time by the town council of Bonn, for a term of twelve years, but he became a victim of the Kulturkampf. Although he recognized the necessity for the government taking measures with the object of regulating its attitude towards the Catholic Church, and declared himself prepared in his official capacity to carry out the May Laws, his confirmation was refused by the administration on 8 May 1875, a measure which resulted in an interpellation by Windt-Lorst in the Reichstag and the Prussian Diet. At the end of 1876, Kaufmann was elected to the Lower House from the electoral district of München-Gladbach, joined the Centre party, and soon became a member of its governing committee. In the Reichstag he frequently spoke in the interest of art and science. He was likewise one of the founders of the "Görresgesellschaft", for fostering science in Catholic Germany (1876), and for the first fifteen years was its general secretary.

=== 1880s ===
After 1882, he was vice-president of the Borromeo Society for disseminating good books. In 1886, he refused re-election to the Reichstag, and henceforth devoted himself to the promotion of art and of useful undertakings, particularly to the decoration of Bonn Cathedral.

== Works ==
Among his writings were:

- "Albrecht Dürer" (Cologne, 1881; 2nd ed., 1887);
- "Bilder aus dem Rheinland" (1884);
- "Philipp Veit, Vorträge über Kunst" (1891).
