= Soskice =

Soskice is a surname. Notable people with the surname include:

- David Soskice (born 1942), British political economist and academic
- Frank Soskice (1902–1979), British lawyer and politician
- Janet Soskice (born 1951), British theologian and philosopher
- Juliet Catherine Emma Hueffer, married name Juliet Soskice (1881–1944), British translator and writer
