= Hueffer =

Hueffer is an English surname. Notable people with the surname include:

- Ford Hermann Hueffer (1873–1939), English novelist, poet, critic, and editor
- Francis Hueffer (1845–1889), German-English writer
- Oliver Madox Hueffer (1877–1931), English author and playwright
