= List of compositions by Julius Harrison =

This is a partial list of compositions by Julius Harrison (1885–1963).

== Operetta ==
- A Fantasy of Flowers (1944); libretto by Muriel Levy

== Orchestral ==
- Ballade for string orchestra (1902)
- Prelude Music for string orchestra and piano (or harp), Op.16 (1912); original for harp and string quartet
- Variations on "Down Among the Dead Men" (1912)
- Widdicombe Fair, Humoreske for string orchestra, Op.22 (1916); original for string quartet
- Rapunzel (1917); tone poem
- Worcestershire Suite (1918); original for piano
- Romance, a Song of Adoration (1930); for orchestra
- Cornish Holiday Sketches for string orchestra (1935)
- Autumn Landscape for string orchestra (1937); premiered by the BBC Symphony Orchestra in February 1937
- Troubadour Suite for string orchestra, harp (or piano) and optional horns (1944)

1. The King of Navarre's Chanson
2. The Marriage of Yolande
3. Song of Spring
4. Dancing Song

== Concertante ==
- Bredon Hill, Rhapsody for violin and orchestra (1941)

== Chamber music ==
- Prelude Music, Quintet in G♭ major for harp and string quartet, Op.16 (1912); also for string orchestra and piano (or harp)
- Scaramouche for violin and piano (1915)
- Pensée fugitive for violin and piano (1915)
- Widdicombe Fair, Humoreske for string quartet, Op.22 (1916); also for string orchestra
- Fanfare for a Masked Ball for 4 trumpets (1921)
- Sonata in C minor for viola and piano (1945)
- String Quartet

== Organ ==
- Paean and Tonus Peregrinus: Homage to Cesar Franck
- Paean (1913)
- Supplication / Gloria in Excelsis / Canzone (1913)

== Piano ==
- Rhapsody, Intermezzo and Capriccio (1903)
- Musette for voice and piano (1907)
- Barcarolle (1917)
- Worcestershire Suite (1918); also orchestrated

1. The Shrawley Round
2. Redstone Rock
3. Pershore Plums
4. The Ledbury Parson

- The Pixie Man, Suite (1920)
- Silver Bells and Cockle Shells (1920)
- Five English Songs (1921)
- Severn Country, Suite (1928)

1. Dance in the Cherry Orchard (Ribbesford)
2. Twilight on the River (Bewdley)
3. Far Forest

- Philomel (1938)
- Town and Country (1948)
- Wayside Fancies, Suite (1948)

1. March Humoresque
2. An Old Legend
3. Columbine's Waltz
4. Summer Breeze
5. The Jolly Huntsman

- Autumn Days (1952)
- Burlesque (1952)
- Caprice (1952)
- High Summer (1952)
- Mr. Alberti Takes a Stroll (1952)
- Outdoor Song: At the fair (1952)
- Spring in the Air (1952)
- The Rival Fourth Finger (1952)
- Valse-Serenade (1952)

== Vocal ==
- Six Short Songs for medium voice and piano (1907)
- Bonny Blue-cap for medium voice and piano (1908); words by Sir Walter Scott
- Rosalys for soprano voices and orchestra (1912); words by Dante Gabriel Rossetti
- Songs of Fancy, 4 Songs (1913); words by P. Ashbrooke

1. Little Untrodden Paths
2. Oh, Little Mist from the Sea
3. Silent Trees
4. At Daybreak

- Four Songs of Chivalry for voice and piano (1915); words by William Morris

1. Sir Giles' War Song
2. Guendolen
3. The Eve of Crecy
4. The Gilliflower of Gold

- Three Eastern Love Songs for voice and piano (1915); words by Edward Teschemacher

1. You Bring Me Pearls
2. O Jewel of the Deep Blue Sea
3. Caravan of Love

- The Wanderer's Song (1915); words by George Reston Malloch
- Four Narratives from the Ancient Chinese for medium voice and piano (1917)

1. The Soldier
2. The Last Revel
3. There Was a King of Liang
4. The Recruiting Sergeant

- Three Sonnets from Boccaccio for high voice and piano (1919); words by Giovanni Boccaccio
- On the Beach at Otahai (1920); words by E. J. Brady
- Three Songs (1921–1927)

1. Merciless Beauty; words by Geoffrey Chaucer
2. The Escape from Love; words by Geoffrey Chaucer
3. A Lament; words by Sir Thomas Wyatt

- I Know a Bank for soprano or tenor and piano (1928); words from A Midsummer Night's Dream by William Shakespeare
- Four Cavalier Tunes for tenor or baritone and piano (1930); words by Robert Browning

Boot, Saddle, To Horse and Away
King Charles
Marching Along

- Rhapsody for tenor or baritone voice and orchestra (1932); words by Walt Whitman
- Sea Winds for voice and piano (1932); words by Paul Askew
- Memory Island for baritone and piano (1936); words by Paul Askew
- Philomel for voice and piano (1938); words from A Midsummer Night's Dream by William Shakespeare
- Four Songs from Twelfth Night for high voice and piano (1948); words from Twelfth Night by William Shakespeare

1. Come Away Death
2. Jolly Robin
3. O Mistress Mine
4. Clown's Song

== Choral ==
- Cleopatra, Dramatic Poem (Cantata) for soli (soprano, mezzo-soprano, contralto, tenor), chorus and orchestra (1908); performed at the Norwich Festival in 1908
- Harvest Cantata for soprano (or tenor) and contralto (or baritone) soli, chorus and piano or organ (1910); words by Rose Dafforne Betjemann
- Christmas Cantata for soli and chorus (1911); words by Rose Dafforne Betjemann
- Viking Song, Part-song for male chorus and pianoforte or orchestra (1911); words by Fred Adlington
- Open Thy Gates, Introit Anthem for mixed chorus (with organ ad libitum) (1913); words by Robert Herrick
- Prevent Us, O Lord, Anthem for mixed chorus and organ (1914)
- Blows the Wind To-day for mixed chorus a cappella (1915); words by Robert Louis Stevenson
- In the Forest for mixed chorus a cappella (1913); words by Heinrich Heine; translation by Francis Hueffer
- Requiem for Archangels for SATB choir or chorus (1919)
- In Celia's Face for chorus (composed prior to 1921); poem by Thomas Carew
- Easter Carol for female chorus and piano (1921); words by Frederick Elliott
- The Little Men for female chorus (1921); words by William Allingham
- Pastoral for chorus (composed by 1922)
- The Blessed Damozel for female chorus a cappella (1928); words by Dante Gabriel Rossetti
- I Love the Jocund Dance for a capella SSA chorus (1929); poem by William Blake
- A Sunny Shaft, Part Song for female chorus and piano (1929); words by Samuel Taylor Coleridge
- Merry Miller, Folk-jingle for mixed chorus a cappella (1932); words by Helen Taylor
- Song of the Plough for mixed-voice chorus (1932); words from the first Georgic of Virgil, tr. James Rhoades
- Magnificat and Nunc dimittis for unison voices and organ (1941)
- The Wild Huntsman, Fantasia for male chorus a cappella (1946)
- The Dark Forest, Part-song for mixed chorus a cappella (1947); words by Edward Thomas
- Mass in C for solo voices, chorus, organ and orchestra (1936–1947); premiered at Stoke-on-Trent in 1948; twice broadcast in 1952 and 1955
- Missa liturgica for mixed chorus a cappella (1950)
- Psalm C (Psalm 100) for mixed chorus and organ (1953)
- Requiem Mass for soprano, alto, tenor and bass soli, mixed chorus and orchestra (1948–1957); first performed in 1957 at the Worcester Three Choirs Festival

== Unfinished opera ==
- The Canterbury Pilgrims. The opera's Introduction and Love Duet were premiered in 1923, but the opera was never completed.

== Arrangements ==
Harrison's many arrangements include versions of Weber's Invitation to the Dance, sundry Schubert songs (entitled Winter and Spring) and a "concert version" of Smetana's The Bartered Bride all for mixed chorus.
