= 1950 Sheffield Neepsend by-election =

UK parliamentary by-election

← 1950	5 April 1950	1951 →

Sheffield Neepsend constituency
- Turnout: 55.1% (▲9.3 pp)
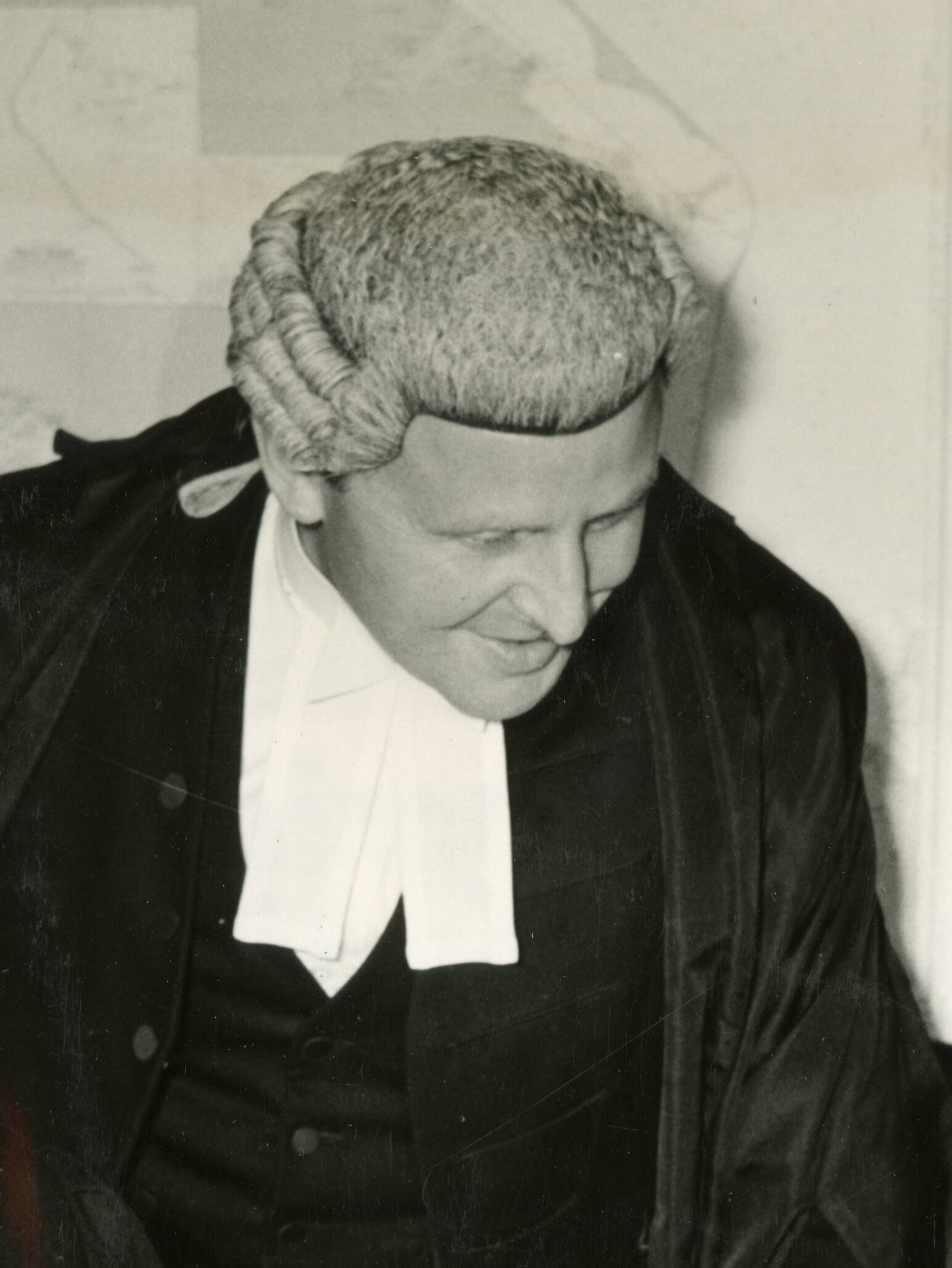
	First party	Second party
		Con
Candidate	Frank Soskice	John Philip Hunt
Party	Labour	Conservative
Popular vote	22,080	8,365
Percentage	70.8%	26.8%
Swing	▼2.0 pp	▼0.4 pp

The 1950 Sheffield Neepsend by-election was a parliamentary by-election held on 5 April 1950 for the British House of Commons constituency of Sheffield Neepsend in Neepsend, an industrial suburb of the city of Sheffield.

The seat had become vacant when the constituency's Labour Member of Parliament (MP), Harry Morris, was elevated to the peerage as the first Baron Morris of Kenwood. Morris, who had held the seat since its creation for the 1950 general election, had been offered a peerage to trigger a by-election in a safe seat which could be easily won by Frank Soskice.

Soskice had been Solicitor General since Clement Attlee's Labour Government had taken office in 1945. His Birkenhead East constituency had been abolished in boundary changes for the 1950 general election, and he had not been selected for another seat.

Soskice won the by-election comfortably, with over 70% of the votes. He represented Sheffield Neepsend until the constituency was abolished for the 1955 general election, when he again found himself without a seat. He returned to Parliament the following year at the by-election on 6 July 1956 for the Newport constituency in Monmouthshire.

== Result ==
By-election 1950: Sheffield Neepsend
Party	Candidate	Votes	%	±%
Labour	Frank Soskice	22,080	70.8	−2.0
Conservative	John Philip Hunt	8,365	26.8	−0.4
Communist	Bill Moore	729	2.4	New
Majority		13,715	44.0	−1.6
Turnout		31,174	55.1	−28.7
Labour hold		Swing	−0.8	

== See also ==
- Sheffield Neepsend (UK Parliament constituency)
- Sheffield
- Lists of United Kingdom by-elections
