= Baron Morris of Kenwood =

Barony in the Peerage of the United Kingdom

Baron Morris of Kenwood, of Kenwood in the City of Sheffield, is a title in the Peerage of the United Kingdom. It was created in 1950 for the Labour politician Harry Morris. He had previously represented Sheffield Central and Sheffield Neepsend in the House of Commons. As of 2017 the title is held by his grandson, the third Baron, who succeeded his father in 2004.

== Barons Morris of Kenwood (1950) ==
- Harry Morris, 1st Baron Morris of Kenwood (1893–1954)
- Philip Geoffrey Morris, 2nd Baron Morris of Kenwood (1928–2004)
- Jonathan David Morris, 3rd Baron Morris of Kenwood (b. 1968)

The heir apparent is the present holder's son the Hon. Benjamin Julian Morris (b. 1998)
