= Helen Rossetti Angeli =

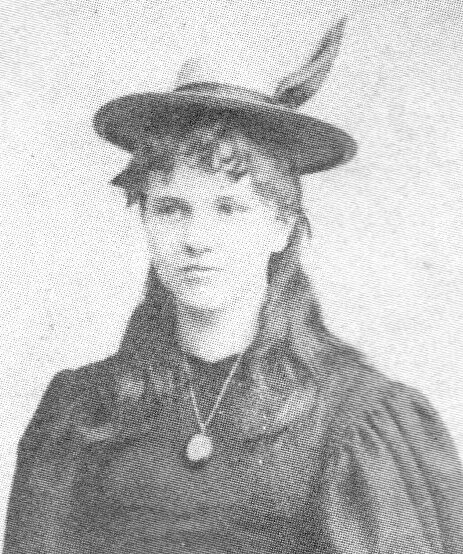
- Born: Helen Maria Madox Rossetti; November 10, 1879
- Died: September 11, 1969 (aged 89)
- Occupations: Writer, translator, biographer
- Parents: William Michael Rossetti (father); Lucy Madox Brown (mother)
- Family: Christina Rossetti (aunt); Dante Gabriel Rossetti (uncle); Olivia Rossetti Agresti (sister)

Helen Maria Madox Rossetti Angeli (10 November 1879 – 11 September 1969) was a British-born Italian writer, translator, and biographer.

== Personal life ==
Helen Maria Madox Rossetti was born in 1879, the second daughter of William Michael Rossetti and Lucy Madox Brown. She was said to be the "most artistic" of the couple's children, with her father recalling that from "her earliest years she showed a certain unmistakable aptitude for sketching and painting".

She married the Italian Gastone Angeli in Naples on 10 December 1903, afterwards travelling with him to Cairo, where he was employed in the Italian Chamber of Commerce. Already in ill health when they married, Gastone Angeli died on 18 July 1904. Their daughter, Imogene Lucy, was born in Rome on 15 September. Soon after, Helen and the baby returned to London to live with William Michael Rossetti.

Helen Rossetti Angeli died in Oxford on 11 September 1969, aged 89.

== Writing ==
The Rossetti children were drawn to anarchism while in their early teens, and in 1891 with her sister, Olivia Rossetti Agresti, Helen founded and edited anarchist journal The Torch (1891–1896). Historian Pietro di Paola has described the journal as "both an archetypal anarchist publication in formal terms, and a high-quality publication ranking among the most original and stimulating of the prolific anarchist movement in its golden age". In 1903, the sisters wrote and published A Girl Among the Anarchists in 1903, using the name Isabel Meredith. This was, wrote their father, "with fancy-names and some modification of details, a genuine account of their experiences".

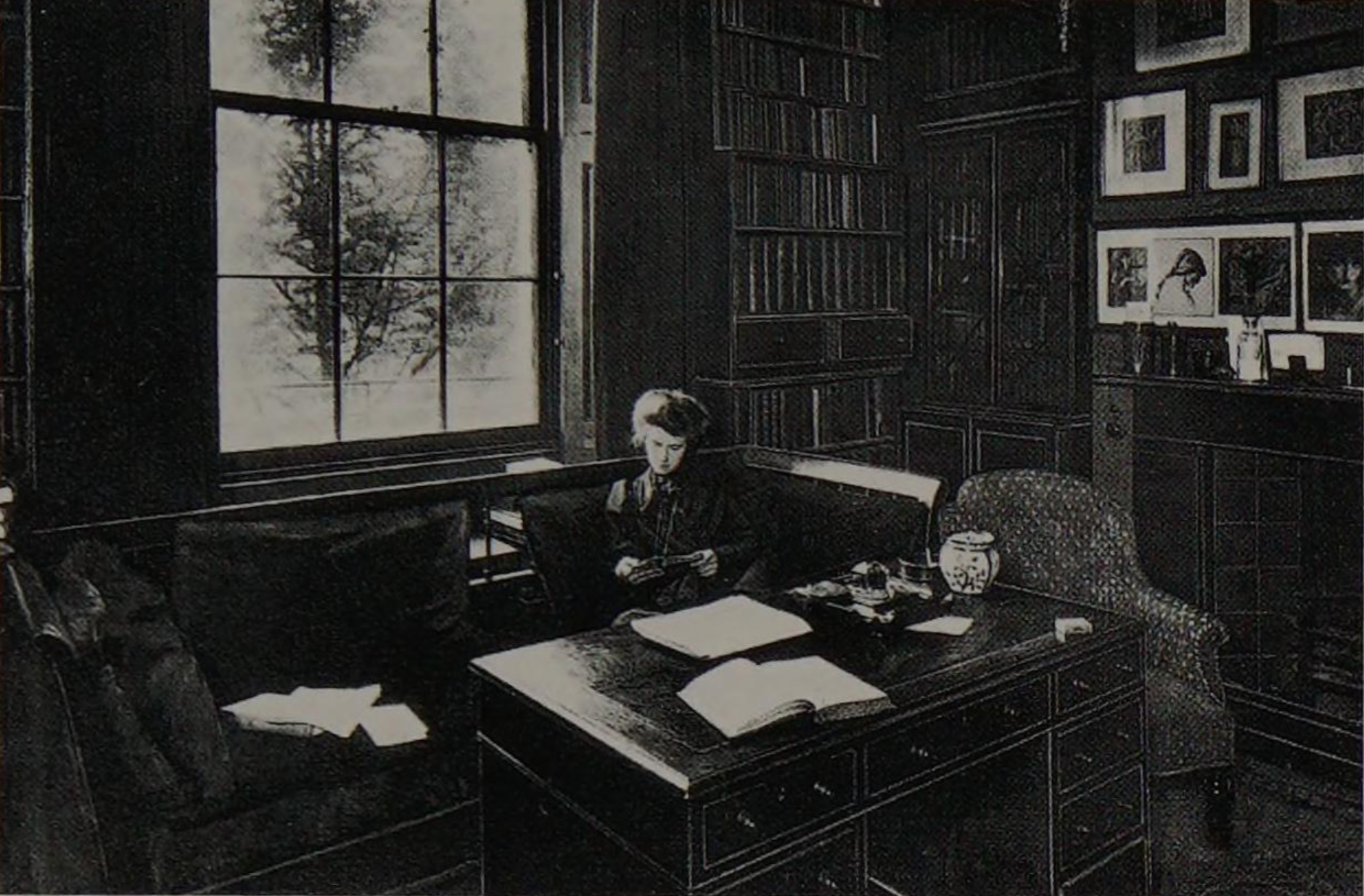
Helen Rossetti Angeli in the library of William Michael Rossetti

In 1902, Helen Rossetti published a monograph on Dante Gabriel Rosseti, which formed the Easter Annual of The Art Journal.

In 1949, Angeli published Dante Gabriel Rossetti: His Friends and Enemies, described by The Sphere as a "full-blooded, whole-hearted defence of a poet and painter who has been much discussed and, it would seem, much maligned since his death". Vernon Fane wrote that her intimate knowledge and "animated spirit" made the biography "something beyond the cut-and-dried "life" that it might have been from another pen."

In 1954, Angeli wrote Pre-Raphaelite Twilight, a biography of Charles Augustus Howell, based on letters and manuscripts she had preserved.

== Bibliography ==
- Ford Madox Brown (De La More Press, 1902)
- The Life and Work of Daniel Gabriel Rossetti (The Art Journal, 1902)
- A Girl Among the Anarchists, with Olivia Rossetti (Duckworth & Co., 1903)
- The Age of Shakespeare (Chatto & Windus, 1908)
- Shelley and his Friends in Italy (Methuen & Co. Ltd., 1911)
- Dante Gabriel Rossetti: His Friends and Enemies (Hamish Hamilton, 1949)
- Pre-Raphaelite Twilight (Richards Press, 1954)
