= Harry Morris, 1st Baron Morris of Kenwood =

British politician

The Right Honourable The Lord Morris of Kenwood

Member of Parliament for
- In office 26 July 1945 – 20 March 1950
- Preceded by: William Boulton
- Succeeded by: Frank Soskice

Personal details
- Born: 7 October 1893
- Died: 1 July 1954 (aged 60)
- Party: Labour

Harry Morris, 1st Baron Morris of Kenwood (7 October 1893 – 1 July 1954) was a British Labour Party politician.

== Member of Parliament ==
He was elected at the 1945 general election as Member of Parliament (MP) for Sheffield Central, defeating the Conservative incumbent William Boulton. His constituency was abolished for the 1950 general election, when he was returned for the new Sheffield Neepsend constituency.

== Resignation and Peerage ==
However, he resigned his seat four weeks later, on 20 March, (by taking the Stewardship of the Manor of Northstead) to make way for the former Solicitor General Frank Soskice, whose Birkenhead East constituency had been abolished. Morris was then elevated to the peerage as Baron Morris of Kenwood in the 1950 Birthday Honours.

He died in July 1954 aged 60.

Parliament of the United Kingdom
| Preceded by William Boulton | Member of Parliament for Sheffield Central; 1945–1950 | Constituency abolished |
| New constituency | Member of Parliament for Sheffield Neepsend; February 1950–March 1950 | Succeeded by Sir Frank Soskice |
Peerage of the United Kingdom
| New creation | Baron Morris of Kenwood; 1950–1954 | Succeeded by Philip Morris |
