= Who Can Be Happy and Free in Russia? =

Unfinished long poem by Nikolay Nekrasov

Who Lives Happily in Russia
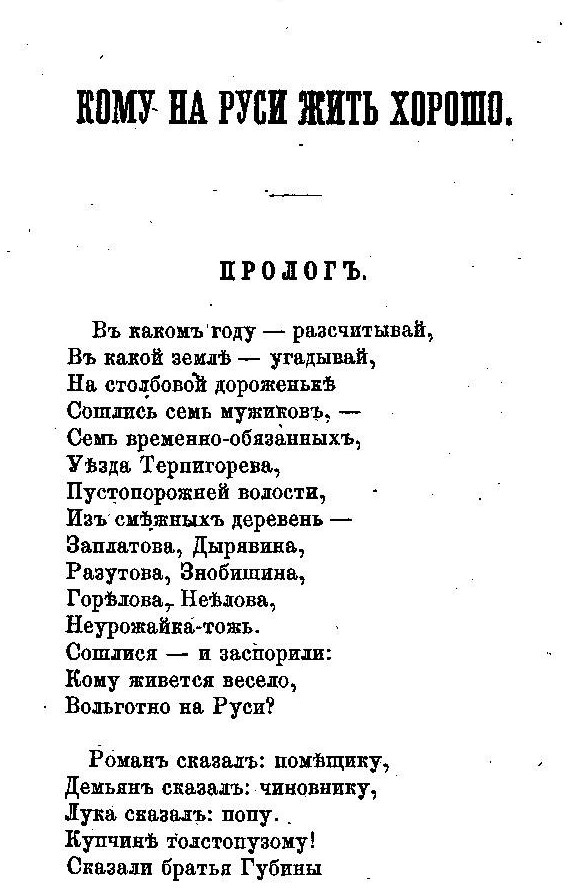
- First page of the first edition
- Author: Nikolai Nekrasov
- Original title: Кому на Руси жить хорошо
- Language: Russian
- Genre: Poem
- Publisher: Sovremennik, Otechestvennye zapiski
- Publication date: 1866-1877 (unfinished)
- Publication place: Russia

Who Lives Happily in Russia? (Russian: Кому на Руси жить хорошо, romanized: Komú na Rusí zhit' horoshó) is an epic four-part poem by Nikolai Nekrasov, which he started publishing in January 1866 in Sovremennik and Otechestvennye Zapiski. Its fourth part, "The Feast for All the World" (1876–1877), remained unfinished.

The only full English translation was made in 1917, under the title Who Can Be Happy and Free in Russia?, by Juliet Soskice. The other suggested titles are Who Lives Happily in Russia?, Who Is Happy in Russia? and Who Can Be Happy in Russia?

== Synopsis ==
Seven peasants embark upon a journey across the Russian land united by an idea of finding just one happy person. They made several guesses as to who can live happily in Russia: pomeshchik (landed gentry), chinovnik (government official), priest, merchant, minister, tsar.

Witnessing nothing but suffering and injustice all around, they are surprised to find that even those supposed to be the masters of the land find life here totally unsatisfactory.

The peasants decide not to return home until they find the right answer. In the prologue, they also find a self-assembled tablecloth that will feed them, and hit the road.

=== Chapter I. Priest ===
The peasants continued on their way. They met many people, but no one was interested in life. All the wanderers were close to them: the bast shoe, the artisan, the beggar, the coachman. The soldier could not be happy. He shaves with an awl, warms himself with smoke. Toward nightfall, they met a priest. The peasants stood in a row and bowed to the holy man. Luka began to ask the priest if he was free to live. The priest thought about it and began to talk. He simply kept silent about the years of study. The priest has no rest. He is called to a sick, dying person. My heart aches and aches for orphans and people leaving for another world. The hand does not rise to take copper dimes - a reward for demand. And you have to live on something. The priest has no honor. They call him insulting words, stay away on the way, compose fairy tales. They do not like either a priest's daughter, or a priest, or seminarians. A priest is not held in high esteem among all classes. Where does the priest get wealth? There used to be many nobles in Russia. Children were born in the estates, weddings were played. Even if one of the landowners lived in cities, then he came to die in the village and bequeathed to be buried in the parish. Everyone went to the priests, the wealth grew and multiplied, and the laity also received something. Now everything has changed in Russia. The landowners scattered across the foreign land, leaving only ruined possessions in their homeland. The priest complains about the emerging schismatics who live among the Orthodox. However, he was lucky here, he avoided the need to cash in on schismatics, since in his parish there are Orthodox Christians in the majority - two-thirds. But the life of the priests is becoming more and more difficult, only poor peasants give income. And what can they give? Only a dime and a pie for the holiday, and eggs for Easter. The priest finished his melancholy story and moved on. The men pounced on Luka, who argued that the priests live at ease.

== History ==
Nekrasov started working upon the poem soon after the Tzarist manifest abolishing serfdom was published in March 1861. The rough version of the Prologue as well as Part 1 have been ready by 1863; the latter's first chapter were published in Otechestvennye Zapiski's January 1869 issue. The whole of the Part 1 appeared in the 1873 (5th) edition of the Works by N.Nekrasov. Chapter 2, "The Last One" (Последыш, Posledysh) was written in the late 1872 and appeared in print in the OZ February 1873 issue. Part 3, "The Peasant Woman" (Крестьянка, Krestyanka), was published in OZ No.1, 1874. In all the posthumous editions "Krestyanka" featured as part 2 and "Posledysh" followed it. In 1876-1877 Nekrasov was working hectically upon Part 4, "The Feast for All the World" (Пир на весь мир), but death from cancer on 28 December 1877 (old style) prevented him from finishing it.

=== Problems with censorship ===
All four parts of the poem had their problems with censorship. Part 4, which was supposed to appear in Otechestvennye Zapisky's November 1876 issue, was banned altogether. A.Petrov, the head of the Saint Petersburg censorship committee informed the magazine that it will be closed immediately should it proceed with the proposed publication. For the now terminally ill author this proved to be a heavy blow.

According to sister Anna Alekseyevna Nekrasova, on November 19 the poet "sent for censor Petrov and for two hours was trying to put it to him that there was nothing reprehensible in the Part 4. He even suggested certain lines in the earlier parts of the poem might have deserved the ban better... Petrov puffed, swiping sweat from his face, occasionally moaning: 'Please calm down, Nikolai Alekseyevich... Once you get better, you'll correct some things and it will pass through...'" In the last desperate attempt to appease the censors, Nekrasov removed several fragments (including three songs) from Part 4 and added two lines glorifying Tsar Alexander II (Glory to the one / Who's given freedom to the people, - Slavsya, narodu / davshy svobodu).

Encouraged by Dostoyevsky who (mistakenly) informed him that Professor N.N.Grigoryev, the chief of the governmental Press and Publishing department, expressed his willingness to lift the ban from the publication of the poem's final part, Nekrasov asked the latter for help in a personal letter: "I made some concessions according to the censor [Lebedev]'s demands and removed Soldier's Song along with two more songs, but to throw away Yakov's Story, - and he considers this necessary so as to avoid the arrest of both the book and the journal, - is something I cannot do, for that would render the whole thing meaningless. The ugliness of serfdom at its most extreme is shown here so as to highlight the great moral value of its abolition. How can one maul the poem on the grounds that it features gloomy songs and scenes from the times of serfdom? There is hope in it too. The final verdict depends on your Excellency. As for me, now I regret I had to cut those fragments, I did that against my own convictions." Apparently, Grigoryev was not impressed by Nekrasov's argument, for the final part of the poem remained banned.

In January 1881, three years after Nekrasov's death, as the political tension subsided, Saltykov-Shchedrin again presented the final chapter for the censor's consideration. N.S. Abaza, who succeeded Grigoryev as the Press and Publishing department's chief, found nothing wrong with it and the same censor Lebedev signed the permission. In the February 1881 issue of Otechestvennye Zapiski, "The Feast For All the World" was published for the first time, albeit with all the cuts that Nekrasov had made himself.

Having noticed in the proofs the verse glorifying the Tsar, Anna Nekrasova reminded Saltykov that it had been written under pressure and asked for it to be removed. Saltykov answered it was too late to change, besides, it was this version that had been approved by Abaza. For some reason Anna Nekrasova decided against removing the offending fragments from the text when she herself was supervising it for the 1881 edition of The Works of N.A.Nekrasov. This was done decades later, starting with the 1927 Soviet edition of it.

== Elements of folklore ==
One the distinguishing features of the poem is its closeness to Russian poetic folklore. Working upon it, Nekrasov used numerous academic sources and ethnographical collections. He contributed to it some of his own findings too. According to Gleb Uspensky, Nekrasov for twenty years was "word by word" gathering bits and pieces he later used in the poem. "Nekrasov worked with the Russian folklore not as a copyist but as a real artist... He managed to work the rich and complex multitude of the Russian proverbs and sayings into the vast tapestry guided by ideological lines with great taste," argued Korney Chukovsky.

In each of the poem's four parts elements of Russian folklore were used differently. "The Last One" (Posledysh), a family drama in the form of a poetic novelette, is devoid of it altogether. "The Feast For All the World" features song-like fragments only occasionally. On the whole its written in a middle class intelligentsia manner, some of its songs ("In the moment of gloom, Oh Motherland...") sounding like no songs at all. On the other hand, "The Peasant Woman" (Krestyanka) is built upon the huge bulk of a folklore material. Some of the folk songs have undergone artistic treatment, others ("You tell me, why...", "My hated husband rises...") are used here in their authentic forms, documenting Russian peasants's ways of life.

"Krestyanka"'s Chapter 1 features some wedding zaplachki ("mourning-rants") and pritchety (lamentations) collected by Pavel Rybnikov in the Olonets region. Several songs here are taken from the "Songs Collected by P.N.Rybnikov, Vol. I-IV, 1861-1867". Chapter 2 of "Krestyanka" (The Songs) is based upon the books of collected folklore by Vladimir Dal ("The Proverbs of the Russian People, 1862"), Rybnikov, Pavel Sheyn ("Russian Folk Songs", 1870), Viktor Varentsov ("The Collection of Songs from the Samara Region", 1862) and several others.

In 1872 folklorist Elpidifor Barsov released his acclaimed "Northern Krai Lamentations", reviewed in Otechestvennye Zapiski by Nikolai Mikhaylovsky. Several of the verses from it (tellingly, all quoted by the reviewer) were used by Nekrasov in Chapter IV of the Part 3. All belonged to Irina Fedosova, the famous Olonets voplenitsa (lament-cryer). In the tale of Matryona Korchagina, one of this chapter's character, Nekrasov used details of Fedosova's autobiography, related by Barsov in his 1972 book.

== Legacy ==
Nekrasov's magnum opus is regarded as a groundbreaking work, a "great poem, featuring the whole of the Russian people as its main hero," according to Korney Chukovsky. "With its extraordinary verbal expressiveness, energy and many discoveries, this is one of the most original Russian poems of the 19th century," wrote literary historian D.S.Mirsky.
