= Vera Kryzhanovskaia =

Russian novelist

Vera Ivanovna Kryzhanovskaia
- Вера Ивановна Крыжановская
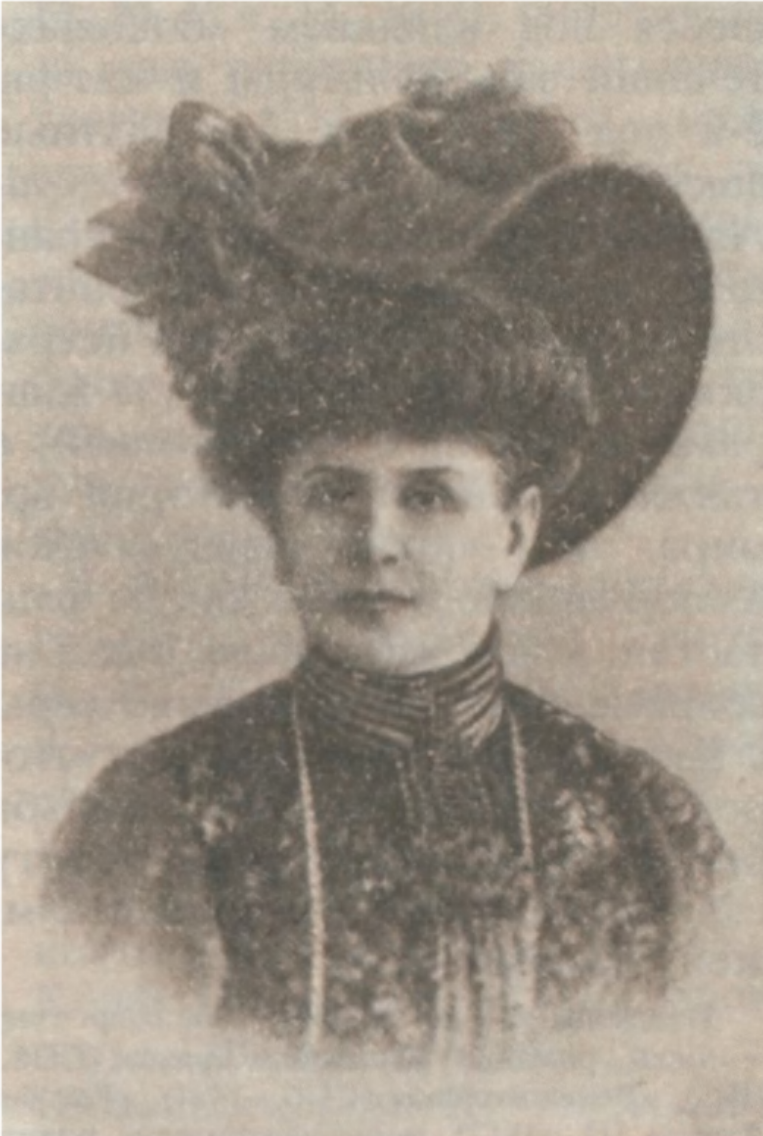
- Born: June 14, 1857; Warsaw, Poland
- Died: December 29, 1924 (aged 67); Estonia
- Other name: Vera Ivanovna Semenöva
- Occupation: Novelist
- Years active: 1872–1924

Vera Ivanovna Kryzhanovskaia (married name Semenöva; June 14, 1857 – December 29, 1924) was a Russian novelist and self-proclaimed psychography practitioner. Between 1885 and 1917 she wrote nearly one hundred novels and short stories signed by the spirit of English poet John Wilmot, 2nd Earl of Rochester, by whom she claimed her novels were dictated to her. She wrote in French and then translated her works into Russian.

== Biography ==
Vera Ivanovna Kryzhanovskaia descended from a noble family from the province of Tambov. She was born on June 14, 1857 in Warsaw, Poland, where her father, Major General Ivan Antonovich Kryzhanovsky, commanded an artillery brigade. Her mother came from a family of pharmacists. From an early age, Vera received a fine education and had an interest in ancient history and occultism.

Her father died when Vera was ten years old, leaving the family in a difficult financial situation. In 1872, Vera enrolled on a scholarship to St. Catherine School, a charitable educational association for noble young women in Saint Petersburg. However, her fragile health and financial difficulties prevented her from completing the course. In 1877, she was dismissed and completed her education at home.

During this period, Vera claimed that the spirit of the English poet John Wilmot, 2nd Earl of Rochester (1647-1680), taking advantage of her mediumship abilities, materialized and proposed that she dedicate herself, body and soul, to the service of God and that she write under his direction. After this contact with whom she considered her spiritual guide, Vera claimed that she was cured of chronic tuberculosis, a serious disease at the time, without medical intervention.

At the age of 18, she began her work in psychography. In 1880, gathered at her spiritualist sessions during a trip to France, she participated in a mediumship session for the first time. At the time, her contemporaries were surprised by her productivity, despite her frail health. Famous European mediums of the time, as well as the future Nicholas II of Russia, met her. During one of these sessions, the Khodynka accident was allegedly predicted to the prince.

In 1886, while in Paris, her first work was published. The historical novel, Episode from the Life of Tiberius, was psychographed in French (as were her first works), in which a tendency towards mystical themes could already be noted. It is believed that she was influenced by the spiritist doctrine of Allan Kardec, the theosophy of Helena Blavatsky, and the occultism of Papus.

During her temporary residence in Paris, Vera psychographed a series of historical novels, such as The Pharaoh Mernephtah, The Abbey of the Benedictines, Romance of a Queen, The Iron Chancellor of Ancient Egypt, Herculaneum, The Sign of Victory, St. Bartholomew's Night, among others, which attracted public attention not only for their captivating subjects but also for their exciting plots. For the The Iron Chancellor of Ancient Egypt, the French Academy of Sciences awarded her the title of "Officer of the French Academy." In 1907, the Russian Academy of Sciences awarded her an "Honorable Mention" for her novel The Czech Luminaries.

Her husband, Sergei Valerianovich Semenov, held a position in the imperial chancellery and in 1904, was appointed "kamerguer", a sort of secretary to Tsar Nicholas II. Semenov was a famous spiritualist and presided over the "Circle for Psychical Research" in Saint Petersburg.

After her return to Russia in 1890, the translation of her works into Russian began, and new works were also psychographed.

With the outbreak of the Russian Revolution (1917), Semenov was arrested and killed in Kresty prison, and Vera had to go into exile with her daughter, Tamara, in Estonia, where she experienced hardship. For more than two years, she had to work at the forest lumber mill, where the physical labor beyond her strength affected her health. She died of tuberculosis in 1924, in poverty.

== Works ==
=== Women's novels ===
- Marriage Market (Saint Petersburg, 1893)
- Rekensteins (Saint Petersburg, 1894)
- Paradise without Adam (1917)
- The Calvary of a Woman
- Revenge of the Jew
- Marsh Flower (1912)
- Cobra Capella (1902)
- St. Bartholomew's Day Massacre of 1896

=== Historical novels ===
- Ancient Egypt
  - Two Sphinxes (Saint Petersburg, 1892)
  - Queen Hatasu (Saint Petersburg, 1894)
  - Iron Chancellor of Ancient Egypt, Saint Petersburg, 1899 (insignia of the French Academy)
  - Pharaoh Mernefta (Saint Petersburg, 1907)
- Ancient Rome
  - With this you will conquer (Saint Petersburg, 1893)
  - Herculaneum (Saint Petersburg, 1895)
  - An Episode from the Life of Tiberius (Saint Petersburg, 1906)
- Middle Ages
  - At the Turning Point (Saint Petersburg, 1901)
  - Luminaries of the Czech lands, Saint Petersburg, 1904 (honorary mention of the Academy of Sciences)
  - Benedictine Abbey (Saint Petersburg, 1908)

=== Occult novels ===
- On a Neighboring Planet (Saint Petersburg, 1903)
- Hellish Charms (Saint Petersburg, 1910)
- In Another World (Saint Petersburg, 1911)
- The Sorcerer's Daughter (Saint Petersburg, 1913)
- In the Kingdom of Darkness (Saint Petersburg, 1914)
- The Loop of Death (1906)
- Evil Spirit (1932)
- From Darkness to Light (1904)
- Airplane (1933)
- Pentology
  - Elixir of Life (Saint Petersburg, 1901)
  - Magi (Saint Petersburg, 1902)
  - The Wrath of God (Saint Petersburg, 1910)
  - Death of the Planet (Saint Petersburg, 1911)
  - Legislators (1916)

=== English translations ===
- The Torch-Bearers of Bohemia. Tr. Juliet Soskice. London: Chatto-Windus, 1916; NY: McBride, 1917.
