= Swiney Prize =

British law award

The Swiney Prize, a British award made every five years by the Royal Society of Arts with the Royal College of Physicians, was set up by the will of George Swiney, an English physician who died in 1844.

The prize came to be awarded alternately for medical jurisprudence and general jurisprudence. New cups were designed, after an initial stable period when a pattern by Daniel Maclise was reused. The first new design came in 1919, by Melvin Oliver.

== George Swiney (1793–1844) ==
George Swiney, a physician, was the son of William Swiney (1748–1829), Admiral of the Red. He was born on 8-Jun-1793 at St Marylebone, Middlesex, England. He was educated at Edinburgh University, where he graduated M.D. in 1816. Having retired from practice, he settled in London, lived a secluded life, and acquired a reputation as an eccentric. He spent much time on his will and died at Grove Street, Camden Town, on 21 January 1844. He bequeathed £5,000 to the Society of Arts, to found a quinquennial prize for the best published essay on jurisprudence, the prize to be adjudicated jointly by the Society of Arts and the London College of Physicians

=== Lectureship in Geology ===
Swiney also left £5,000 to the British Museum to found a lectureship in geology, the lecturer to be an M.D. of Edinburgh. Holders have included

- William Benjamin Carpenter from 1847 to 1852 (First holder)
- Robert Edmond Grant from 1853
- Thomas Spencer Cobbold from 1868 to 1873
- Ramsay Traquair 1883 to 1887 and 1896 to 1900
- William Ramsey McNab from 1888 to his death in 1889
- Robert Francis Scharff from 1906 to 1908

== List of winners ==
- 1849 John Samuel Martin Fonblanque and John Ayrton Paris, Medical Jurisprudence, first award
- 1854 Leone Levi, Commercial Law of the World.
- 1859 Alfred Swaine Taylor, Medical Jurisprudence
- 1864 Henry James Sumner Maine, Ancient Law
- 1869, William Augustus Guy, Principles of Forensic Medicine
- 1874 Robert Joseph Phillimore, Commentaries on International Law
- 1879 Norman Chevers, Manual of Medical Jurisprudence for India
- 1884 Sheldon Amos
- 1889 Charles Meymott Tidy, Legal Medicine
- 1894 Thomas Erskine Holland, Elements of Jurisprudence
- 1899 John Dixon Mann
- 1905 Frederick Pollock and Frederic William Maitland, History of English Law before Edward the First
- 1909 Charles Arthur Mercier, Criminal Responsibility
- 1914 John William Salmond, Jurisprudence or the Theory of the Law
- 1919 Charles Arthur Mercier, Crime and Criminals
- 1924 Paul Vinogradoff
- 1929 Sydney Alfred Smith, Forensic Medicine
- 1934 William Searle Holdsworth
- 1939 James Couper Brash and John Glaister, Medico-Legal Aspects of the Ruxton Case
- 1944 Carlton Kemp Allen, Law in the Making
- 1949 John Glaister, Medical Jurisprudence and Toxicology
- 1954 George Whitecross Paton, Textbook of Jurisprudence (2nd edition)
- 1959 Keith Simpson, Forensic Medicine (3rd edition)
- 1964 Julius Stone, The Province and Function of Law, and Glanville Williams Criminal Law: The General Part
- 1969 Francis Edward Camps, Gradwohl's Legal Medicine (2nd edition)
- 1974 Stroud Francis Charles Milsom
- 1979 John Kenyon Mason, Forensic Medicine for Lawyers and his edition of The Pathology of Violent Injury
- 1984 Patrick Atiyah, Promises, Morals and Law
- 1989 P. D. G. Skegg, Law, Ethics and Medicine: Studies in Medical Law
- 1994 John Kelly, A Short History of Western Legal Theory
- 2000 Ronald Dworkin
- 2004 Nicola Lacey, A Life of H.L.A. Hart: The Nightmare and the Noble Dream
