= Nicola Lacey =

British legal scholar (born 1958)

Nicola Lacey CBE FBA
- Born: Nicola Mary Lacey; 3 February 1958 (age 68)
- Spouse: David Soskice (m. 1991)
- Awards: Swiney Prize, Royal Society of Arts (2004); Hans Sigrist Prize, University of Bern (2011); Honorary Bencher of Inner Temple (2011); International Prize, Law and Society Association (2022)

Academic background
- Education: University College London; University College, Oxford

Academic work
- Discipline: Law
- Sub-discipline: Criminal law; Criminal justice; Criminal responsibility; Political economy of punishment
- Institutions: University College London; University of Oxford; New College, Oxford; Birkbeck, University of London; London School of Economics; All Souls College, Oxford

Nicola Mary Lacey, CBE FBA (born 3 February 1958) is a British legal scholar who specialises in criminal law. Her research interests include criminal justice, criminal responsibility, and the political economy of punishment. Since 2013, she has been Professor of Law, Gender and Social Policy at the London School of Economics (LSE). She was previously Professor of Criminal Law and Legal Theory at LSE (1998–2010), and then Professor of Criminal Law and Legal Theory at the University of Oxford and a Senior Research Fellow of All Souls College, Oxford (2010–2013).

== Early life and education ==
Lacey was born on 3 February 1958 to Gillian Wroth and John McAndrew. She studied law at University College London, graduating with a first class Bachelor of Laws (LLB) degree in 1979. She then undertook postgraduate studies at University College, Oxford, completing a Bachelor of Civil Law (BCL) degree in 1981.

== Academic career ==
From 1981 to 1984, Lacey was a lecturer in the Faculty of Laws of University College London. In 1984, she joined the University of Oxford where she had been appointed a university lecturer and elected a Fellow of New College, Oxford. Then, from 1995 to 1997, she was a professor of law at Birkbeck College, University of London. In 1998, she joined the London School of Economics (LSE) as professor of criminal law and legal theory. During her time at LSE, she held a number of visiting appointments at other universities: she was a fellow of the Berlin Institute for Advanced Study from 1999 to 2000, a visiting professor at the New York University School of Law in 2001 and 2003, an adjunct professor to the Social and Political Theory Program of the Research School of Social Science, Australian National University from 2002 to 2005/2006, a visiting professor to the Center for Ethics, Politics and Economics at Yale University in 2004, and a visiting fellow to the Center for European Studies at Harvard University in 2007.

In 2010, Lacey moved to the University of Oxford, where she had been elected a senior research fellow of All Souls College, Oxford. On 1 October 2010, she was awarded a Title of Distinction by the university as Professor of Criminal Law and Legal Theory. She was distinguished visiting professor to the University of Minnesota Law School in April 2012, and a visiting professor at Harvard Law School in 2013. Having left Oxford in 2013, she was appointed a Quondam Fellow of All Souls: this is a type of fellowship that allows former fellows to maintain an official link with the college. In September 2013, Lacey returned to the London School of Economics, where she had been appointed professor of law, gender and social policy. She was a distinguished global fellow with the Hauser Global Law School Program of New York University School of Law for the 2014 spring semester.

== Other work ==
From 2010 to 2013, Lacey was the chair of the Law Section of the British Academy. From 2014 to 2016, she was a member of the council of Liberty, a British advocacy group campaigning for civil liberties and human rights. Since September 2015, she has been a member of the board of the British Museum.

== Personal life ==
In 1991, Lacey married David Soskice.

== Honours ==
In 2001, Lacey was elected a Fellow of the British Academy (FBA), the United Kingdom's national academy for the humanities and social sciences. In the 2017 New Year Honours, she was appointed a Commander of the Order of the British Empire (CBE) "For services to Law, Justice and Gender Politics".

In 2004, Lacey was awarded the Swiney Prize by the Royal Society of Arts for her book A Life of H.L.A. Hart: The Nightmare and the Noble Dream. The book was also shortlisted for the James Tait Black Prize for Biography and for the British Academy Book Prize. She was made an honorary fellow of New College, Oxford in 2007 and of University College, Oxford (her alma mater) in 2010. In 2011, she was awarded the Hans Sigrist Prize by the University of Bern. In 2011, she was appointed an honorary bencher of Inner Temple, one of the Inns of Court of England and Wales. In 2018 she received a Doctor of Laws from the University of Edinburgh. In 2022, the Law and Society Association awarded her its International Prize, noting: "Professor Lacey transformed the fields of critical criminology and penology and opened up new areas of inquiry and advocacy for reforming criminal justice systems around the globe. Her work has advanced sociolegal scholarship in these key areas. Professor Lacey has also made significant contributions to feminist legal-thought and has written/co-edited 11 books".

== Selected works ==
- Lacey, Nicola (1988). State Punishment: political principles and community values. London: Routledge. ISBN 978-0415001717.
- Lacey, Nicola; Wells, Celia; Meure, Dirk (1990). Reconstructing criminal law: critical perspectives on crime and criminal process (1st ed.). London: Weidenfeld and Nicolson. ISBN 978-0297820277.
- Frazer, Elizabeth; Lacey, Nicola (1993). The Politics of Community: A Feminist Critique of the Liberal-Communitarian Debate. Toronto: University of Toronto Press. ISBN 978-0802072207.
- Lacey, Nicola, ed. (1994). A Reader on Criminal Justice. Oxford: Oxford University Press. ISBN 978-0198763628.
- Lacey, Nicola (1998). Unspeakable Subjects: Feminist Essays in Legal and Social Theory. Oxford: Bloomsbury Publishing. ISBN 978-1901362336.
- Lacey, Nicola (2004). A Life of H. L. A. Hart: The Nightmare and the Noble Dream. Oxford: Oxford University Press. ISBN 978-0199274970.
- Lacey, Nicola; Wells, Celia; Quick, Oliver (2006). Reconstructing Criminal Law: Text and Materials (3rd ed.). Cambridge: Cambridge University Press. ISBN 978-0521606042.
- Lacey, Nicola (2008). The Prisoners' Dilemma: Political Economy and Punishment in Contemporary Democracies. Cambridge: Cambridge University Press. ISBN 978-0521899475.
- Lacey, Nicola (2008). Women, Crime, and Character From Moll Flanders to Tess of the D'Urbervilles. Oxford: Oxford University Press. ISBN 978-0199544363.
- Lacey, Nicola (2016). In Search of Criminal Responsibility: Ideas, Interests and Institutions. Oxford: Oxford University Press. ISBN 978-0199248209.
- Lacey, Nicola; Soskice, David; Cheliotis, Leonidas; Xenakis, Sappho, eds. (2021). Tracing the Relationship between Inequality, Crime and Punishment: Space, Time and Politics. Oxford: Oxford University Press. ISBN 978-0197266922.
