= Frank Soskice =

British lawyer and Labour Party politician (1902–1979)

The Right Honourable The Lord Stow Hill PC QC
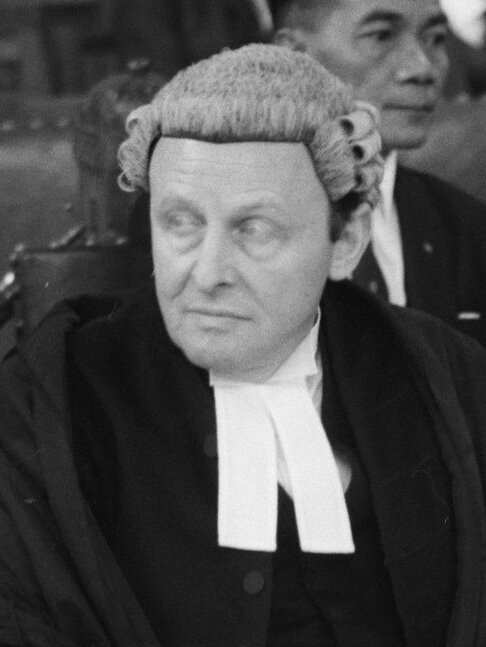
- Frank Soskice in 1961

Lord Privy Seal
- In office 23 December 1965 – 6 April 1966
- Prime Minister: Harold Wilson
- Preceded by: Frank Pakenham
- Succeeded by: Frank Pakenham

Home Secretary
- In office 18 October 1964 – 23 December 1965
- Prime Minister: Harold Wilson
- Preceded by: Henry Brooke
- Succeeded by: Roy Jenkins

Shadow Attorney General for England and Wales
- In office 27 November 1956 – 18 October 1964
- Leader: Hugh Gaitskell; George Brown; Harold Wilson
- Preceded by: Lynn Ungoed-Thomas
- Succeeded by: John Hobson

Attorney General for England and Wales
- In office 24 April 1951 – 26 October 1951
- Prime Minister: Clement Attlee
- Preceded by: Hartley Shawcross
- Succeeded by: Sir Lionel Heald

Solicitor General for England and Wales
- In office 4 August 1945 – 24 April 1951
- Prime Minister: Clement Attlee
- Preceded by: Walter Monckton
- Succeeded by: Sir Lynn Ungoed-Thomas

Member of Parliament for Newport
- In office 6 July 1956 – 10 March 1966
- Preceded by: Peter Freeman
- Succeeded by: Roy Hughes

Member of Parliament for Sheffield Neepsend
- In office 5 April 1950 – 6 May 1955
- Preceded by: Harry Morris
- Succeeded by: Constituency abolished

Member of Parliament for Birkenhead East
- In office 5 July 1945 – 3 February 1950
- Preceded by: Henry Graham White
- Succeeded by: Constituency abolished

Personal details
- Born: Frank Soskice; 23 July 1902 Geneva, Switzerland
- Died: 1 January 1979 (aged 76) London, England
- Party: Labour
- Spouse: Susan Isabella Cloudsley Hunter
- Children: David Soskice
- Parents: David Soskice; Juliet Hueffner
- Relatives: Ford Madox Ford (uncle); Oliver Madox Hueffer (uncle); Ford Madox Brown (great-grandfather); Francis Hueffer (grandfather); Catherine Madox Brown (grandmother); Lucy Madox Brown (half-great-aunt); William Michael Rossetti (great-uncle)
- Education: Balliol College, Oxford

Frank Soskice, Baron Stow Hill, PC, QC (23 July 1902 – 1 January 1979) was a British lawyer and Labour Party politician.

== Background and education ==
Soskice was born in Geneva on 23 July 1902. His father was the exiled Jewish-Russian revolutionary journalist David Soskice; his mother Juliet Hueffner was the daughter of Catherine Madox Brown and Francis Hueffer, and so granddaughter of artist Ford Madox Brown, niece of Dante Gabriel Rossetti and sister of Ford Madox Ford.

Soskice was educated at the Froebel Demonstration School, St Paul's School, London, and Balliol College, Oxford. He studied law and was called to the Bar at the Inner Temple in 1926. He served in the British Army with the Oxfordshire and Buckinghamshire Light Infantry during World War II.

He served first in East Africa and then in the Political Warfare Executive in Cairo. Later he worked with the Special Operations Executive, SOE, in London.

His son, David Soskice, is an economist.

== Political career ==
Following the war, he was elected to Parliament as a Labour Member of Parliament (MP) for Birkenhead East in the 1945 general election, and became Solicitor General, receiving the customary knighthood, in the government of Clement Attlee, serving in that office throughout Attlee's government. He was also, briefly, UK delegate to the United Nations General Assembly. As Solicitor General, Soskice was viewed as an important advocate for the government in the House of Commons. His constituency was abolished in the 1950 election, when he unsuccessfully fought Bebington, but he was soon returned to the House of Commons at a by-election in the Sheffield Neepsend constituency, where the sitting MP Harry Morris stood down to make way for Soskice. In April 1951, he became Attorney General.

In 1952, Soskice joined the shadow cabinet, and his fortunes rose in 1955 with the election of his close ally Hugh Gaitskell as party leader, although he continued his legal practice as well. His Sheffield Neepsend constituency was abolished for the 1955 general election, but in 1956 he won a by-election in the Newport seat in Monmouthshire that he would hold until he retired.

When Labour returned to government in 1964 under Harold Wilson, Soskice became Home Secretary. In this office he did not impress Wilson – he was in poor health, and he botched the response to an electoral boundary change dispute in Northamptonshire and accepted weakening amendments to the Race Relations Act of 1965.

In December 1965, Soskice was relieved of his Home Office responsibilities and made Lord Privy Seal. He had, though, ensured Government support for Sydney Silverman's Private Members Bill, passed on 28 October 1965, which suspended the death penalty in the United Kingdom for five years (except for treason). This reform is sometimes erroneously included with the Jenkins reforms which followed. In fact when the death penalty for murder was finally abolished in 1969, James Callaghan was Home Secretary.

In 1966, Soskice retired, and was created a life peer as "Baron Stow Hill", of Newport in the County of Monmouth on 7 June 1966. Stow Hill is a steep hill in Newport, which runs from the city centre up to St. Woolos Cathedral.

According to Yes Minister co-writer Antony Jay, the case of Timothy Evans (who was wrongfully hanged for the murder of his wife and daughter) was part of the inspiration for the television satire because of Soskice's refusal to reopen the case despite having himself appealed for an inquiry while in opposition.

== Death ==
Soskice died in Hampstead on 1 January 1979, aged 76.

== Arms ==
Coat of arms of Frank Soskice
Crest Between two wings addorsed Azure a paint brush and a quill pen in saltire Proper both tipped Gules. Escutcheon Argent perched on a triple mount in base Vert charged with a portcullis chained Or a dove wings expanded and in the beak a ship of olive Proper in chief two portcullises chained Gules. Supporters On either side a pegasus Azure pendant from a chain about the neck a portcullis Or. Motto Ancient Greek: ΗΜΕΙΣ Δ' ΟΙΑ ΤΕ ΦΥΛΛΑ, romanized: Hēmeis, d'oia te phylla, lit. 'We, like the leaves'

Parliament of the United Kingdom
Preceded by Graham White	Member of Parliament for Birkenhead East; 1945–1950	Constituency abolished
Preceded by Harry Morris	Member of Parliament for Sheffield Neepsend; 1950–1955	Constituency abolished
Preceded by Peter Freeman	Member of Parliament for Newport; 1956–1966	Succeeded by Roy Hughes
Legal offices
Preceded by Walter Monckton	Solicitor General for England and Wales; 1945–1951	Succeeded by Sir Lynn Ungoed-Thomas
Preceded by Hartley Shawcross	Attorney General for England and Wales; 1951	Succeeded by Sir Lionel Heald
Political offices
Preceded by Henry Brooke	Home Secretary; 1964–1965	Succeeded by Roy Jenkins
Preceded by The Earl of Longford	Lord Privy Seal; 1965–1966	Succeeded by The Earl of Longford
