= Juliet Soskice =

English translator and writer

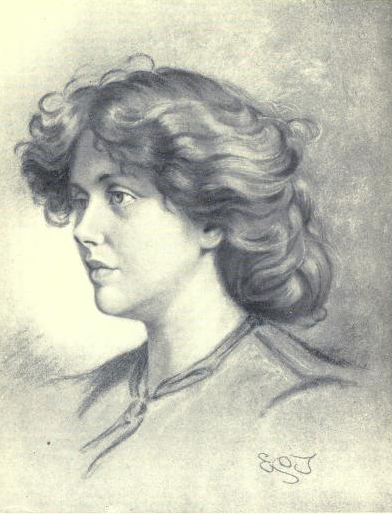
- Juliet Soskice
- Born: Juliet Catherine Emma Hueffer; 1887; London, England
- Died: 1944 (aged 56–57)
- Spouse: David Soskice (1866–1941) (m. 1902; died 1941)
- Children: 3 (including Frank Soskice)
- Parent(s): Francis Hueffer (father); Catherine Madox Brown (mother)
- Relatives: Ford Madox Ford (brother); Oliver Madox Hueffer (brother); Ford Madox Brown (maternal grandfather); Johann Hermann Hüffer (paternal grandfather); Lucy Madox Brown (half-aunt)

Juliet Catherine Emma Soskice (née Hueffer; 1881–1944) was an English translator and writer.

== Life ==
She was the daughter of Francis Hueffer and Catherine Madox Brown, and younger sister of the novelist Ford Madox Ford who was born in 1873. After her father died in 1889, there were changes in the household. The legal position was that Charles Rowley and Theodore Watts acted as trustees.

Juliet lived in London with Lucy Madox Brown, her mother's older half-sister and her husband William Michael Rossetti. Her mother went to live with Ford Madox Brown, her father, with her sons Ford and Oliver. The houses were two doors apart.

Juliet was therefore brought up with the Rossetti children, including Olivia, Gabriel Arthur and Helen. In the early 1890s she and Ford knew Edward Garnett and his sister Olive, the children of Richard Garnett. The Hueffer, Garnett and Rossetti families were close, and in London's St Edmund's Terrace near Regent's Park were at times in the 1890s neighbours.

In her youth Juliet was known as a musician. She later turned to literature. The relationships between the families evolved: Juliet remained close to the Rossettis, but her brothers didn't, and the Rossetti children protected their political activities, anarchist and socialist, from casual attention. The brothers also distanced themselves from the Garnetts and their Surrey home at Limpsfield, which they found too closely aligned to the Fabian Society. Juliet's future husband David Soskice entered this circle through the Garnetts finding him a house near Limpsfield Chart in 1898.

== Works ==
In 1917, Soskice translated the long poem Who Can Be Happy and Free in Russia? by Nikolai Nekrasov. Other works included:

- The Torch Bearers of Bohemia (1916), translator from the 1907 novel Svetochi Chekhii by Vera Ivanovna Kryzhanovskaia.
- Chapters from Childhood: Reminiscences of an Artist's Granddaughter (1921), memoirs.
- Poems by Nicholas Nekrasov (London, 1929), translator.
- Short stories, as "J. Saturin", published in the English Review.
- Five novels.

She assisted Constance Garnett in translations from Russian. Rebecca West's last novel The Birds Fall Down (1966) is based on the life of Yevno Azef, and West acknowledged influence on it by Ford Madox Ford as well as Juliet Soskice, whom she calls a "pioneer translator" from Russian and the original source from which she heard Azef's story.

== Family ==
In 1902, Juliet married the revolutionary journalist David Soskice (1866–1941), as his second wife. The couple appear as Cyril Brandetski and Ophelia Bransdon in her brother's 1911 novel The Simple Life Limited. They had three sons, one being Frank Soskice. David had a son Victor by his first wife Anna Sophia Johansen, a marriage which ended in divorce in August 1902.
