= Catherine Madox Brown =

English Pre-Raphaelite artist (1850–1927)

Catherine Madox Brown Hueffer
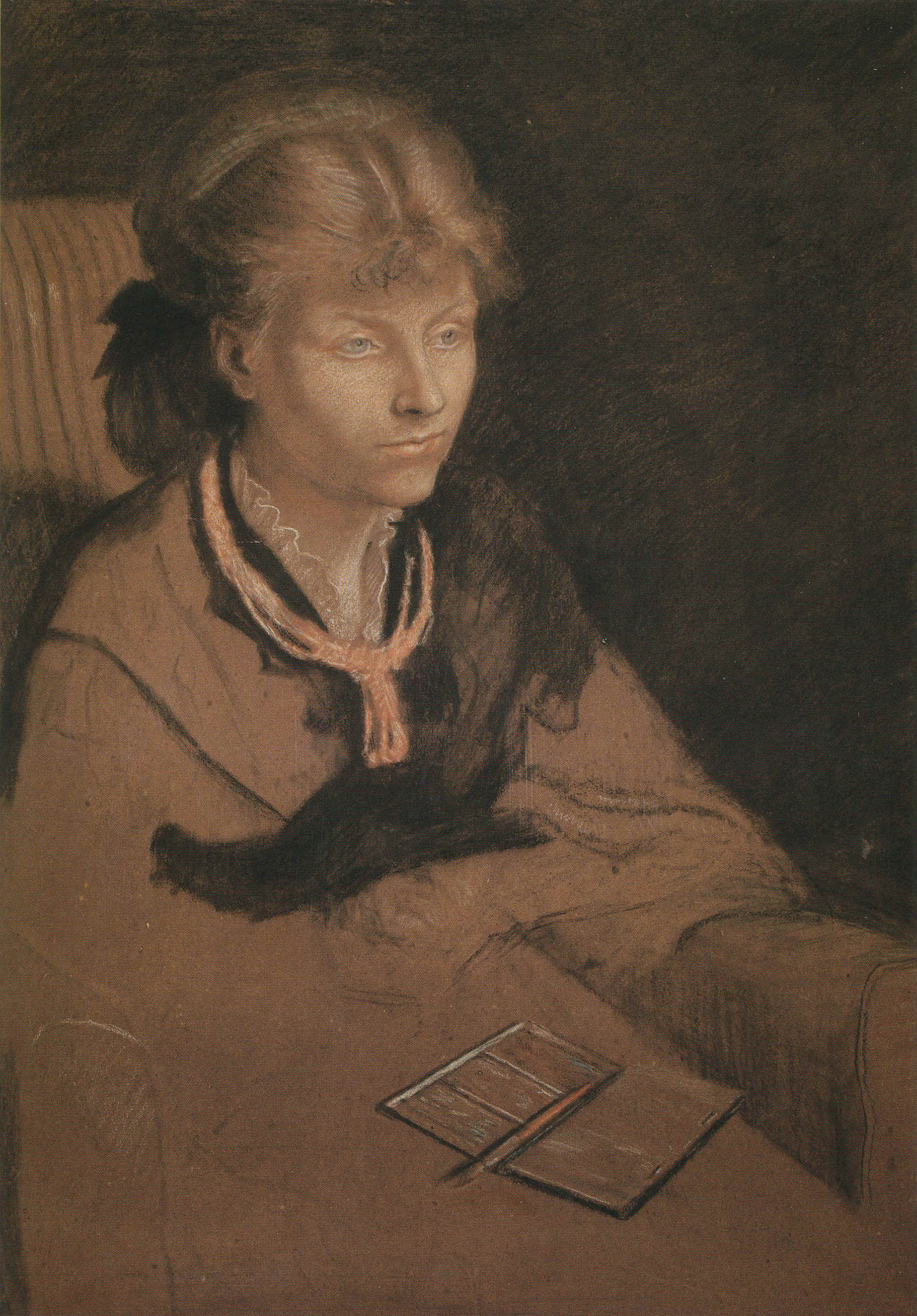
- Drawing of Brown by Ford Madox Brown
- Born: Catherine Madox Brown; 11 November 1850; London, England
- Died: 1927 (aged 76–77)
- Education: Queen's College, Harley Street
- Movement: Pre-Raphaelite Brotherhood; Aesthetic Movement; Arts and Crafts Movement
- Spouse: Francis Hueffer (m. 1872; died 1889)
- Children: Ford Madox Ford; Oliver Madox Hueffer; Juliet Soskice
- Father: Ford Madox Brown
- Relatives: Lucy Madox Brown (half-sister)

Catherine Madox Brown Hueffer (11 November 1850 – 1927) was an English painter and model associated with the Pre-Raphaelites. She was the daughter of painter Ford Madox Brown and the wife of writer Francis Hueffer.

== Early life ==
Brown was born out of wedlock as the first child of Ford Madox Brown and Emma Matilda Hill on 11 November 1850 in London. She was named after her maternal grandmother and was also known as Cathy. Brown and her mother posed as the mother and child in Pretty Baa-Lambs. Brown's parents married in 1853.

== Marriage and family ==
Brown married Francis Hueffer on 3 September 1872. They had two surviving sons, Ford Madox Ford (1873–1939) and Oliver Madox Hueffer (1877–1931), both writers. Their daughter, Juliet Catherine Emma (1881–1944), married Russian revolutionary journalist David Soskice, with whom she had three sons including Frank Soskice, future Home Secretary.

Francis Hueffer died in January 1889. Emma left Catherine all of her property after her death in September 1890.

== Artistic career ==
Brown began painting along with her half-sister Lucy Madox Brown, while they modelled and worked as assistants under their father. Other female Pre-Raphaelite artists such as Georgiana Burne-Jones, the sister of Thomas Seddon and Marie Spartali Stillman also took lessons in the same studio.

== List of works ==
Portrait of her father Ford Madox Brown at the Easel, watercolour, 1870.
At the Opera, watercolour and pencil, 1869.
Wandering Thoughts, watercolour heightened with bodycolour, 1875.
Portrait of Laura, wife of Sir Lawrence Alma-Tadema, watercolour, 1872, 50.8 x 33 cm, Exh. The Fine Art and Antiques fair Olympia, London, 2000 by Campbell Wilson (London).

== Exhibitions ==
'Uncommon Power': Lucy and Catherine Madox Brown at the Watts Gallery 28 September 2021 – 20 February 2022.

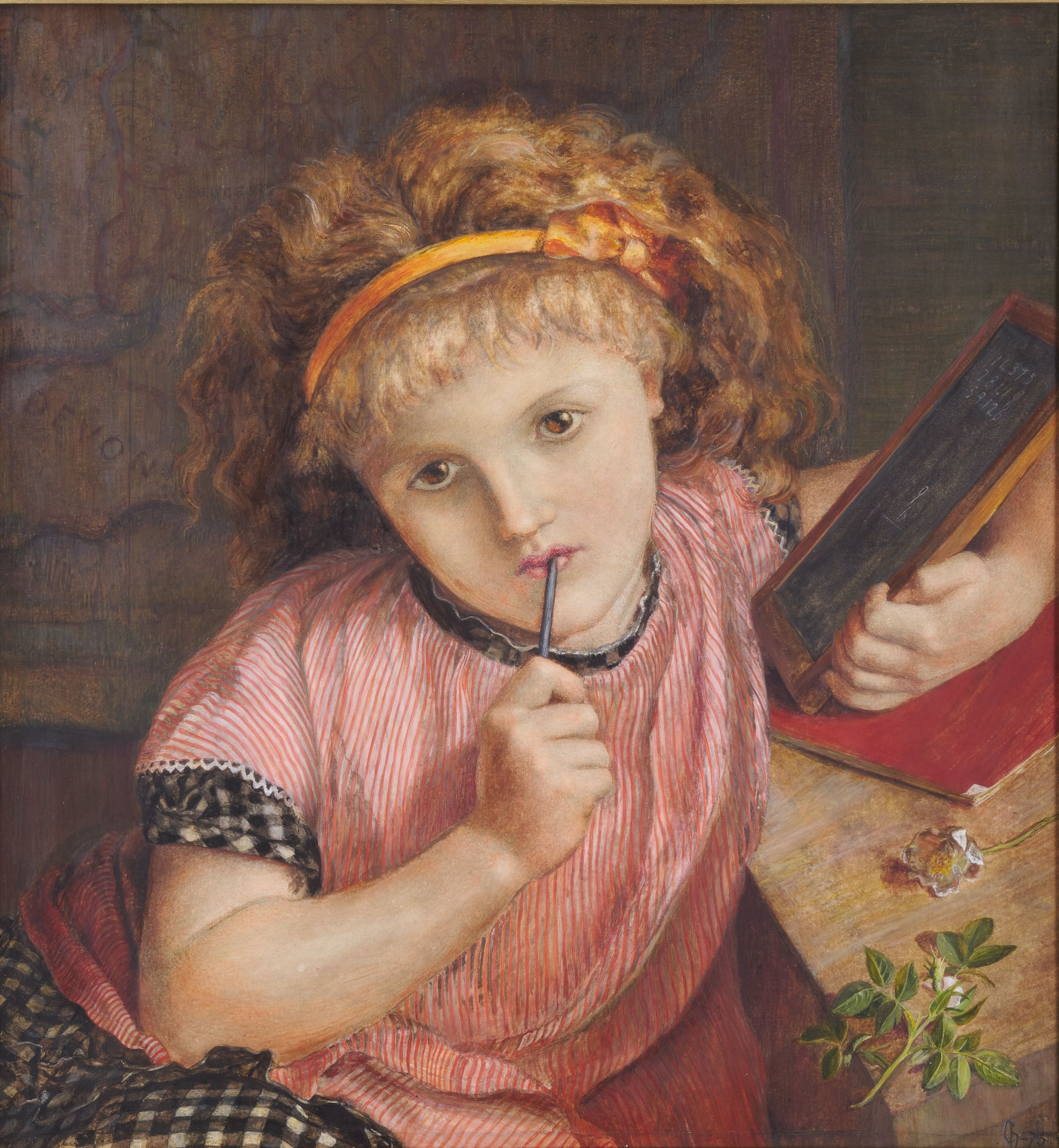
"A Deep Problem 9 and 6 make - " by Catherine Madox Brown. 1875. Watercolour. Birmingham Museums Trust.

== As a model ==
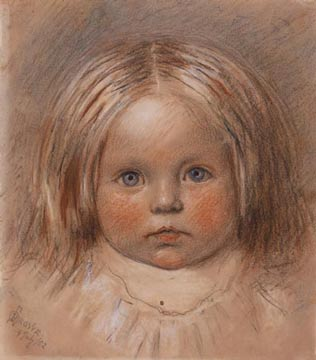
Catherine Madox Brown, Portrait of the artist's second daughter by Ford Madox Brown, 1852, Walker Art Gallery, 19 cm x 16.5 cm, Accession Number WAG10507

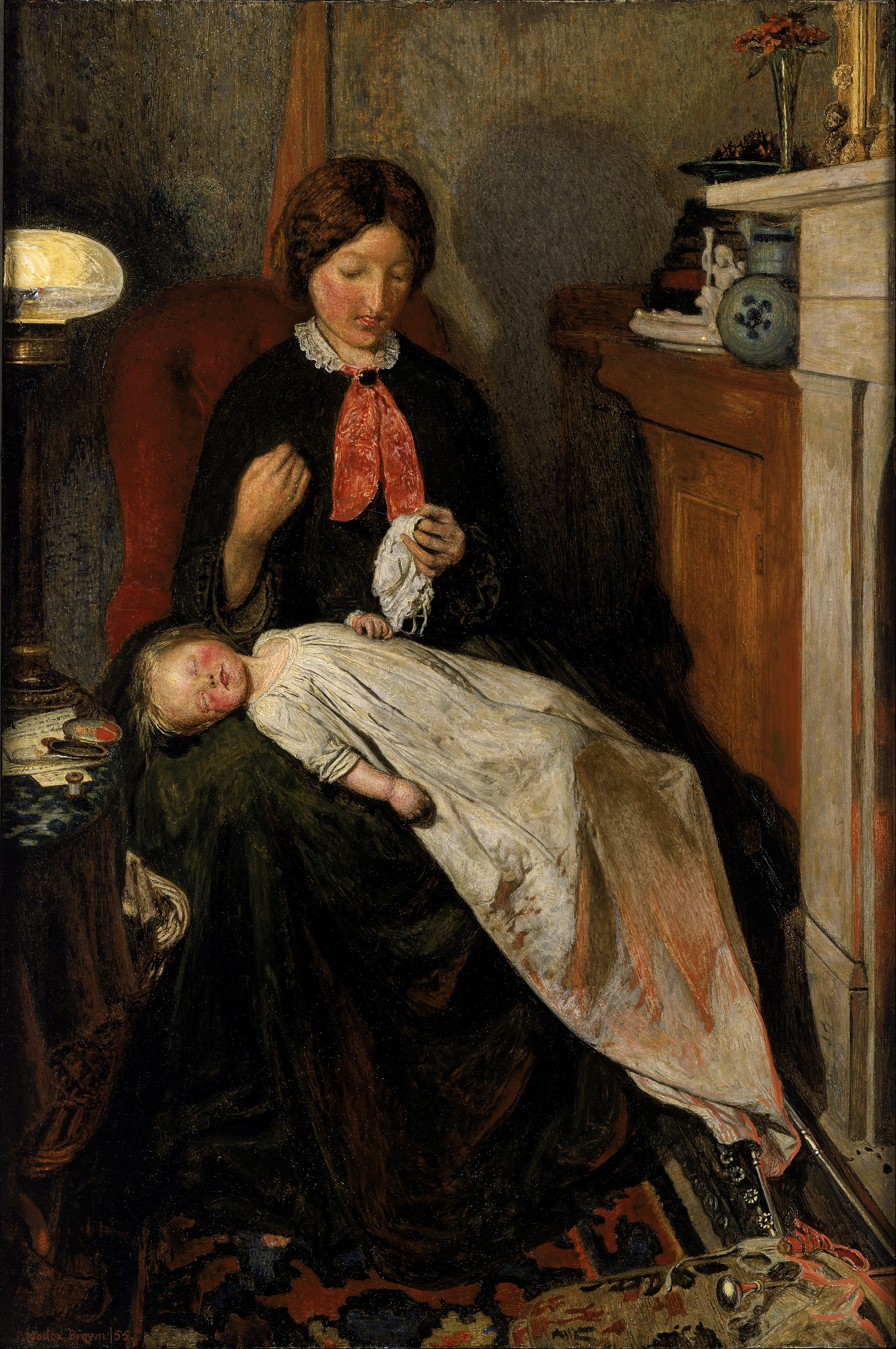
Waiting: an English fireside of 1854-55 by Ford Madox Brown

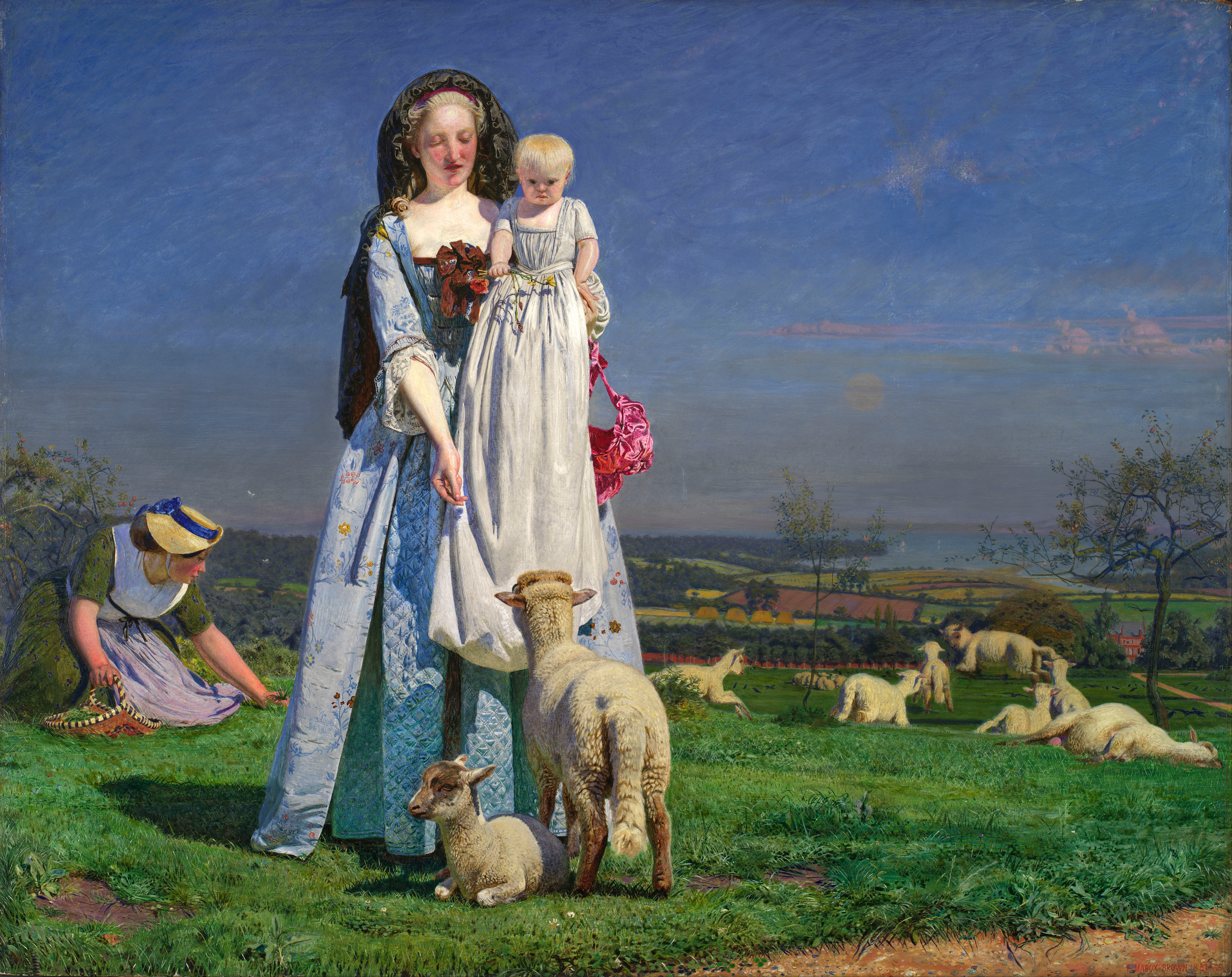
The baby in Pretty Baa-Lambs by Ford Madox Brown, oil on panel, 1851/1859, Birmingham Museums and Art Gallery

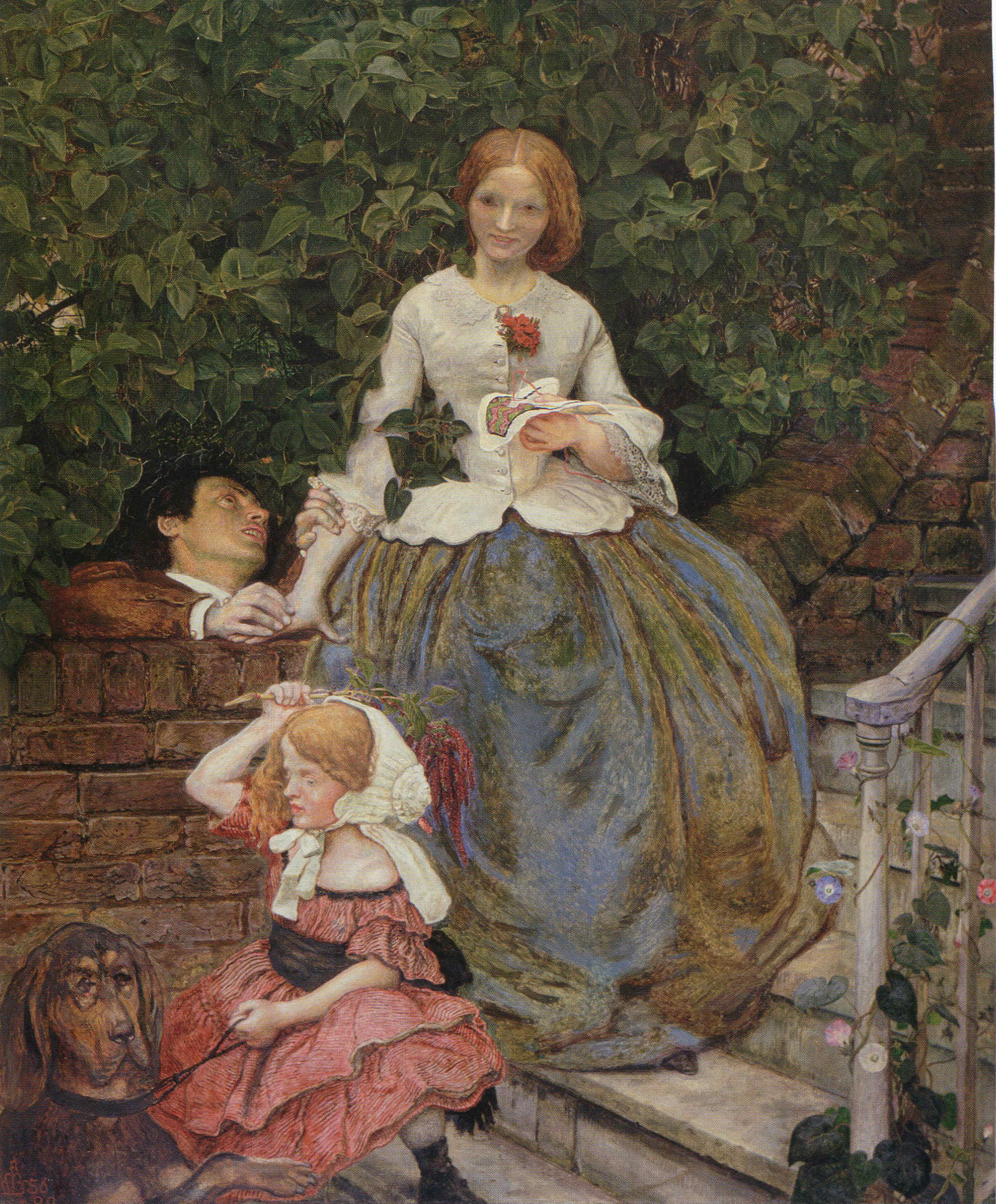
Stages of Cruelty (Catherine Madox Brown is the child), 1857, Manchester Art Gallery

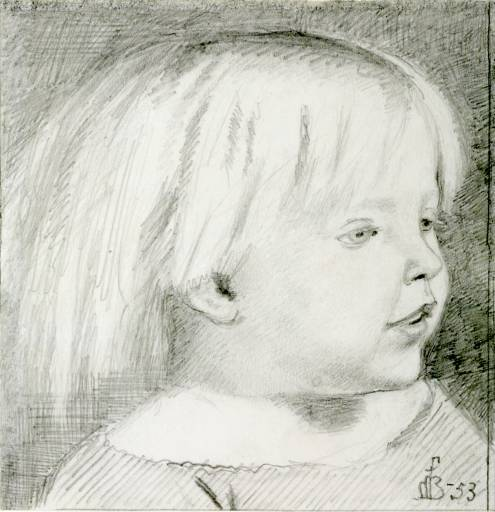
Cathy Madox Brown, pencil, Tate Gallery
