= Oliver Madox Hueffer =

English author, playwright and war correspondent (1877–1931)

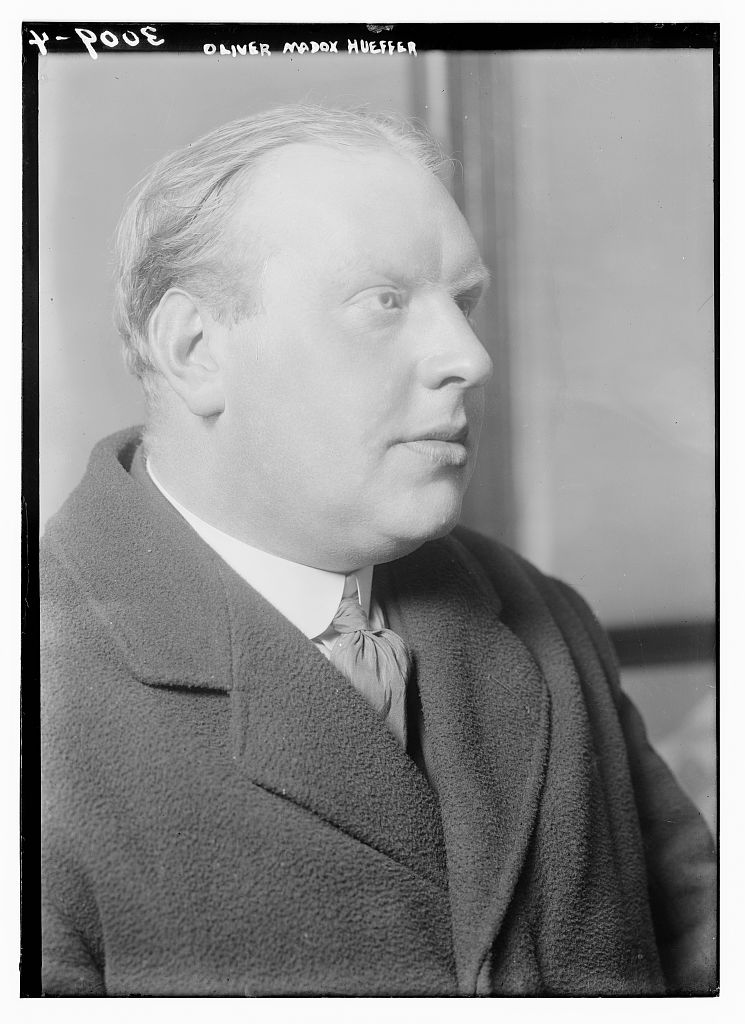
- Born: Oliver Franz Hueffer; 9 January 1876; Surrey, England
- Died: 22 June 1931 (aged 55); Hammersmith, England
- Parent(s): Francis Hueffer; Catherine Madox Brown
- Relatives: Ford Madox Hueffer (brother); Juliet Soskice (sister); Frank Soskice (nephew); Ford Madox Brown (maternal grandfather); Lucy Madox Brown (half-aunt); Olivia Rossetti Agresti (cousin); Johann Hermann Hüffer (paternal grandfather)

Oliver Madox Hueffer (born Oliver Franz Hueffer; 1877 – 22 June 1931), was an English author, playwright, and war correspondent.

== Biography ==
Heuffer was born in 1876 in Surrey to Catherine Madox Brown, an artist, and Francis Hueffer, a German-English music critic and librettist. His brother was the writer Ford Madox Ford (born Ford Madox Heuffer), and his sister was the English translator and writer Juliet Soskice (née Hueffer). The Pre-Raphaelite painter Ford Madox Brown was his maternal grandfather.

Hueffner graduated from the University College School, in London, then pursued university studies at several European institutions.

While in search of employment on his first visit to New York City, he wrote a column, "A Vagabond in New York", published in Truth. These collected writings resulted in his 1913 book by the same title, published by the John Lane Company. In it, he colourfully recounted his penurious and picaresque existence living in the public spaces of an unfamiliar city, finding, due to his "provincial" accent and English phraseology, no immediate career in writing and only dead-end jobs, including bartender, delicatessen assistant and sideshow "fakir". He aspired to become a passable speaker of "the President's English" within a year or two. He recounted that his return trip to England saw him travelling in steerage, stoking coal on the steamer which carried him home.

While covering the Mexican Revolution for the Daily Express, he was reported in 1910 to have been "executed and buried" for spying on behalf of the Americans, having been court-martialed and sentenced to death; British intervention saw him safely out of the country. During the First World War, he fought for the British, receiving a commission in the 10th battalion of the East Surrey regiment in October 1915. Wounded at Thiepval in September 1916, during the battle of the Somme, he served in 1918 as a railway transport officer.

For ten years, he was the music critic for The Times.

In all, he resided in five major cities: London, Paris, Berlin, Rome and New York City, providing him with much of the source material for his books and plays.

== Books ==
Six of his novels were written under the pseudonym of "Jane Wardle".

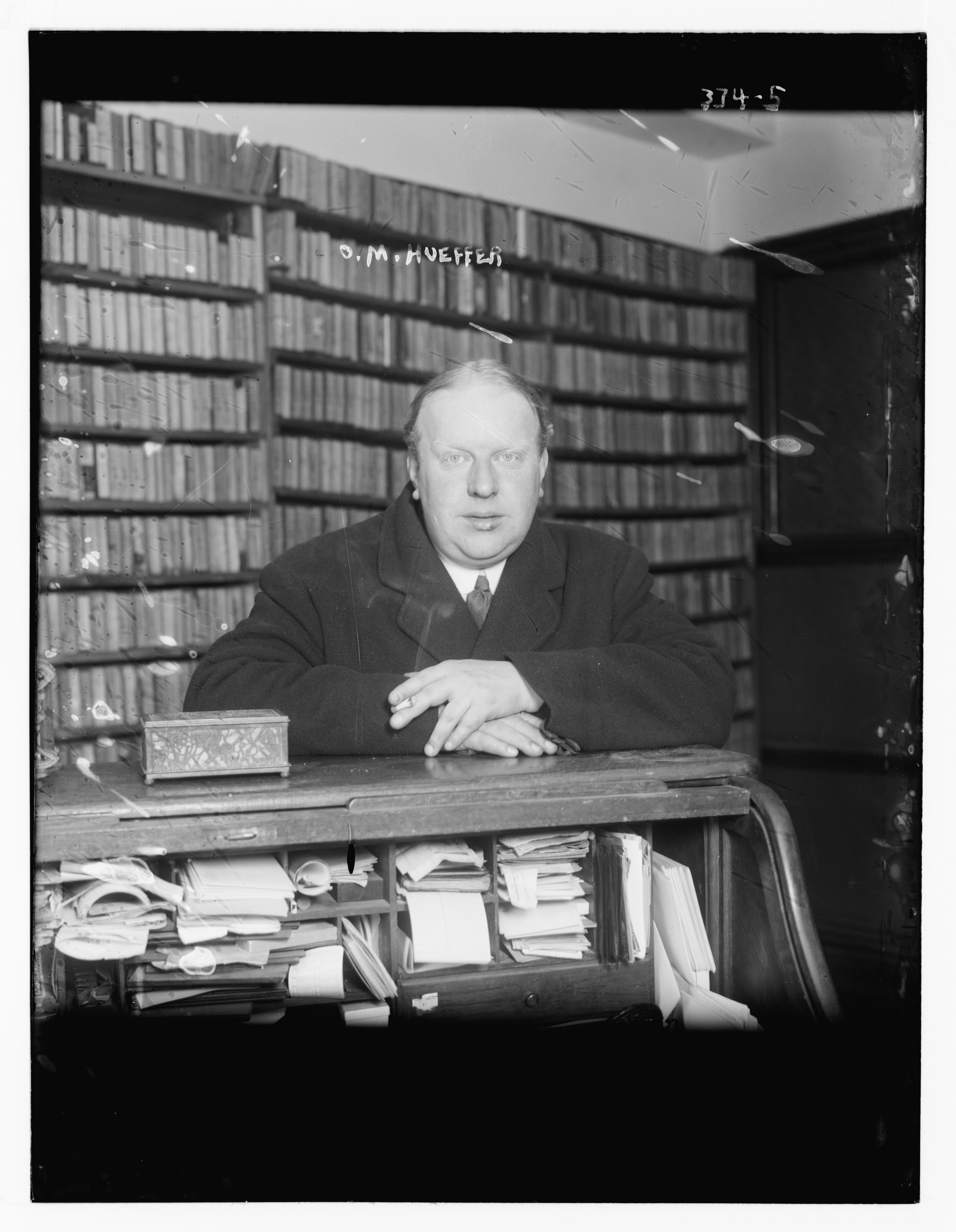
Oliver Madox Hueffer

- French France (1929) cultural commentary
- Some of the English (1930) cultural commentary
- Monographs on Various Eighteenth-Century Painters ()
- The Artistic Temperament () novel
- Marjorie Pigeon ()
- The Pasque Flower ()
- Little Grey Man a novel (1910)

== Plays ==
- The Lord of Latimer Street (1907)
- Fine Feathers ()
- The Pilgrim ()
- A Scarecrow Emperor ()
- Down Stream ()

== Works ==
- The Book of Witches, New York, 1909.

== Death ==
He died on 22 June 1931.
