= Francis Hueffer =

German-English writer on music (1845–1889)

- Born: Franz Carl Christoph Johann Hüffer; 22 May 1845
- Died: 19 January 1889 (aged 43)
- Spouse: Catherine Madox Brown
- Children: Ford Madox Ford; Oliver Madox Hueffer; Juliet Soskice

Francis Hueffer (born Franz Carl Christoph Johann Hüffer; 22 May 1845 – 19 January 1889) was a German-English writer on music, music critic, and librettist.

== Biography ==
Hueffer was born in Münster, Kingdom of Prussia, on 22 May 1845 to Johann Hermann Hüffer, a politician and editor, and his second wife, Maria Theresia Julia (Julia) Kaufmann, sister of Leopold Kaufmann, Chief Burgomaster (in German Oberbürgermeister) of Bonn, and of Alexander Kaufmann, poet and folklorist. He was the youngest of the ten children born to his parents' marriage. His father had had seven other children from his first marriage to Amalia Hosius. His paternal grandmother, Maria Sophia Franziska Hüffer (née Aschendorff), was the daughter of Wilhelm Aschendorff, himself the son of the founder of Aschendorff Verlags (Aschendorff publishing house; now Aschendorff Group). He studied modern philology and music in London, Paris, Berlin, and Leipzig, and earned a Ph.D. in 1869 from the University of Göttingen for a critical edition of the works of Guillem de Cabestant, a 12th-century troubadour.

Following his studies, he moved to London in 1869 as a writer on music, and from 1878 worked as chief music critic for The Times, succeeding James William Davison. He wrote a number of books on music, especially on music history and biography; edited the Great Musicians series for Novello & Co; and translated the correspondence of Richard Wagner and Franz Liszt to English. He also wrote the libretti for several English operas: Alexander Mackenzie's Colomba and The Troubadour, and Frederic Hymen Cowen's Sleeping Beauty. Also succeeding Davison, he became editor of the Musical World in 1886 and actuated a more musically progressive attitude. He fell ill in the summer of 1888 and died of cancer on 19 January 1889.

Hueffer's wife, Catherine Madox Brown, was the daughter of Ford Madox Brown and the half-sister of Lucy Madox Brown and an artist and model associated with the Pre-Raphaelites. Their sons, Ford Madox Hueffer (better known as Ford Madox Ford) and Oliver Madox Hueffer, were writers and their daughter Juliet Catherine Emma Hueffer was the mother of Frank Soskice.

== Selected writings ==
- Richard Wagner and the Music of the Future (1874) (reissued by Cambridge University Press, 2009; ISBN 978-1-108-00474-9) (Internet Archive)
- The Troubadours: A History of Provençal Life and Literature in the Middle Ages (1878) (Internet Archive)
- Musical Studies: A Series of Contributions, a collection of his articles from The Times and Fortnightly Review (1880) (reissued by Cambridge University Press, 2009; ISBN 978-1-108-00473-2) (Internet Archive)
- Wagner, in the Great Musicians series (1881) (reissued by Cambridge University Press, 2009; ISBN 978-1-108-00475-6) (Internet Archive)
- Italian and Other Studies (1883) (Google Books)
- Half a Century of Music in England: Essays Towards a History (1889; 2nd ed. 1898) (reissued by Cambridge University Press, 2009; ISBN 978-1-108-00472-5) (Internet Archive)
- Correspondence of Wagner and Liszt (1889; as translator) (reissued by Cambridge University Press, 2009; ISBN 978-1-108-00474-9) (Project Gutenberg: vol. 1; vol. 2)
