= Sheffield Neepsend =

Parliamentary constituency in the United Kingdom, 1950–1955

- Former borough constituency for the House of Commons
- County: West Riding of Yorkshire

1950–1955
- Created from: Sheffield Brightside, Sheffield Central and Sheffield Hillsborough
- Replaced by: Sheffield Brightside and Sheffield Hillsborough

Sheffield Neepsend was a short-lived Parliamentary constituency in the City of Sheffield, England. The constituency was created in 1950 and abolished in 1955, presumably due to its low number of electors - never exceeding 50,000. It was one of the safest Labour Party seats, and this was why its first MP, Harry Morris, agreed to step down in order that Government Minister Frank Soskice could gain a seat in the Commons in the 1950 by-election.

== Boundaries ==
The County Borough of Sheffield wards of Burngreave, Neepsend, St Peter's, and St Phillip's.

== Members of Parliament ==
Election	Member	Party
1950	Harry Morris	Labour
1950 by-election	Frank Soskice	Labour
1951	Frank Soskice	Labour
1955	constituency abolished	

== Election results ==
=== Elections in the 1950s ===
General election 1950: Sheffield Neepsend
Party	Candidate	Votes	%	±%
Labour	Harry Morris	30,317	72.8	
National Liberal	A. M. Cook	11,311	27.2	
Majority		19.006	45.6	
Turnout		41,638	83.8	
Labour win (new seat)				

1950 Sheffield Neepsend by-election: Sheffield Neepsend
Party	Candidate	Votes	%	±%
Labour	Frank Soskice	22,080	70.8	−2.0
Conservative	John Philip Hunt	8,365	26.8	−0.4
Communist	Bill Moore	729	2.4	New
Majority		13,715	44.0	−1.6
Turnout		31,174	55.1	−28.7
Labour hold		Swing	−0.8	

General election 1951: Sheffield Neepsend
Party	Candidate	Votes	%	±%
Labour	Frank Soskice	28,880	73.1	+0.3
National Liberal	Arthur Stobbs	10,655	26.9	−0.3
Majority		18,225	46.2	+0.6
Turnout		39,535	79.5	−4.3
Labour hold		Swing	+0.3	

== Sources ==
- Leigh Rayment's Historical List of MPs – Constituencies beginning with "N" (part 1)
- Richard Kimber's Political Science Resources (1951 election results)
- British Parliamentary By Elections
- Sheffield General Election Results 1945 - 2001, Sheffield City Council
