= Olivia Rossetti Agresti =

British activist and writer (1875–1960)

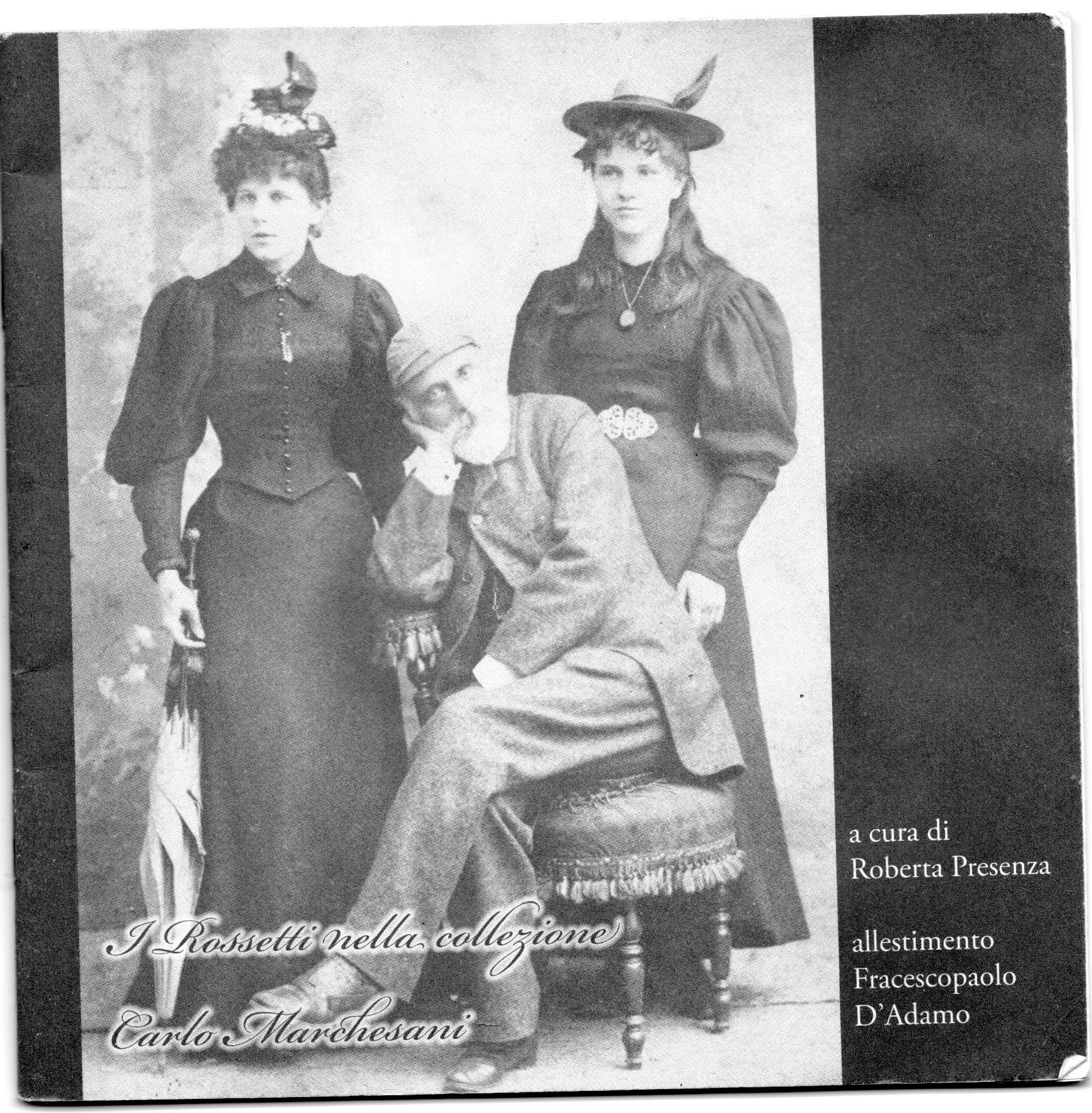
- Sisters Olivia (left) and Helen (right), with their father William Michael Rossetti
- Born: 20 September 1875
- Died: 1960 (aged 84–85)
- Parents: William Michael Rossetti (father); Lucy Madox Brown (mother)
- Relatives: Helen Rossetti Angeli (sister); Dante Gabriel Rossetti (uncle); Maria Francesca Rossetti (aunt); Christina Georgina Rossetti (aunt); Catherine Madox Brown (aunt); Ford Madox Brown (grandfather)

Olivia Rossetti Agresti (20 September 1875–1960) was a British activist, author, editor, and interpreter. A member of one of England's most prominent artistic and literary families, her unconventional political trajectory began with anarchism, continued with the League of Nations, and ended with Italian Fascism.

== Personal life ==
Olivia Frances Madox Rossetti was born on 20 September 1875 to William Michael Rossetti and Lucy Madox Brown. Lucy's father, Ford Madox Brown, painted Lucy and Olivia in 1876.

A member of one of England's most prominent artistic and literary families, her unconventional political trajectory began with anarchism, continued with the League of Nations, and ended with Italian Fascism. Her involvement with the latter led to an important correspondence and friendship with Ezra Pound, who mentions her twice in The Cantos.

== Publishing ==
While still in their girlhood, Olivia and her sister, the future Helen Rossetti Angeli (1879–1969), began publishing an anarchist journal, The Torch. Years later, using the pseudonym "Isabel Meredith", Olivia and Helen published A Girl Among the Anarchists, a somewhat fictionalized memoir of their days as precocious child revolutionaries.

== Selected works ==
- 1903. A Girl Among the Anarchists (co-authored with her sister Helen under the pseudonym "Isabel Meredith"). London: Duckworth Press.edition Internet Archive
- 1904. Giovanni Costa: His Life, Work, and Times. London: Grant Richards.
- 1920. "LEAGUE OF AGRICULTURE; How Institute David Lubin Founded Will Supplement Greater League of Nations", New York Times, 23 May, Page XX16
- 1922. David Lubin: A Study in Practical Idealism. Boston: Little, Brown and Company. 2nd edition, Berkeley and Los Angeles: University of California Press, 1941.
- 1938. The Organization of the Arts and Professions in the Fascist Guild State (co-authored with Mario Missiroli). Rome: Laboremus

== Sources ==
- Baigorri-Jalón, Jesús (2006). "Anecdotage of an Interpreter: Olivia Rossetti Agresti (1875–1960)". Pliegos de Yuste. 4, 1.
- Ford, Ford Madox (1932). Return to Yesterday. New York: Liveright.
- Pound, Ezra; Agresti, Olivia Rossetti; Tryphonopoulos, Demetres P.; Surette, Leon (1998). "I cease not to yowl": Ezra Pound's letters to Olivia Rossetti Agresti. Urbana: University of Illinois Press. ISBN 0-252-02410-9.
- Varè, Daniele (1949). The Two Imposters. London: John Murray.
