= Alexander Kaufmann =

German poet and folklorist

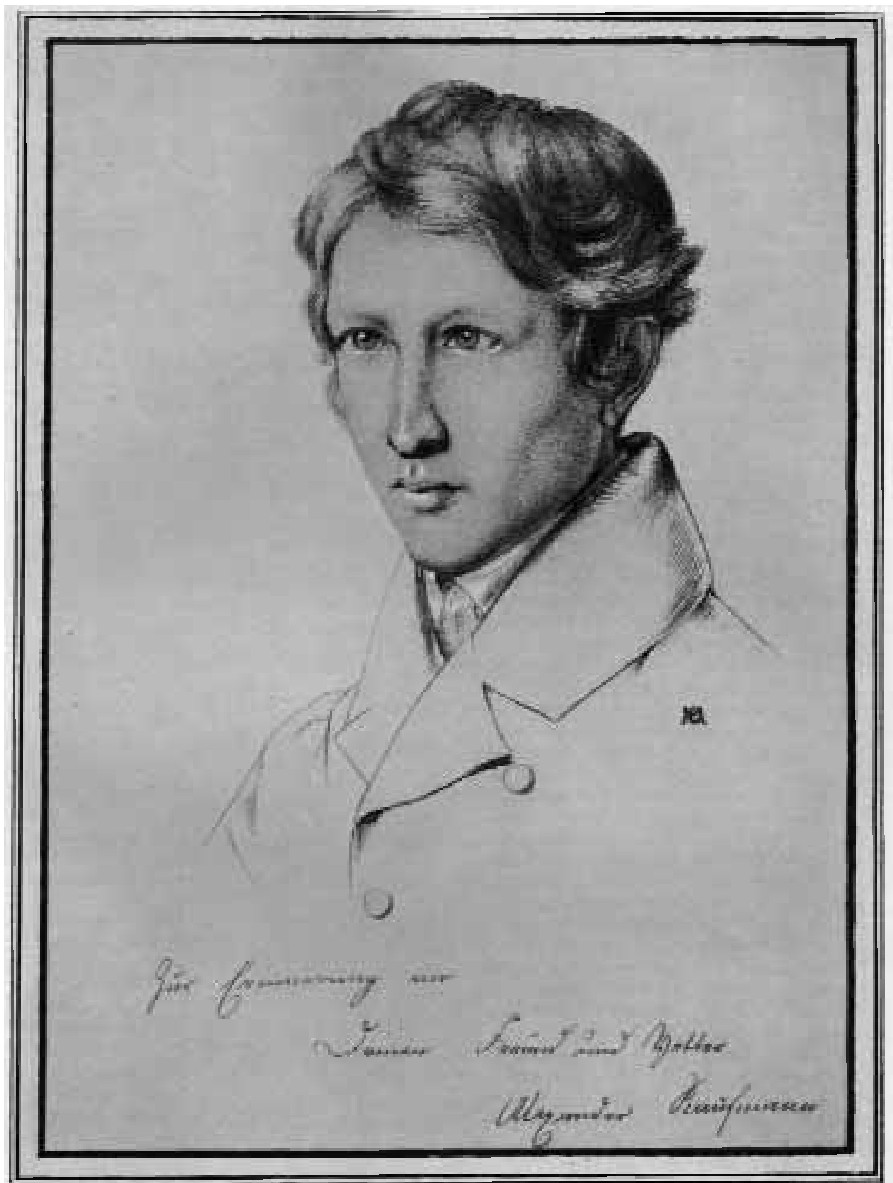
Alexander Kaufmann.

Alexander Kaufmann (14 May 1817 – 1 May 1893) was a German poet and folklorist from Bonn.

== Biography ==
Kaufmann came from a prominent local family, whose members had served in both the city government and service of the former Elector of Cologne. He was also related to the painter Andreas Müller.

At the University of Bonn, he studied law, languages, and history. In 1844, Kaufmann was appointed to teach Prince Karl von Löwenstein-Wertheim-Rosenberg, who made him keeper of the Wertheim archives in 1850. Kaufmann would retain this post until his death.

== Works ==
=== Poetry collections ===
- Gedichte (1852)
- Mainsagen (1853)
- Unter den Reben (1871)

=== Research and folklore ===
- Research for Karl Simrock's Legends of the Rhine
- Collected local legends of the Main
- Mythoterpe, ein Mythen-, Sagen- und Legendenbuch with poet Georg Friedrich Daumer;
- Researched information for Cæsarius von Heisterbach
- Translated Wunderbare Geschichten aus den Werken des Cæsarius von Heisterbach
- Biographie des belgischen Dominikaners Thomas von Chantimpre (posthumous)
