= Thomas Seddon =

English landscape painter (1821–1856)

For the New Zealand politician see Tom Seddon

Thomas Seddon (28 August 1821 in London – 23 November 1856 in Cairo) was an English landscape painter associated with the Pre-Raphaelite movement, who painted colourful and highly detailed scenes of Brittany, Egypt, and Jerusalem.

== Life ==
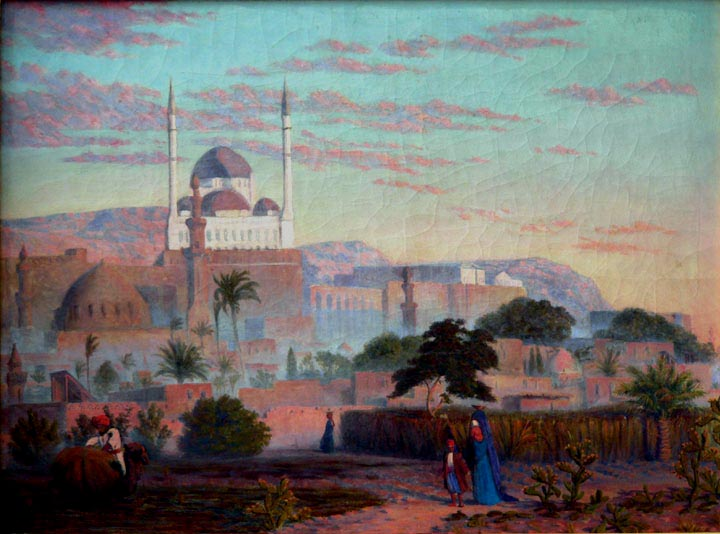
The Citadel of Cairo, 1856

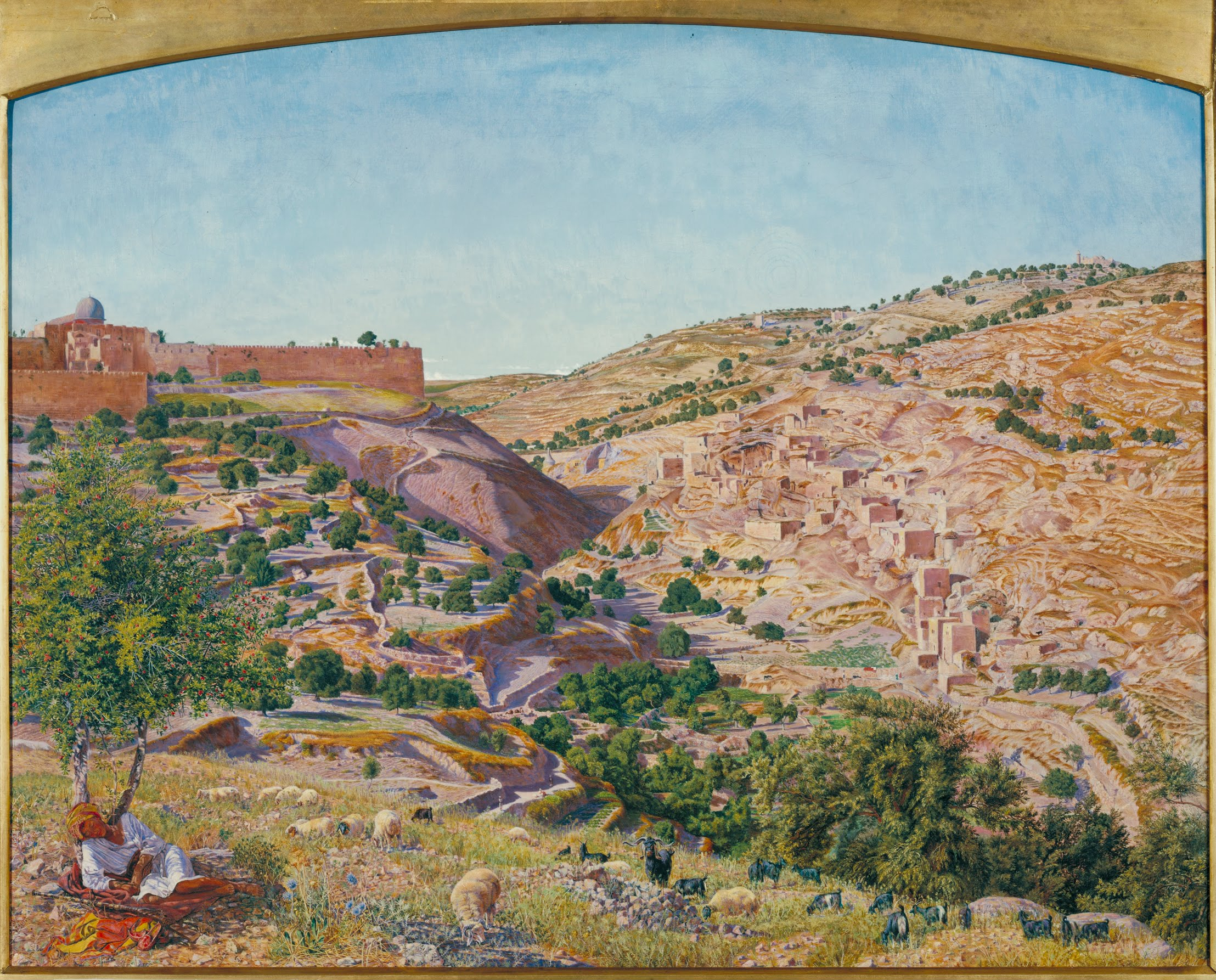
Jerusalem and the Valley of Jehoshaphat from the Hill of Evil Counsel, 1854. (Tate Gallery)

Seddon was born on 28 August 1821 in Aldersgate Street in the City of London, the son of a well-known cabinet-maker of the same name. He was educated at a school conducted on the Pestalozzian system by the Rev. Joseph Barron at Stanmore, and then worked for his father until 1841, when he was sent to Paris to study ornamental art.

He then returned to work in the family business. Although Seddon had already decided to become a painter, he continued to study design conscientiously, attending Thomas Leverton Donaldson's lectures on architecture and studying works in the British Museum. In 1848 his design for an ornamental sideboard won him a silver medal from the Society of Arts. Meanwhile, he took lessons at Charles Lucy's drawing school in Camden Town, and attended life classes held by the Artists' Society at Clipstone Street. In the summer of 1849, he went to North Wales, visiting Betws-y-Coed, then a popular destination for artists, where he made his first serious attempts at landscape painting. The next year he went to Barbizon in the forest of Fontainbleau, where he made some studies in oil.

By the beginning of 1848, Seddon had come into contact with the Pre-Raphaelite movement, having met Ford Madox Brown, and during 1850 he worked on a copy of Chaucer at the Court of Edward III in Brown's studio. Around this time he was also involved in the setting up of the North London School of Drawing and Modelling, an art school for working men in Camden Town. At the end of 1850 he suffered a severe attack of rheumatic fever, during which—apparently close to death—he was reconciled with organised religion, having stopped attending church some years before; according to his brother's memoir "those that knew him best regard[ed] that sickness as the turning point in his spiritual history, and the commencement of his practical Christianity." Just after this illness, Seddon left his father's business, which was about to be relocated to Gray's Inn Road. He moved to rooms in Percy Street, off Tottenham Court Road, where he completed a painting of figure subject, Penelope, which was his first work to be shown at the Royal Academy. He visited Wales again in late 1851 and the following summer went to Dinan in Brittany where his sisters were staying; a landscape painted there was shown at the Royal Academy the next year.

Seddon spent much of the early part of 1853 preparing for a journey to Egypt in the company of one of the Brotherhood's founders, William Holman Hunt. In June he went to Dinan again, where he painted a large and elaborate landscape showing the ruined monastery of Léhon. Seddon left France for Egypt in November, arriving in Alexandria on 6 December, and moved on to Cairo, Hunt not having yet arrived.

Seddon and Hunt set up camp near the Pyramids, with another Englishman called Nicholson, who was terminally ill, and died there. Then, in a change of plan, the two artists decided to move on to Jerusalem, sailing from the mouth of the Nile in late May. On arrival Seddon left Hunt in the city, and pitched a tent on a hill looking up the valley of Jehosophat, with a view of the biblical sites of the Garden of Gethsemane and the Mount of Olives, from where he painted much of the highly finished landscape Jerusalem and the Valley of Jehoshaphat from the Hill of Evil Counsel. He left the city for France in October 1854.

Although the Valley of Jehosphat was exhibited with the subtitle Painted on the Spot during the Summer and Autumn Months, Seddon continued to work on it in Dinan, along with another oil painting and two watercolours also begun in Jerusalem,. He finally finished it, with some help from Hunt, following his return to London in January 1855 and showed it for the first time at an exhibition in his studio in Berners Street in March of the same year. His Eastern subjects were exhibited again the following year in Conduit Street.

In October 1856 Seddon visited Cairo again, but died of dysentery there on 23 November. In 1857 his works were exhibited in the gallery of the Society of Arts, and Jerusalem and the Valley of Jehoshaphat, was purchased by subscription and presented to the National Gallery. John Ruskin pronounced Seddon's views of Egypt and Palestine to be "the first landscapes uniting perfect artistical skill with topographical accuracy; being directed, with stern self-restraint, to no other purpose than that of giving to persons who cannot travel trustworthy knowledge of the scenes which ought to be most interesting to them".

A memoir of Seddon, by his brother, architect John Pollard Seddon, was published in 1859.

== See also ==
- List of Pre-Raphaelite paintings - including the works of Thomas Seddon.

== Sources ==
- Seddon, John Pollard (1858). Memoir and Letters of the late Thomas Seddon, Artist. London: James Nisbet.
- Staley, Allen & Newall, Christopher (2004). Pre-Raphaelite Vision:Truth to Nature. London: The Tate Gallery.
