= Lucy Madox Brown =

British artist, author and model

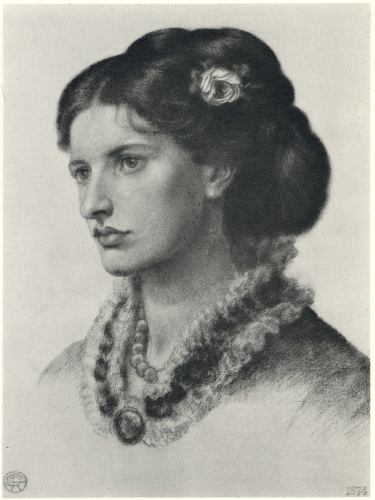
- 1874 portrait by Dante Gabriel Rossetti
- Born: Lucy Madox Brown; 19 July 1843; Paris, France
- Died: 12 April 1894 (aged 50); Sanremo, Italy
- Movement: Pre-Raphaelite Brotherhood; Aesthetic Movement; Arts and Crafts Movement
- Spouse: William Michael Rossetti (m. 1874)
- Children: 5, including Olivia
- Father: Ford Madox Brown
- Relatives: Catherine Madox Brown (half-sister)

Lucy Madox Brown Rossetti (19 July 1843 – 12 April 1894) was a British artist, author, and model associated with the Pre-Raphaelites. She was married to the writer and art critic William Michael Rossetti.

== Early life ==
Madox Brown was born in Paris in 1843, the daughter of Ford Madox Brown and Elizabeth Bromley (1819–1846). Her mother died just three years later in 1846, and she was sent to live with her aunt Helen Bromley in Gravesend, Kent. In 1856 she went to live with the Rossetti household in London and was tutored by her future sister-in-law, Maria Francesca Rossetti. She visited the Manchester Art Treasures Exhibition in 1857. Her half-sister Catherine Madox Brown described her as "a strange mixture with a violent temper and a strong brain."

== Marriage and family ==
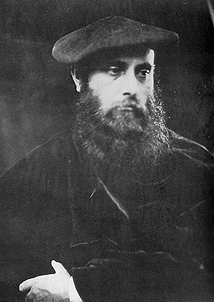
William Michael Rossetti, by Julia Margaret Cameron

In the summer of 1873 she became engaged to William Michael Rossetti, and they married on 31 March 1874. William was the son of Gabriele Rossetti and his wife Frances Polidori. His siblings were: Maria, Dante Gabriel and Christina. They honeymooned in France and Naples, Italy, in April 1874. They attempted to live with William's family but, due to religious differences with Frances and Christina, who were devout Anglo-Catholics, moved out to their own accommodation in Bloomsbury by the end of 1876.

Their first child, Olivia Frances Madox, was born in September 1875, and their son, Gabriel Arthur, was born in February 1877, followed by Helen Maria, in November 1879, and twins, Mary Elizabeth and Michael Ford, in April 1881. Michael died in infancy. Lucy and Wiliam, who both were agnostics, did not have their children baptized. The children were educated at home by their mother and governesses.

In 1897, Olivia married an Italian anarchist refugee, Antonio Agresti. They later moved to Italy, where Olivia became a translator and writer. After she was widowed in 1926, she became an associate of Ezra Pound, and the two corresponded frequently. Gabriel Arthur, known as Arthur to the family, became a scientist, married Dora Lewis, and had several children. Helen became a painter of miniatures, and in 1903 married Gastone Angeli. He was in fragile health and died only a few months later. Helen gave birth to his posthumous daughter, Imogen Lucy, in 1904.

== Artistic and literary career ==
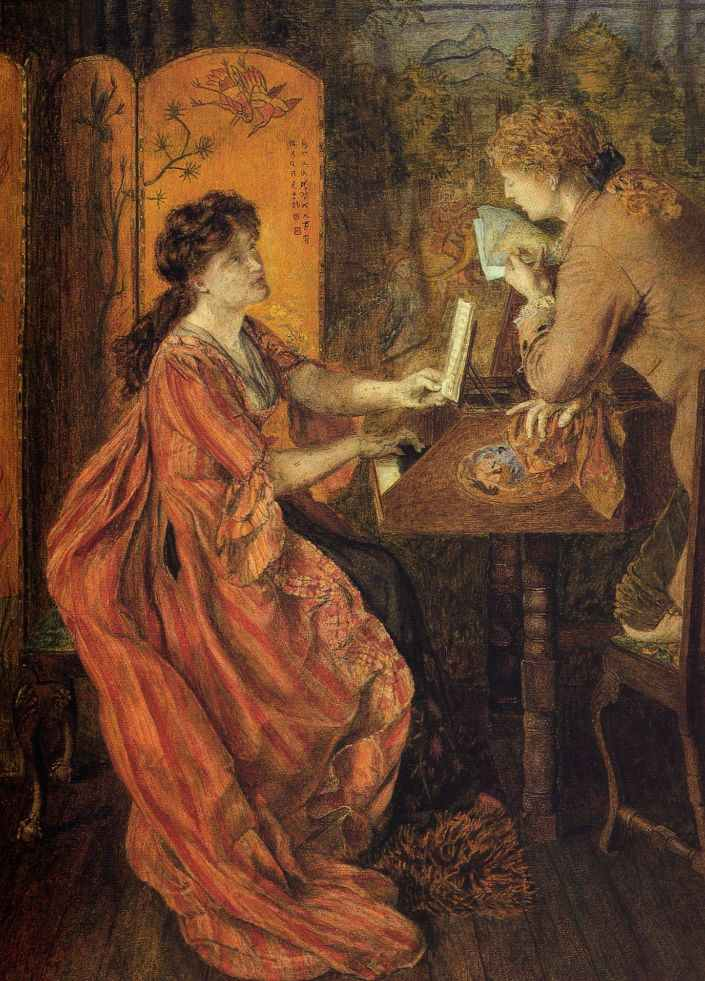
The Duet by Lucy Madox Brown (1870)

She began painting in 1868, and along with her half sister Catherine, modelled and worked as an assistant under their father. Other female Pre-Raphaelite artists such as Georgiana Burne-Jones, the sister of Thomas Seddon and Marie Spartali Stillman also took lessons in the same studio. Working mainly in watercolours, she exhibited in Dudley Museum and Art Gallery from 1869 to 1872. Her painting, The Duet, which was exhibited at the Royal Academy in 1870, was described by Dante Gabriel Rossetti as a "perfect picture". She stopped painting in 1874.

She wrote the biography of Mary Shelley, Mrs. Shelley, for John Ingram's Eminent Women series and it was published in 1890.

== Death ==
From 1885 she suffered from consumption and went to Italy for her health during the winter. The illness worsened Lucy's temper and brought the permanent rift between her and William. Rossetti was deeply affected by Lucy's alienation: "This change in my relations of affection and home-life is about the most painful thing that could have occurred to me." She died on 12 April 1894 at the Hotel Victoria in Sanremo, Italy, in the presence of her husband and her daughter Olivia, and was buried in La Foce Cemetery. Lucy's will left everything to her children, which Dinah Roe suggests was intended to protect them in the event William remarried in the future.

== List of works ==
- The Duet, 1870. Exh. RA.
- Romeo and Juliet, 1870, Wightwick Manor, Wolverhampton, UK.
- Study for Romeo and Juliet, 28 x 33.6 cm, chalk on paper, sold Christie's, London, 28 November 2000, lot 26.
- The Tempest, c. 1870, oil on canvas, private collection.
- Après le Bal, 1870, watercolour, private collection.
- The Magic Mirror, 1872, private collection.
- Margaret Roper Receiving the Head of her Father 1873, oil on canvas, St Thomas More, Burford.

== Work and portraits ==
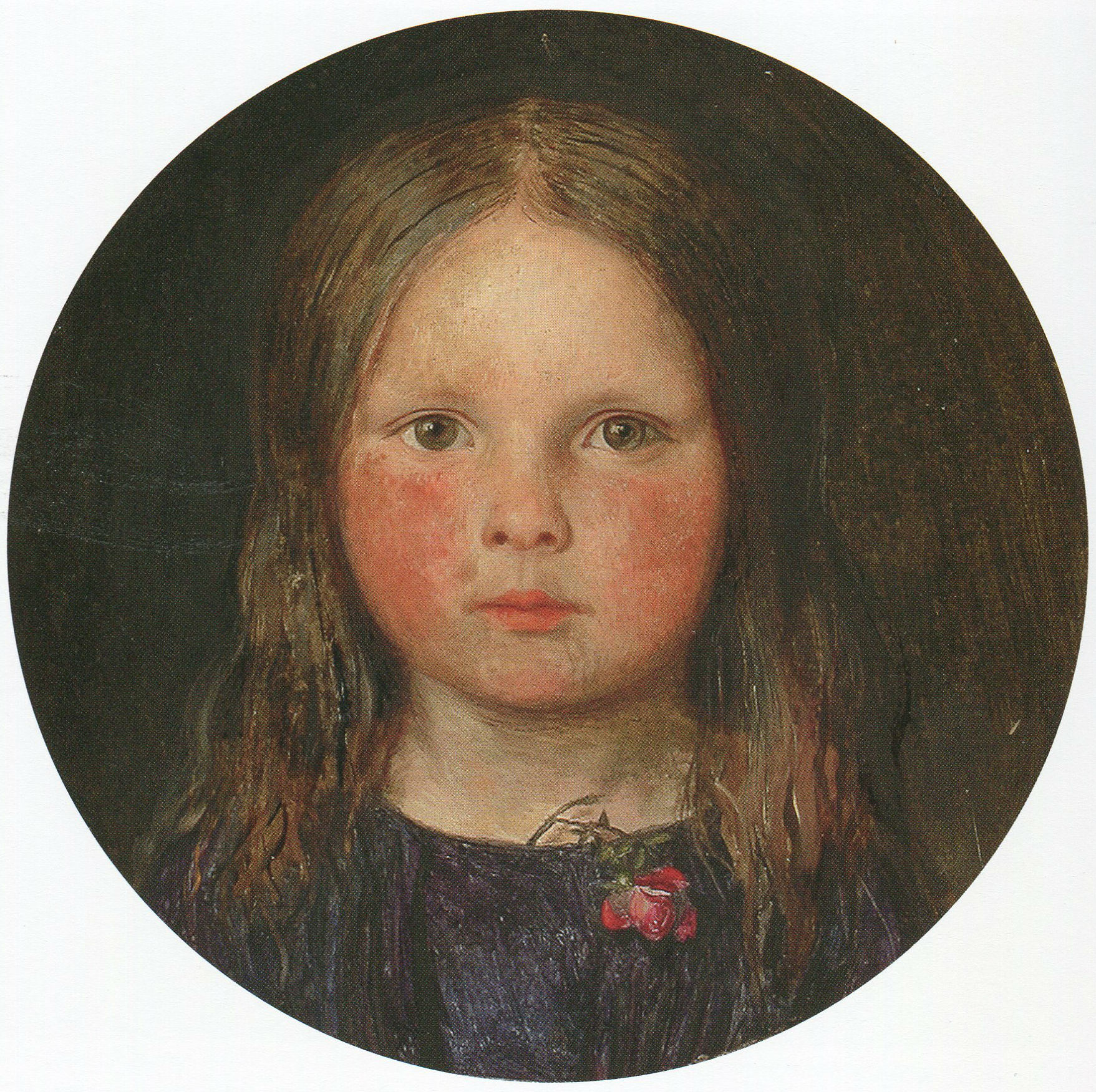
Portrait of Lucy Madox Brown by her father, Ford Madox Brown

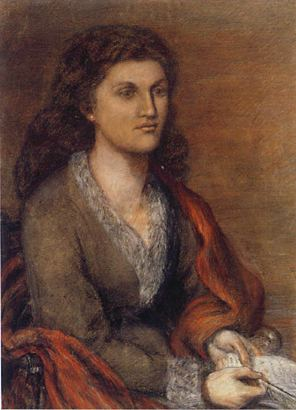
Mathilde Blind by Lucy Madox Brown

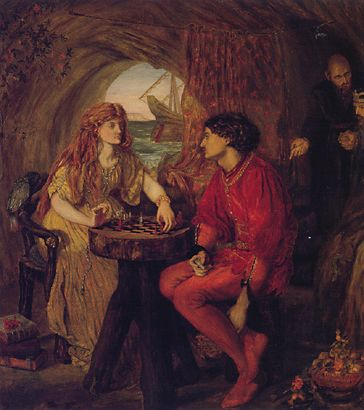
The Tempest by Lucy Madox Brown

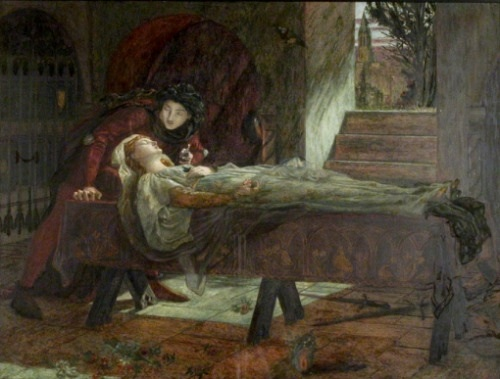
Romeo and Juliet, the tomb scene

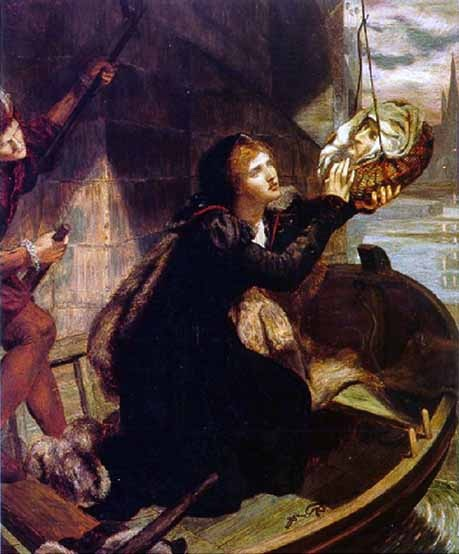
Margaret Roper

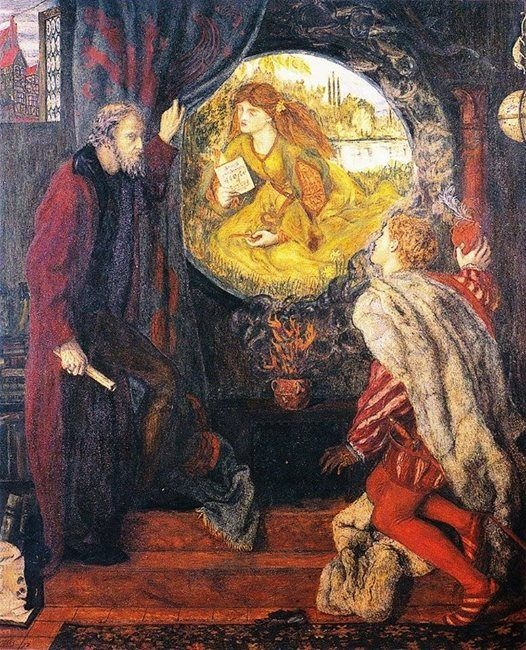
Magic Mirror

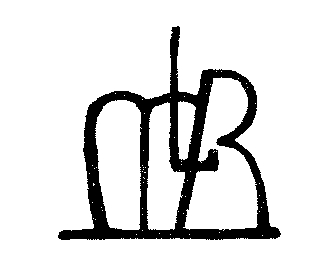
Signature of Lucy Madox Brown
- Reproduction of Portrait by Dante Gabriel Rossetti at the Rossetti Archive.
- Portrait by Dante Gabriel Rossetti at Wightwick Manor, West Midlands.

== Exhibitions ==
'Uncommon Power': Lucy and Catherine Madox Brown at the Watts Gallery 28 September 2021 – 20 February 2022.
