= Rossettis =

The Rossettis were a culturally influential Italo-British family. They included -

- Gabriele Rossetti (1783--1854), political exile

His children:

- Maria Francesca Rossetti (1827--1876), author.
- Dante Gabriel Rossetti (1828–-1882), poet, illustrator, painter, translator.
- William Michael Rossetti (1829-–1919), writer, critic.
- Christina Rossetti (1830-–1894), poet.
