= John William Polidori =

English writer and physician (1795-1821)

John Polidori
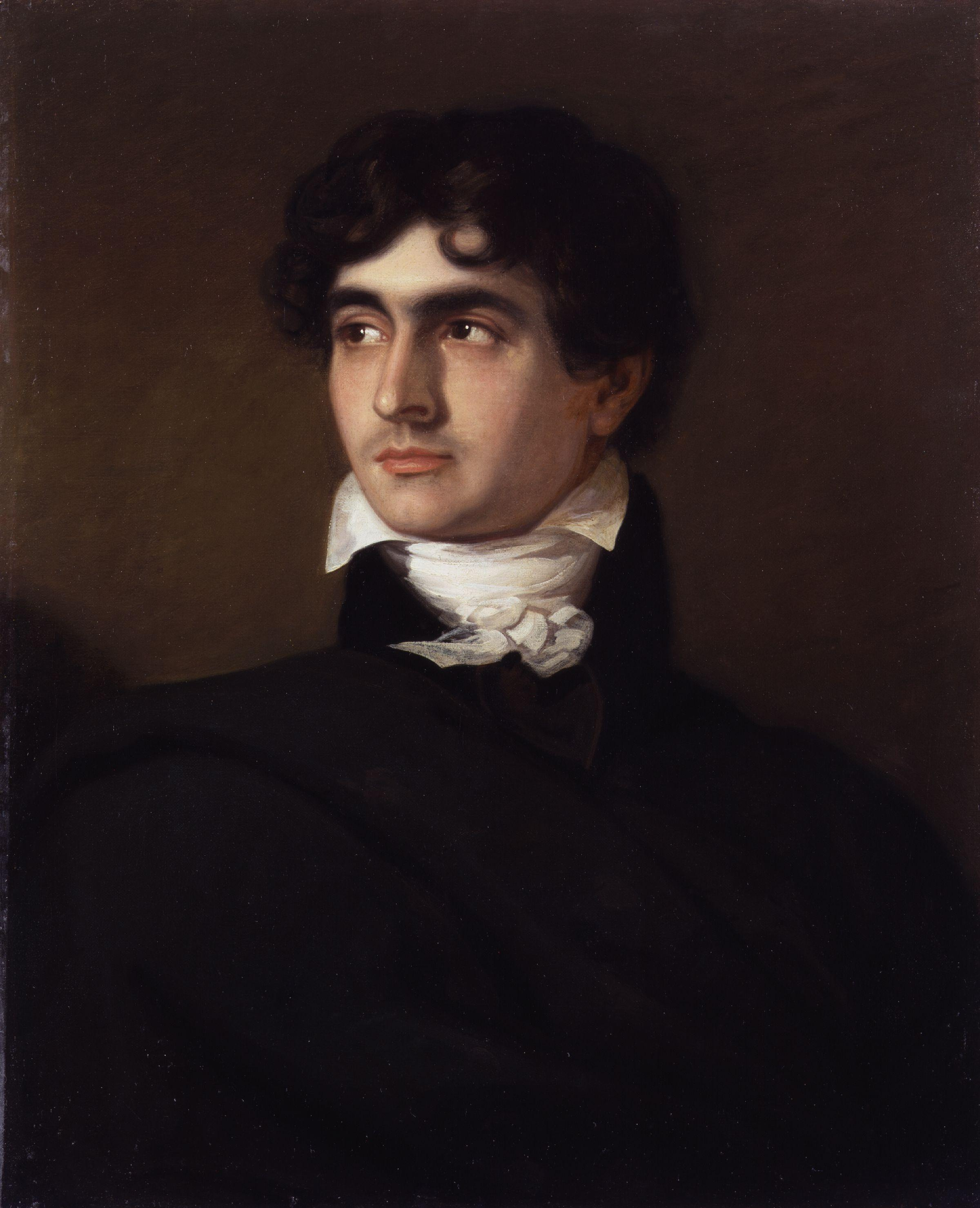
- Portrait by F. G. Gainsford
- Born: 7 September 1795; Westminster, England
- Died: 24 August 1821 (aged 25); St Pancras, London, England
- Education: University of Edinburgh
- Occupations: Writer; Physician
- Parent(s): Gaetano Polidori; Anna Maria Pierce
- Relatives: Frances Polidori (sister)
- Writing career
- Genres: Vampire; horror

John William Polidori (7 September 1795 – 24 August 1821) was an English writer and medical doctor. He is known for his associations with the Romantic movement and credited by some as the creator of the vampire genre of fantasy fiction.

His most successful work was the short The Vampyre (1819), the first published modern vampire story. Although the story was at first erroneously credited to Lord Byron, both Byron and Polidori affirmed that the author was Polidori.

== Family ==
John William Polidori was born on 7 September 1795 in Westminster, the eldest son of Gaetano Polidori, an Italian political émigré scholar of Greek descent, and his wife Anna Maria Pierce, an English governess. He had three brothers and four sisters.

His sister Frances Polidori married the exiled Italian scholar Gabriele Rossetti, and thus Polidori, posthumously, became the uncle of Maria Francesca Rossetti, Dante Gabriel Rossetti, William Michael Rossetti, and Christina Georgina Rossetti. William Michael Rossetti published Polidori's journal in 1911.

== Education ==
John Polidori was one of the earliest pupils at the recently established Ampleforth College in North Yorkshire from 1804. In 1810 he went up to the University of Edinburgh, where he wrote a thesis on sleepwalking and received his degree as a doctor of medicine on 1 August 1815, at the age of 19.

== Working for Lord Byron ==
In 1816, which became known as the Year Without a Summer, Polidori entered Lord Byron's service as his personal physician and accompanied him on a trip through Europe. Publisher John Murray offered Polidori 500 English pounds to keep a diary of their travels, which Polidori's nephew William Michael Rossetti later edited. At the Villa Diodati, a house Byron rented by Lake Geneva in Switzerland, the pair met with Mary Wollstonecraft Godwin, her husband-to-be, Percy Bysshe Shelley, and their companion (Mary's stepsister) Claire Clairmont.

One night in June after the company had read aloud from Fantasmagoriana, a French collection of German horror tales, Byron suggested they each write a ghost story. Percy Bysshe Shelley wrote "A Fragment of a Ghost Story" and wrote down five ghost stories recounted by Matthew Gregory "Monk" Lewis, published posthumously as the Journal at Geneva (including ghost stories) and on Return to England, 1816, the journal entries beginning on 18 August 1816. Mary Shelley worked on a tale that would later evolve into Frankenstein. Byron wrote (and quickly abandoned) a fragment of a story, A Fragment featuring the main character Augustus Darvell, which Polidori used later as the basis for his own tale, The Vampyre the first published modern vampire story in English.

Polidori's conversation with Percy Bysshe Shelley on 15 June 1816, as recounted in The Diary, is regarded as the origin or genesis of Frankenstein. They discussed "the nature of the principle of life": "June 15 - ... Shelley etc. came in the evening ... Afterwards, Shelley and I had a conversation about principles — whether man was to be thought merely an instrument."

Dismissed by Byron, Polidori travelled in Italy and then returned to England. Whilst in London he lived on Great Pulteney Street in Soho.

== Publications ==
His story, The Vampyre which featured the main character Lord Ruthven, was published in the April 1819 issue of New Monthly Magazine without his permission. Much to both his and Byron's chagrin, The Vampyre was released as a new work by Byron. Byron's own vampire story Fragment of a Novel or A Fragment was published in 1819 in an attempt to clear up the confusion, but, for better or worse, The Vampyre continued to be attributed to him.

Polidori's long, Byron-influenced theological poem The Fall of the Angels was published anonymously in 1821.

== Poem by Byron ==
Epistle From Mr. Murray to Dr. Polidori is a satirical poem by Byron written in response to a request from John Murray (publisher, born 1778) for a 'delicate declension' (a polite rejection) of Polidori's tragedy, believed to be his drama Cajetan or Ximenes.

== Death ==
John Polidori died at his father's London house on 24 August 1821, weighed down by depression and gambling debts. Despite conjecture from his family that he died by suicide by means of prussic acid, the coroner gave a verdict of death by natural causes.

== Works ==
=== Plays ===
- Cajetan, a play (1816)
- Boadicea, a play (1816)

=== Poems ===
- Ximenes, the Wreath and Other Poems (1819)
- The Fall of the Angels: A Sacred Poem (1821)

=== Novellas ===
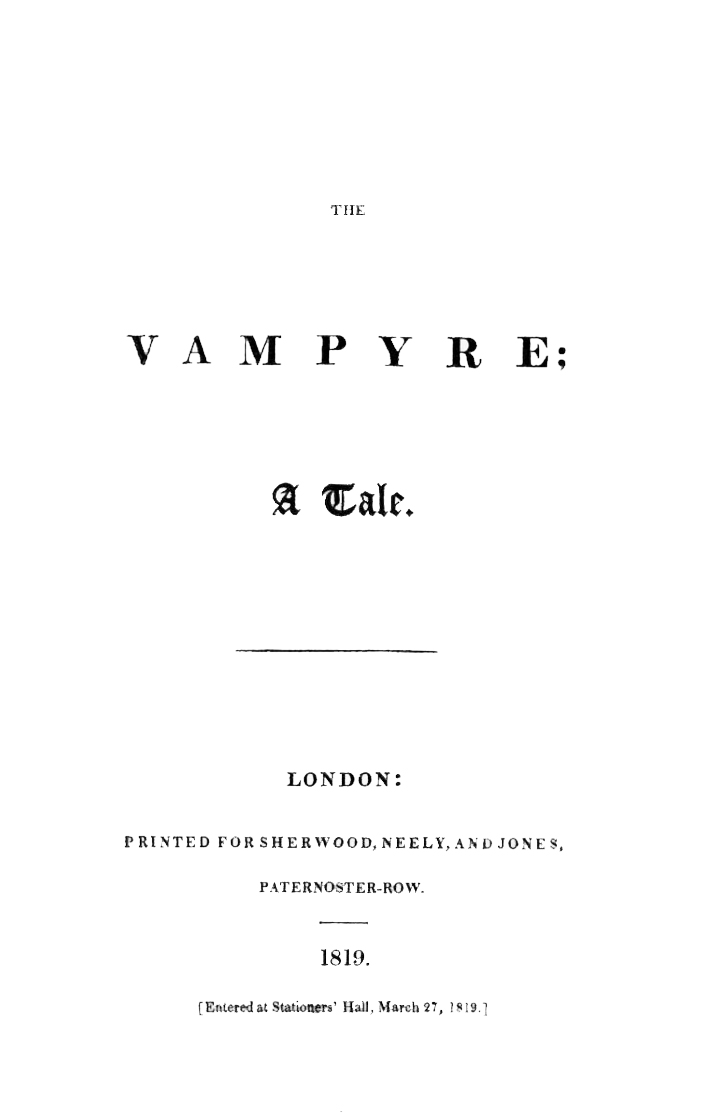
The Vampyre; A Tale, 1819.

- The Vampyre: A Tale (1819)
- Ernestus Berchtold; or, The Modern Oedipus: A Tale (1819)

=== Non-fiction ===
- A Medical Inaugural Dissertation which deals with the disease called Oneirodynia, for the degree of Medical Doctor, Edinburgh (1815)
- The Diary of Dr. John William Polidori (1816, published posthumously in 1911)
- On the Punishment of Death (1816)
- An Essay Upon the Source of Positive Pleasure (1818)
- Sketches Illustrative of the Manners and Costumes of France, Switzerland and Italy (1821)

== Posthumous editions ==
His sister Charlotte transcribed Polidori's diaries, but censored "peccant passages" and destroyed the original. Based only on the transcription, The Diary of John Polidori was edited by William Michael Rossetti and first published in 1911 by Elkin Mathews (London). Reprints of this book, The Diary of Dr. John William Polidori, 1816, relating to Byron, Shelley, etc., was published by Folcroft Library Editions (Folcroft, PA) in 1975, and by Norwood Editions (Norwood, PA) in 1978. A new edition of The Diary of John William Polidori was reprinted by Cornell University in 2009.

== Legacy ==
=== Memorials ===
A memorial plaque on John Polidori's home at 38 Great Pulteney Street was unveiled on 15 July 1998 by the Italian Ambassador, Paolo Galli.

=== Appearances in other media ===
==== Film ====
Multiple films have depicted John Polidori, and the genesis of the Frankenstein and "Vampyre" stories in 1816:

- Gothic (1986), directed by Ken Russell, with Timothy Spall as Polidori
- Haunted Summer (1988), directed by Ivan Passer, with Alex Winter as Polidori
- Remando al viento (1988; English title: Rowing with the Wind) directed by Gonzalo Suárez
- Mary Shelley (2017), directed by Haifaa Al-Mansour

Additionally, Polidori's name was used for fictional characters in the following films:

- Frankenstein: The True Story (1973), a television movie featuring a character named Dr. Polidori
- Vampires vs. the Bronx (2020), a film featuring a character named Frank Polidori

==== Literature ====
- Polidori appears as one of several minor characters killed off by Frankenstein's creature in Peter Ackroyd's novel The Casebook of Victor Frankenstein.
- Polidori is a central character in Federico Andahazi's novel The Merciful Women (Las Piadosas in the original Argentine edition). In it, he receives The Vampyre written by the fictional character of Annette Legrand, in exchange for some "favours".
- Polidori appears as a character in Howard Brenton's play Bloody Poetry (though for some reason Brenton calls him William.)
- Polidori is a prominent character and the catalyst in events in Brooklyn Ann's historical paranormal romance novel, Bite Me, Your Grace.
- Polidori is a central character in Emmanuel Carrère's 1984 novel Gothic Romance (Bravoure in the original French edition), which, amongst other things, presents a fictionalised account of the events of 1816.
- Polidori appears as a character in Susanna Clarke's novel Jonathan Strange & Mr Norrell.
- Polidori appears as an enemy of Lord Byron (who is a vampire) in Tom Holland's novel Lord of the Dead.
- Polidori is also the 'hero' of the novel Imposture (2007) by Benjamin Markovits.
- Polidori is also the central character in Derek Marlowe's novel A Single Summer With L. B., which presents an account (fictionalised) of the summer of 1816.
- Polidori appears as a minor and unsympathetic character in the Tim Powers' horror novel The Stress of Her Regard (1989), in which Polidori does not write about vampires but becomes directly involved with them. In Powers' sequel (of sorts), Hide Me Among the Graves (2012), Polidori is a vampire and a central villain menacing the novel's protagonists, his nieces and nephews in the Rossetti family.
- Paul West's novel Lord Byron's Doctor (1989) is a recreation, and ribald fictionalization, of Polidori's diaries. West depicts him as a literary groupie whose attempts to emulate Byron eventually unhinge and destroy him.
- (2013): Polidori is a prominent character in P.J. Parker's internationally acclaimed historic fiction Fire on the Water: A Companion to Mary Shelley's Frankenstein
- (2019): P.J. Parker's historic fiction Origin of the Vampyre pulls back the shroud of mystery surrounding the publication of Polidori's novel.
- (2011): In Ben Aaronovitch's Rivers of London and the other Peter Grant books, Polidori is often cited as a source of information about the supernatural.

==== Opera ====
- Polidori functions as narrator in John Mueter's one-act opera Everlasting Universe and has a speaking role in several scenes.

==== Musical Theatre ====
- In the musical Monsters of the Villa Diodati, Polidori is a featured character, along with Mary Shelley, Percy Shelley, Lord Byron, and Claire Claremont. The musical, written in 2014, was originally produced by Creative Cauldron at ArtSpace Falls Church in 2015. This atmospheric production reveals the origin story of two legendary Gothic monsters, John Polidori's The Vampyre and Mary Shelley's Frankenstein, while exploring their creators' own inner monsters.

==== Television ====
- In the Highlander: The Series episode "The Modern Prometheus", which featured Lord Byron, one of the series regulars, Methos, serves as a stand-in for Polidori. Methos, who was immortal, was Byron's mentor, friend, and physician, and experienced the same events as the real Polidori did on that (in)famous night.
- In the stop-motion animated series Mary Shelley's Frankenhole, Polidori is a regular character portrayed as the immortal lab assistant of Dr. Victor Frankenstein.
- Polidori was mentioned in the Tales from the Crypt episode "Ritual".
- Dr. John Polidori (portrayed by John O'Hurley) was the antagonist of the fifth season The X-Files episode, "The Post-Modern Prometheus".
- Polidori was also portrayed by Noah McLaughlin in the 2016 web series A Ungenial Summer, which fictionalized the events of the summer of 1816 in the modern day. In this version, Polidori serves as a personal assistant to Lord Byron, rather than physician.
- In the episode of CBBC children's television show Horrible Histories entitled Staggering Storytellers, Polidori was portrayed by Jalaal Hartley in the sketch about the original of his story, The Vampyre and Mary Shelley's (portrayed by Jessica Ransom) story Frankenstein while at Lord Byron's Villa Diodati in Switzerland.
- Polidori is portrayed by Maxim Baldry in the 2020 Doctor Who episode "The Haunting of Villa Diodati", which depicts him as a sleepwalker.

== Bibliography ==
- Polidori, John William (2009), Rossetti, William Michael (ed.), The Diary of Dr. John William Polidori, 1816, relating to Byron, Shelley, etc., Cornell, NY: Cornell University Library, ISBN 978-1-4297-9503-6.

== See also ==
- Rossetti–Polidori family tree

== Sources ==
- Nigel Leask, "Polidori, John William (1795–1821)", Oxford Dictionary of National Biography, Oxford University Press, 2004 Retrieved 30 April 2006.
- Rieger, James. "Dr. Polidori and the Genesis of Frankenstein." Studies in English Literature 3 (1963): 461–72. The origin of Frankenstein was in a conversation between John William Polidori and Percy Bysshe Shelley on 15 June 1816.
- Rossetti, William Michael, The Diary of Dr. John William Polidori, Elkin Matthews, 1911 Retrieved 2 October 2015.
- Stott, Andrew McConnell. "The Poet, the Physician and the Birth of the Modern Vampire", The Public Domain Review. Retrieved 7 August 2017.
- Stott, Andrew McConnell. The Poet and the Vampyre: The Curse of Byron and the Birth of Literature's Greatest Monsters. New York: Canongate/Pegasus, 2013.
