= Christie in Love =

Play by Howard Brenton

- Written by: Howard Brenton
- Characters: Christie; Constable; Inspector
- Original language: English
- Setting: A police station, 10 Rillington Place

Premiere
- Date premiered: 23 November 1969
- Place premiered: Oval House

Christie in Love is an early play by Howard Brenton concerning the life of serial killer John Christie, who murdered at least seven women between 1943 and 1953, after which he was caught, tried and hanged.

== Stage history ==
The play, Brenton's first for Portable Theatre, was directed by David Hare, designed by Tony Bicat and the stage management was by Snoo Wilson. Hare continued on as director when the play was presented at the Royal Court on 12 March 1970. John Russell Taylor reviewed the play favourably in The Second Wave, while Ronald Bryden in The Observer noted that "Brenton catches the peculiar cosy horror which surrounded our most sensational murder trial of the fifties". The play won Brenton the John Whiting Award for 1970.

There have been revivals of the play in 1972 (Liverpool Playhouse, starring Colin Baker); in 2003 starring Paul Dundee, Strath Martin and Paul Pirie [Dundee Rep]); and in 2008 (Edinburgh Fringe).

The play was revived in 2009 in a co-production between Thrill Seeker and Cheekish. It was performed at the Lion and Unicorn from 27 October to 22 November.

== Style ==
The author's production note to the play states that "It is written to be played very slowly" and should last nearly an hour. Portable Theatre was a touring company with limited resources and Christie in Love was written for these conditions. Brenton described plays like this as being for the poor theatre and written "to turn "bad theatrical conditions" to advantage".

== See also ==
- 10 Rillington Place – 1971 film which deals with the same subject
