= Josef Frank (politician) =

Czech politician and union member (1909–1952)

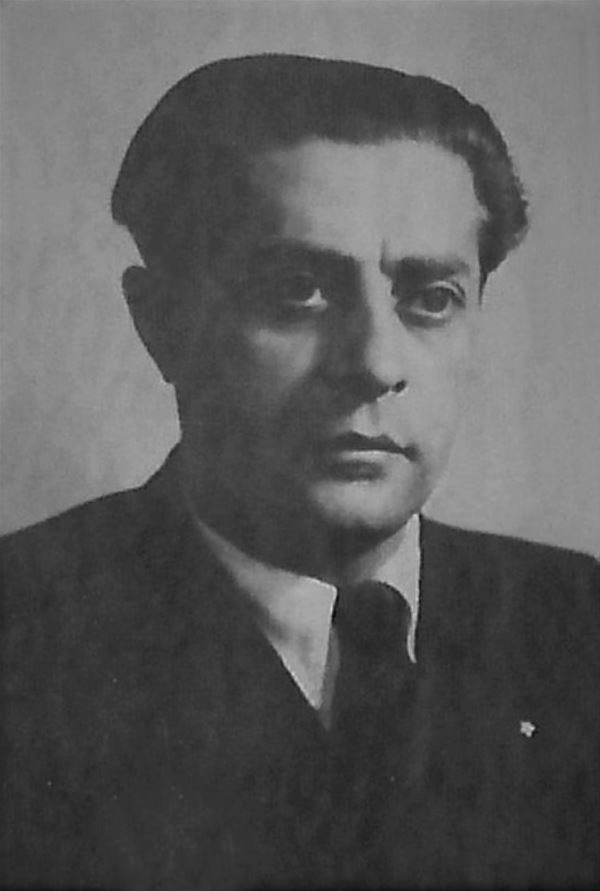
- Portrait of Frank from the MNB collection held at the Security Services Archive
- Born: 25 February 1909; Prostějov, Margraviate of Moravia, Austria-Hungary
- Died: 3 December 1952 (aged 43); Pankrác Prison, Prague, Czechoslovak Republic
- Cause of death: Judicial murder
- Years active: 1926–1952
- Era: 20th century
- Known for: Defendant in the Slánský trial
- Political party: Communist Party of Czechoslovakia
- Movement: Communism
- Criminal penalty: Death by hanging
- Awards: Hero of the Czechoslovak Socialist Republic

Josef Frank (25 February 1909, Prostějov – 3 December 1952, Prague) was a Czech communist politician.

== Biography ==
Between 1939 and 1945 he was imprisoned in Buchenwald concentration camp.

In 1952 he was expelled from the party. He was subsequently arrested and sentenced to death by hanging in the Slánský trial, a show trial orchestrated from Moscow. In 1968 he was made a Hero of the Czechoslovak Socialist Republic in memoriam.

Frank is the central character of Howard Brenton's 1976 play Weapons of Happiness, in which he is imagined not dead, but rather living in exile.
