= Greenland (1988 play) =

Play by Howard Brenton

- First edition Methuen, 1988
- Original language: English
- Written by: Howard Brenton

Premiere
- Date: 26 May 1988
- Place: Royal Court Theatre, London

Greenland is a 1988 play by Howard Brenton. It is a neo-Brechtian epic psychodrama with many actors, props and scene changes, on which the writer worked for seven years. It is the last of Brenton's three Utopian plays, following Sore Throats and Bloody Poetry.

Howard Brenton's Greenland is not to be confused with the 2011 play of the same name co-authored by Moira Buffini, Matt Charman, Penelope Skinner and Jack Thorne.

The play opened at the Royal Court Theatre in London on 26 May 1988 and played there for a season. Its United States premiere was at the Famous Door Theater in Chicago in January 1994.

== Plot summary ==
The first act is set on 11 June 1987, the day of the third consecutive Conservative general election victory. Four of the characters jump into the River Thames in despair, and in the second act wake up 700 years in the future, in a utopia where no one has to do anything they don't want to.

== Leading characters ==
The action centres around four characters: Joan, a Labour parliamentary candidate; Betty, a morally-outraged fundamentalist; Brian, a drunk; and Paul, Lord Ludlow, a wife-beating, debt-ridden capitalist.
