= Greenland (2011 play) =

2011 collaborative play

Greenland is a play by the British playwrights Moira Buffini, Penelope Skinner, Matt Charman and Jack Thorne on global warming and its effects, named after the island of Greenland. It premiered at the Lyttelton auditorium of the Royal National Theatre in London from 27 January to 2 April 2011, directed by Bijan Sheibani and with a cast including Lyndsey Marshal.

The play is not to be confused with the 1988 play of the same name by Howard Brenton.
