= Doctor Scroggy's War =

Doctor Scroggy's War is a 2014 play by Howard Brenton, commissioned by Shakespeare's Globe, where it premiered on 12 September 2014, marking the centenary of World War One. It is centred on the fictional soldier Jack Twigg and his involvement with Harold Gillies.

== Plot ==
Early in World War One, Gillies tries and fails to save the life of a British airman. Meanwhile, Jack Twigg goes to see his parents to tell them he has joined up, into the London Irish Rifles. His father (a working-class Thames waterman) has his doubts, since this will mean Twigg postponing his hard-won scholarship to Oxford University, but they eventually agree. He also introduces them to his friend Lord Ralph Dulwich, with whom he then goes to a party hosted by Sir John French. Impressing French, he is given a staff appointment which Dulwich had hoped to gain and the two friends fall out. Twigg also catches the eye of Penelope Wedgewood, with whom he spends the night and loses his virginity.

In France, Twigg is involved in the organisation of the Battle of Loos, though his advice to bring the reserves closer to the front line is ignored by French despite its being backed by Douglas Haig. Twigg leaves the staff and goes to the front-line, where he receives a facial injury. He is then sent to Gillies' hospital, where he begins to despair and wishes to be back at the front. This continues even when faced with Gillies' alter-ego Dr Scroggy - he goes around the wards dressed as a highland soldier to raise his patients' morale. Queen Mary comes to visit the hospital and Penelope, Ralph and Twigg reconcile. However, soon afterwards Penelope decides to become a pacifist and she and Twigg break up angrily. Gillies tries to convince him not to go back to the front, but is unable to do so. The play ends with Twigg back on the Western Front.
