= The Fall of the Angels =

The Fall of the Angels is a Miltonesque epic poem by John William Polidori concerned with the creation of the world.

It was published anonymously in 1821 only months before Polidori's death. The only known contemporary review of the poem was a negative one, published on 5 May 1821. After Polidori's death, a version of the poem with his name on the title page was published.
