= Gaetano Polidori =

Italian writer, political, and scholar

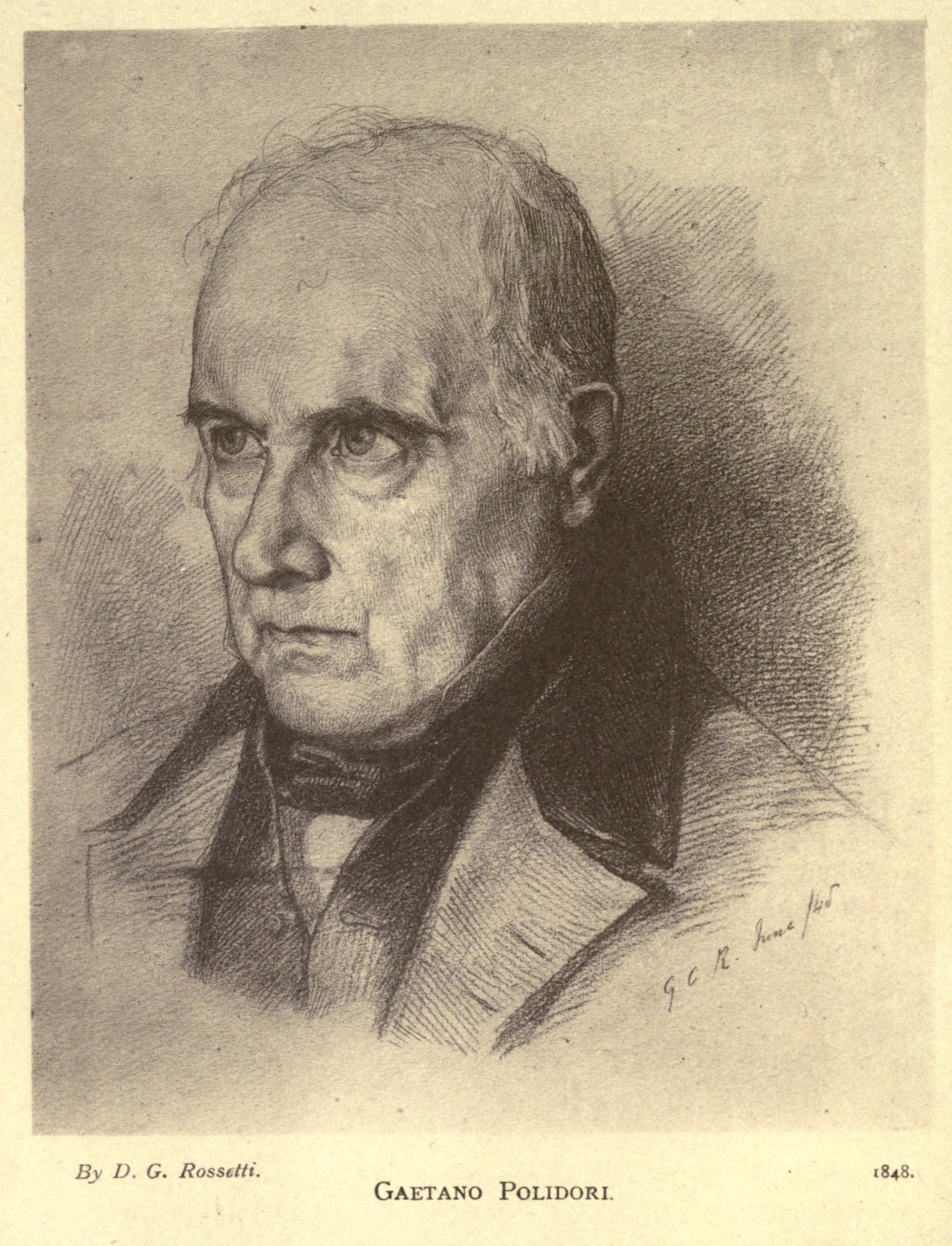
- 1848. G.Polidori by D.G.Rossetti
- Born: 5 August 1763; Bientina, Grand Duchy of Tuscany
- Died: 16 December 1853 (aged 90); Highgate, Middlesex, England
- Occupations: writer, publisher
- Spouse: Anna Maria Pierce (m. 1793)
- Children: 4, including John William and Frances

Gaetano Fedele Polidori (5 August 1763 – 16 December 1853) was an Italian writer and scholar of Greek descent, living in Highgate. He was the son of Agostino Ansano Polidori (1714–1778), a physician and poet who lived and practised in his native Bientina, near Pisa, Tuscany.

Polidori studied law at the University of Pisa. He became secretary to the tragedian Vittorio Alfieri in 1785 and remained with him four years.

He came to England from Paris in 1790 after resigning as Alfieri's secretary. He settled in Highgate, working as an Italian teacher and translator. He translated various literary works, notably, John Milton's Paradise Lost and Horace Walpole's The Castle of Otranto, besides other writings of Milton and Lucan. He wrote prolifically, producing his own fiction, poetry, criticism, and tragedies. He also set up a private press at his home, where amongst other works (mostly his own), he printed the first editions of some poems by his grandchildren, Dante Gabriel Rossetti and Christina Rossetti. He also printed an edition of the poem Osteologia, which his father Agostino Ansano Polidori had written in 1763.

He retired to a house in Holmer Green, Buckinghamshire in 1836.

== Family ==
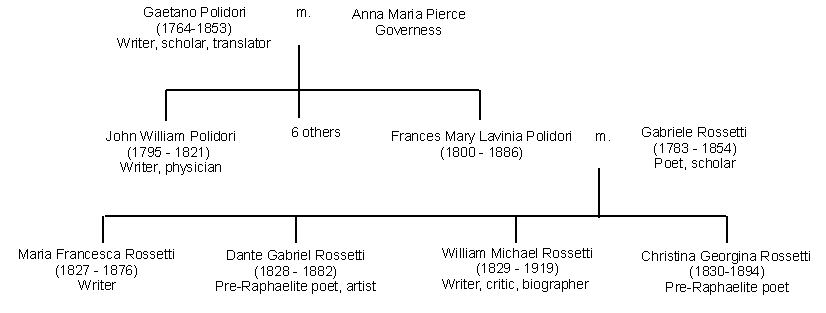
Rossetti–Polidori family tree

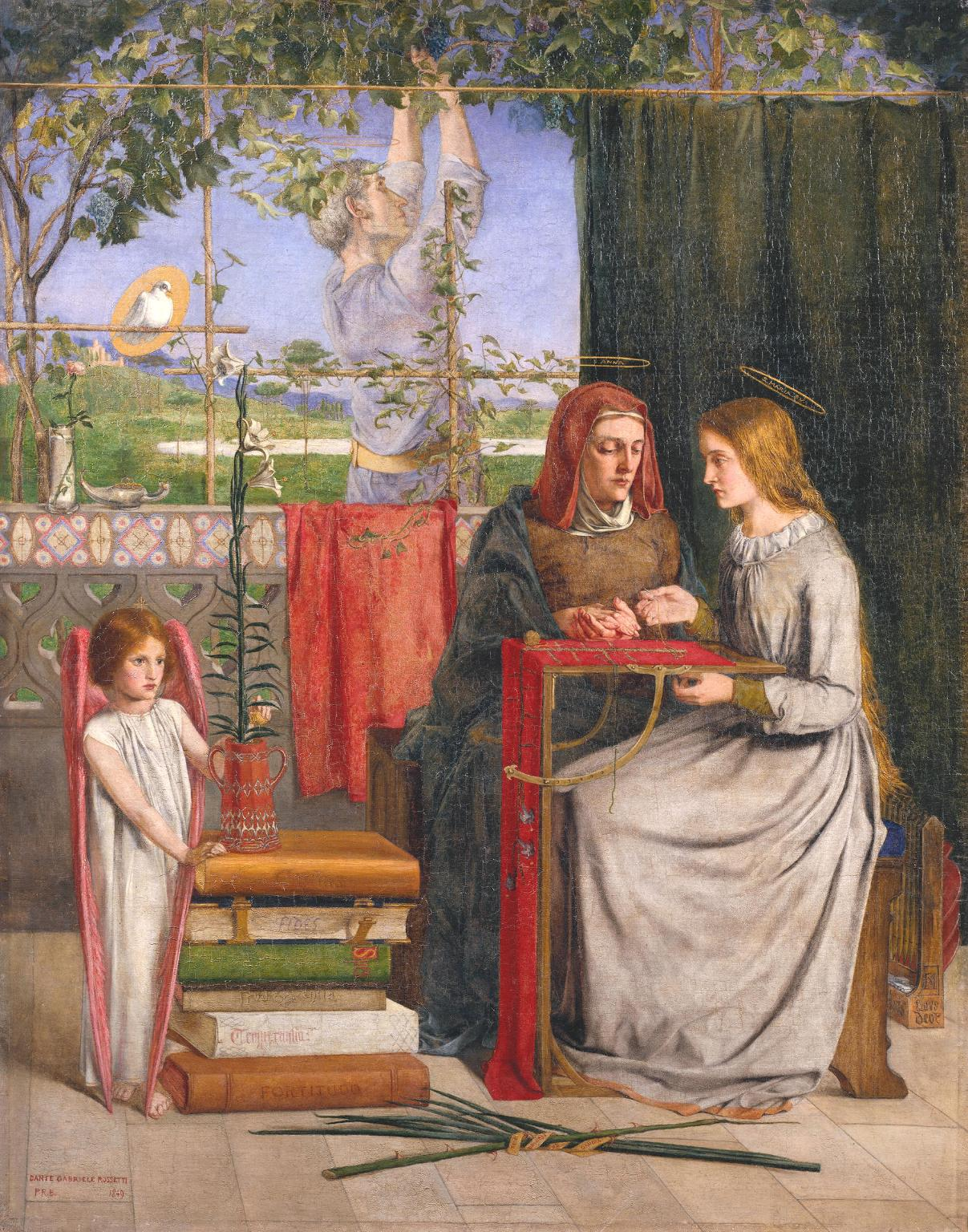
The Girlhood of Mary Virgin (1848/9) by Dante Gabriel Rossetti. Frances as Saint Anne, Christina Rossetti as Mary.

His family, the Polidoris, were of Greek descent. On 29 January 1793, Gaetano Polidori married an English governess, Anna Maria Pierce of Middlesex (b. c. 1774), and they had seven children. His oldest son John William Polidori was a physician to Lord Byron and author of the first vampire story in English, The Vampyre (1819).

His daughter Frances (Frances Mary Lavinia Polidori, 27 April 1800 – 8 April 1886) in 1826 married exiled Italian scholar Gabriele Rossetti. They had four children, Maria Francesca Rossetti, Dante Gabriel Rossetti, William Michael Rossetti and Christina Georgina Rossetti. After Gabriele's death in 1854, Frances burned the remaining copies of his book Il Mistero dell' Amor Platonico del Medio Evo. Frances herself died in 1886 and was buried in the family plot at Highgate Cemetery.

Maria (1827–1876), wrote a book about Dante Alighieri and later became an Anglican nun.

Gabriel Charles Dante (1828–1882) and William Michael (1829–1919) were among the co-founders of the Pre-Raphaelite Brotherhood. Frances sat for Gabriel for some of his early paintings, for example, The Girlhood of Mary Virgin, in which she modelled for Saint Anne.

Christina Georgina (1830–1894) became famous as a poet and is the author of the poem Goblin Market.
