= Lawrence After Arabia =

Play by Howard Brenton

- First edition Nick Hern Books, 2016
- Original language: English
- Written by: Howard Brenton

Premiere
- Date: 28 April 2016
- Place: Hampstead Theatre, London

Lawrence After Arabia is a 2016 play by the British playwright Howard Brenton, centred on T. E. Lawrence and his 1922 retreat from public life at the home of his friends George Bernard Shaw and his wife Charlotte. Its premiere production ran from 28 April to 4 June 2016 at the Hampstead Theatre in London to mark the centenary of the outbreak of the Arab Revolt, in which Lawrence played a leading part.

== Cast ==
- T. E. Lawrence - Jack Laskey
- George Bernard Shaw - Jeff Rawle
- Charlotte Shaw - Geraldine James
- Lowell Thomas - Sam Alexander
- Prince Feisal - Khalid Laith
- Edmund Allenby - William Chubb
- Blanche Patch - Rosalind March
- Mohammed Abdullah - Kai Spellman.

== Critical reception ==
The Independent found it "intriguing, richly researched but underpowered"; while The Daily Telegraph noted "A quiet, but highly topical, masterpiece...clever and engaging...the skill of the play is that it doesn’t make you think; it lets you think"; and The Times found it "Fascinating...it feels as if we have been given a magic window to see what really happened to Lawrence after Arabia."
