= Frances Polidori =

British educator (1800–1886)

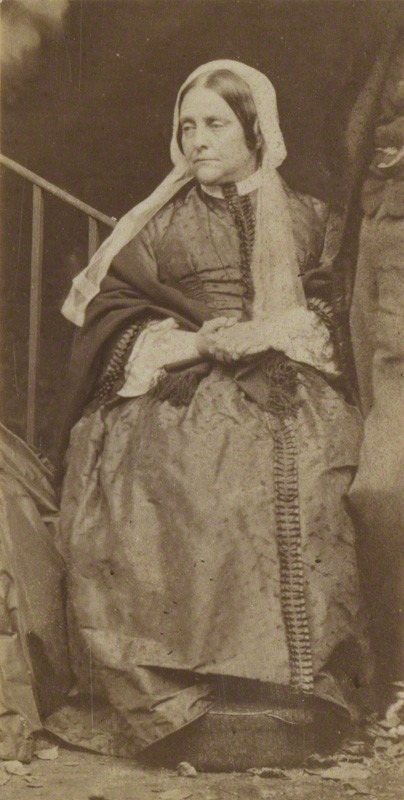
- Frances Polidori, 1863, photograph by Charles Lutwidge Dodgson
- Born: Frances Mary Lavinia Polidori; 27 April 1800; London, Great Britain
- Died: 8 April 1886 (aged 85); London, United Kingdom of Great Britain and Ireland
- Works: Model, educator
- Spouse: Gabriele Rossetti
- Children: Maria; Dante Gabriel; William Michael; Christina
- Father: Gaetano Polidori
- Relatives: John William Polidori (brother)

Frances Mary Lavinia Rossetti (née Polidori; 27 April 1800 – 8 April 1886) was a British educator who was the daughter, wife, sister and mother of important writers and artists. She was also a model of the paintings of her son Dante Gabriel Rossetti. Some photographic portraits of the Rossetti family by Lewis Carroll in the Victorian era are permanently displayed at the National Portrait Gallery, London.

== Biography ==
Frances Mary was born in London on 27 April 1800 to the Italian exile Gaetano Polidori, of Greek descent, who served as former secretary of Vittorio Alfieri, and the Englishwoman Anna Maria Pierce, an Anglican, private governess to high-born families, and daughter of a successful writing teacher. Of her four brothers, the best-remembered is John William Polidori, Lord Byron's personal physician.

Frances received an excellent education from her parents and, at the age of 26, she married the Italian poet, patriot and exile, Gabriele Rossetti. They had four children: Maria Francesca, born in 1827; Dante Gabriel, born in 1828; William Michael, born in 1829; and Christina Georgina, born in 1830.

The couple devoted themselves to the education of their children. While the boys were sent to boarding school, the education of the Rossetti girls was taken up enthusiastically by their mother. Frances, whose native language was English, was also an accomplished speaker of both French and Italian. She played a fundamental role in this educational enterprise.

The learning environment developed by the couple had uncommon effects on the cultural growth of their four children. In just a short time, they overtook their mother and teacher. However, Frances continued to play an active role in the lives of her daughters. In 1840, Maria Francesca Rossetti printed a translation of the poem by Giampietro Campana In the death of Guendalina Talbot. It was the first work of many to be produced by her children.

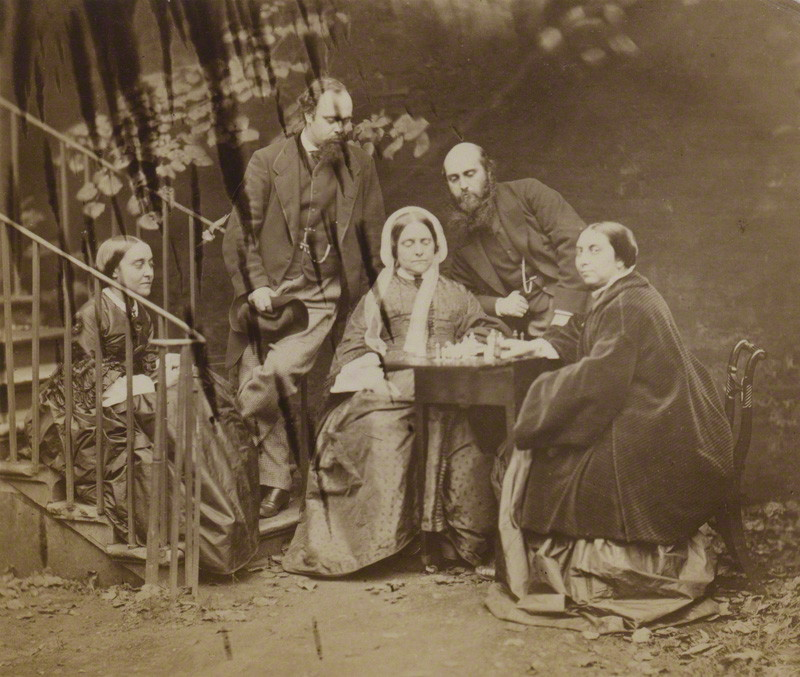
The Rossetti Family (1863), by Lewis Carroll, from the right Maria Francesca, William Michael, Frances Polidori, Dante Gabriel, Christina – Cheyne Walk of Chelsea (family portrait kept at National Portrait Gallery, London)

Gabriele received a Roman Catholic education and he was a free Christian thinker on very critical positions concerning papal politics, while Frances was a devout Anglican. The couple agreed on the religious education of their children: their sons were educated by Gabriele, while their daughters were taught by Frances. Their mother's influence profoundly defined the lives of the Rossetti girls.

In 1854, after Gabriele's death, Frances burned the remaining copies of her husband's book:The Mystery of the Platonic Love of the Middle Ages, a work of about 1500 pages divided into 5 volumes. It contained a history of the various currents of Western esotericism, which was printed in a limited run of one hundred copies in 1840. Due to its controversial content, it was not widely distributed upon its release. Some copies were saved because Gabriele had given them as gifts. The entire digitized work is available online (in Italian).

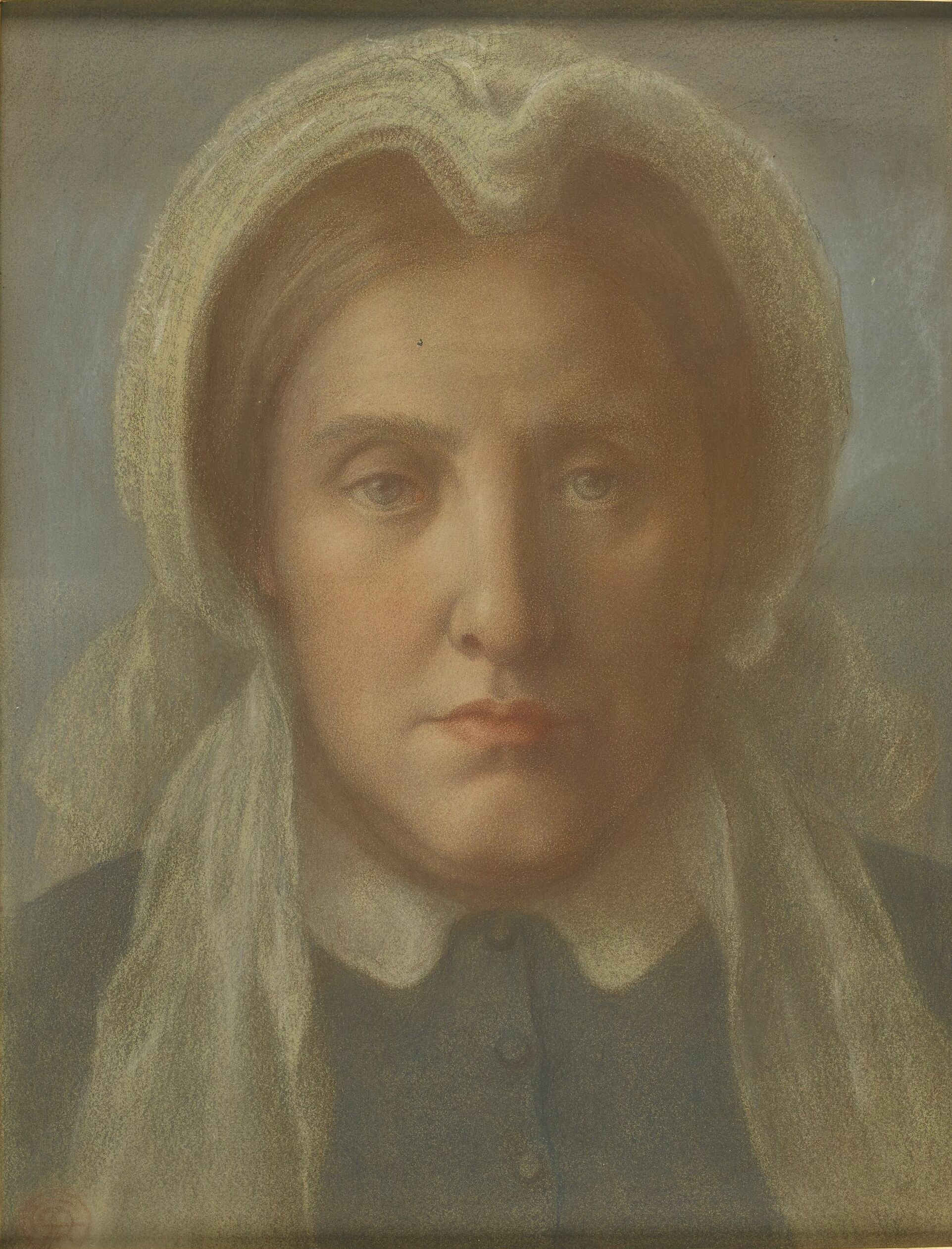
Portrait of Frances Gabriele Rossetti the Artist's Mother (1877)

The Rossetti children always remained very attached to their parents. Christina dedicated almost all her works to her mother. In Speaking likenesses, she thanks her for the stories she told her children. In 1874, when William Michael and Lucy Madox Brown got married, they went to live with Frances and her daughter Christina; after about two years of cohabitation, Lucy gave birth to their first child, and the couple were compelled to find another arrangement, largely because their agnosticism conflicted with the religious intransigence of Frances and Christina.

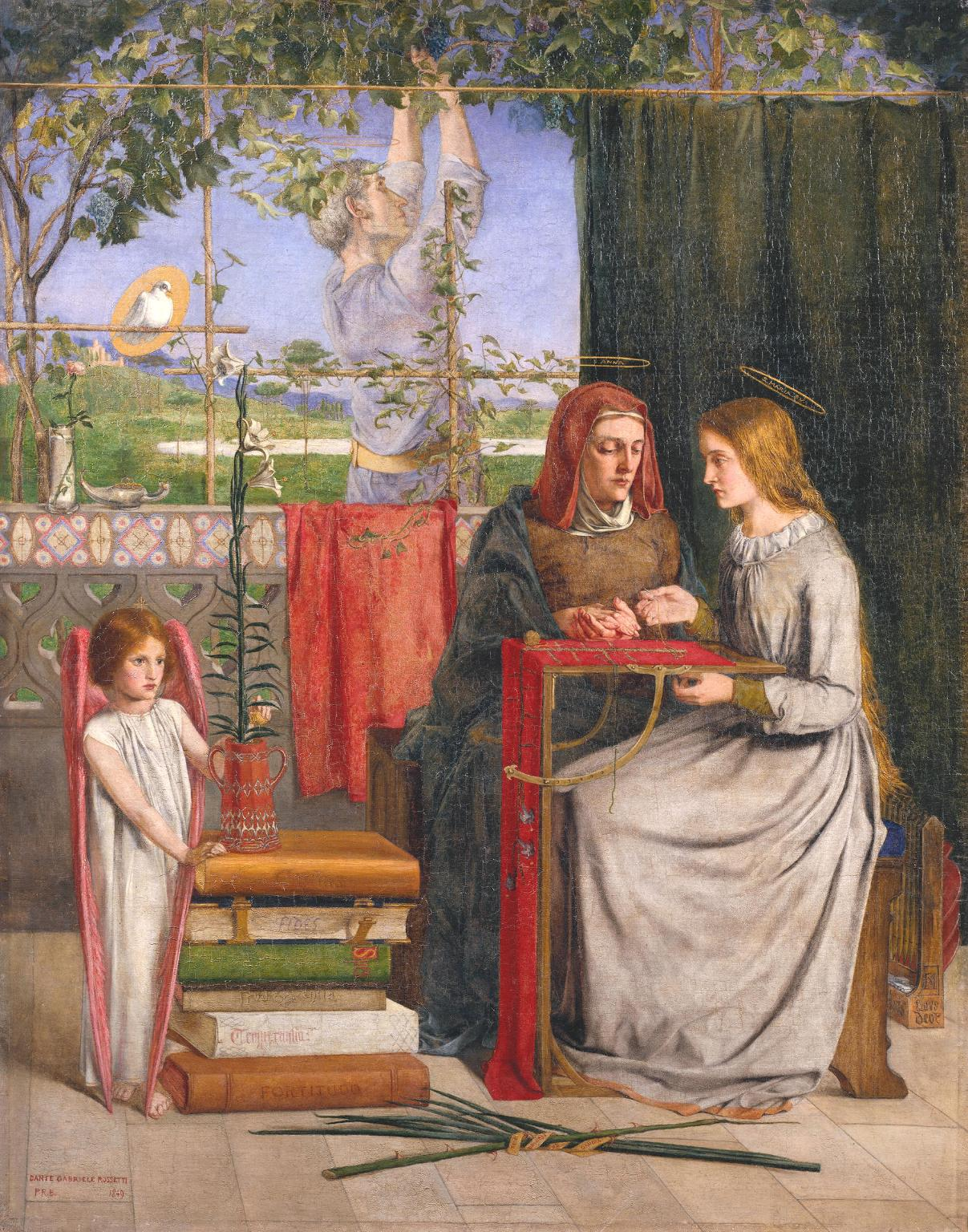
1849, The Girlhood of Mary Virgin, by Dante Gabriel Rossetti

Frances was often portrayed by her son Dante Gabriel, and posed as a model for some of his early paintings. The work The Girlhood of Mary Virgin of 1849 is particularly significant. As the author writes in a letter to Charles Lyell, the theme of the painting is education. The son projecting his family experience, enhances the qualities of the mother who is depicted in the act of educating her daughter Christina. The two lend their figures to Anne, who oversees the education of her young daughter Mary, intent on embroidering, while her father, in the background, works in the vineyard. Various other symbols complete the picture. In 1863, Lewis Carroll, a close friend of the family, took several group portraits of the Rossettis.

Frances died on 8 April 1886 and was buried with her husband and Dante Gabriel's wife, Elizabeth Siddal, in the family grave on the west side of Highgate Cemetery in London. Later burials in the same grave are Christina Georgina (1895) and William Michael (1919). The ashes of four grandchildren have also been subsequently buried in the grave.

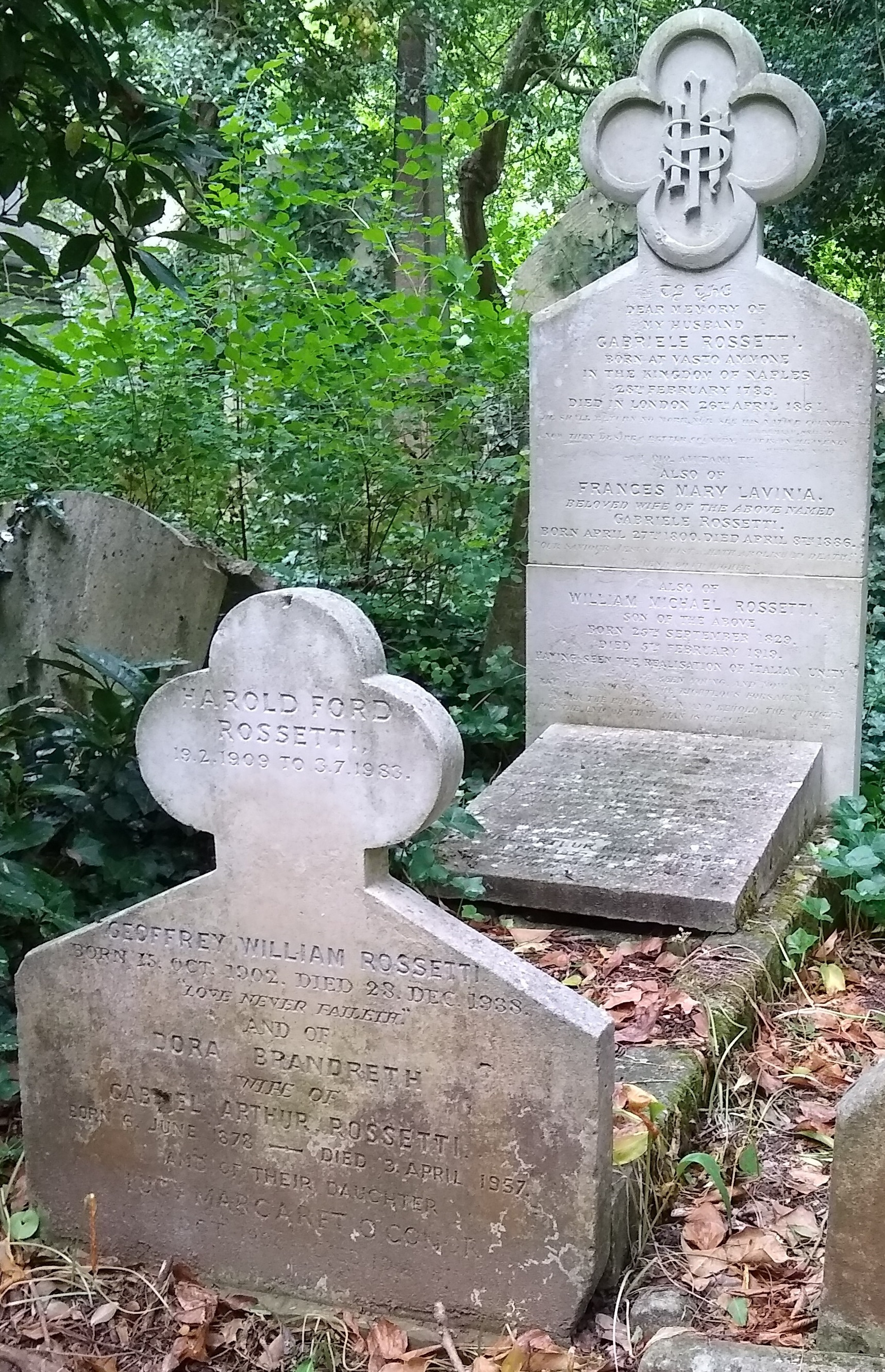
Rossetti family grave in Highgate Cemetery

== Sources ==
- Rossetti–Polidori family tree
- Thomas, Frances (1994). Christina Rossetti: A Biography. Hachette UK. ISBN 978-1-4055-2500-8.
- Rossetti, William Michael. "Dante Gabriel Rossetti: his family-letters". Charlottesville, Virginia: Institute for Advanced Technology in the Humanities. – a transcript of: Rossetti, William Michael (1970) [1895]. Dante Gabriel Rossetti: his family-letters. New York: AMS Press. ISBN 0-404-05434-X.
- Oliva, Gianni (2010). I Rossetti : album di famiglia: documenti, testimonianze, immagini (in Italian). Lanciano: Casa editrice Rocco Carabba. ISBN 978-88-6344-140-6.
- Rossetti, Gabriele; Rossetti, William Michael; Oliva, Gianni (2004). La vita mia Il testamento - con scritti e documenti inediti di W.M.Rossetti (in Italian). Lanciano: Casa editrice Rocco Carabba. ISBN 978-88-88340-53-1.

== Gallery ==
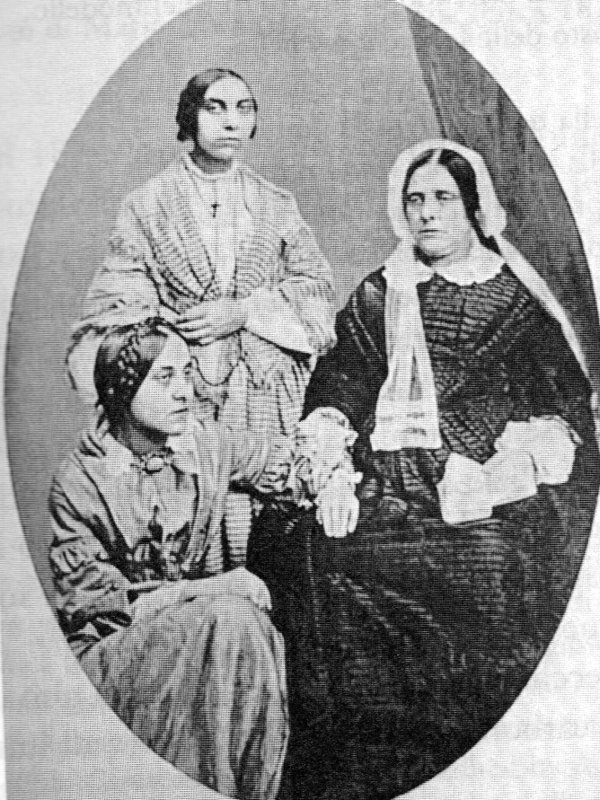
1855, Frances Polidori with Maria Francesca and Christina

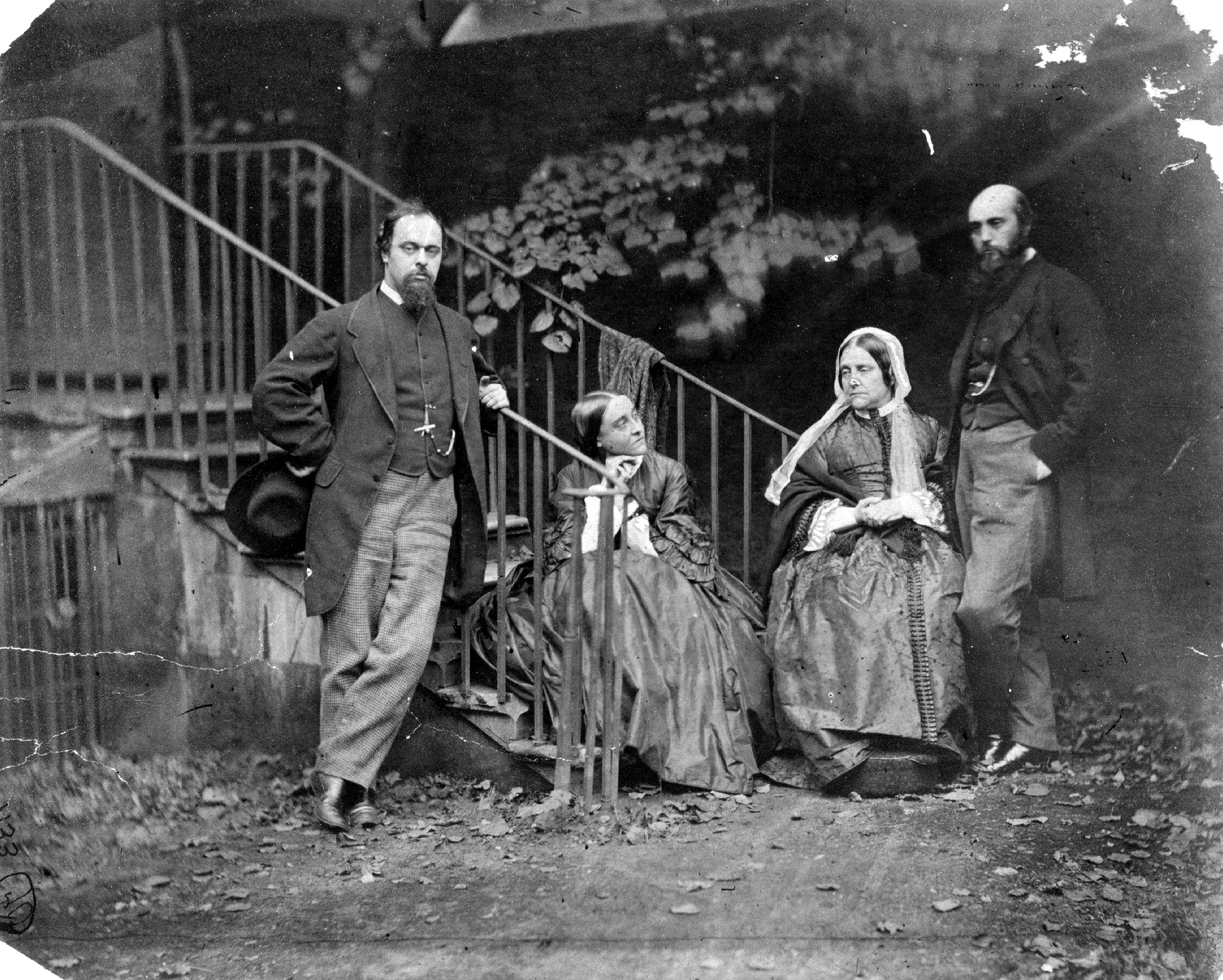
1863, family portrait by Lewis Carroll

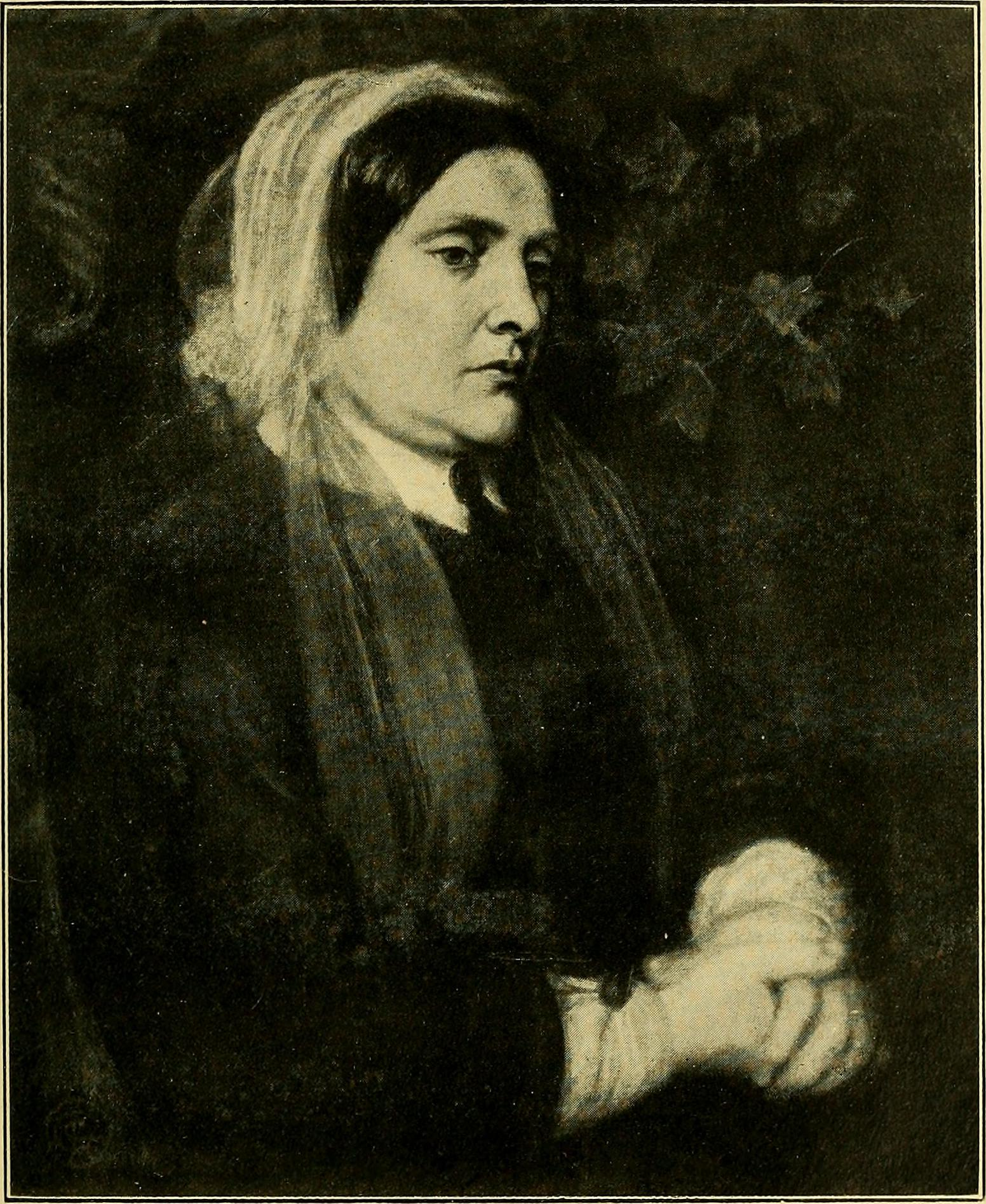
c.1865, from an oil portrait by D. G. Rossetti

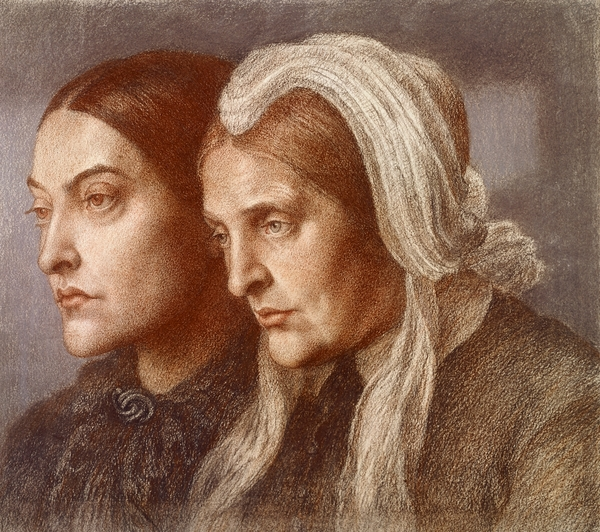
1877, Portrait of Christina Rossetti and Frances Polidori, by D. G. Rossetti

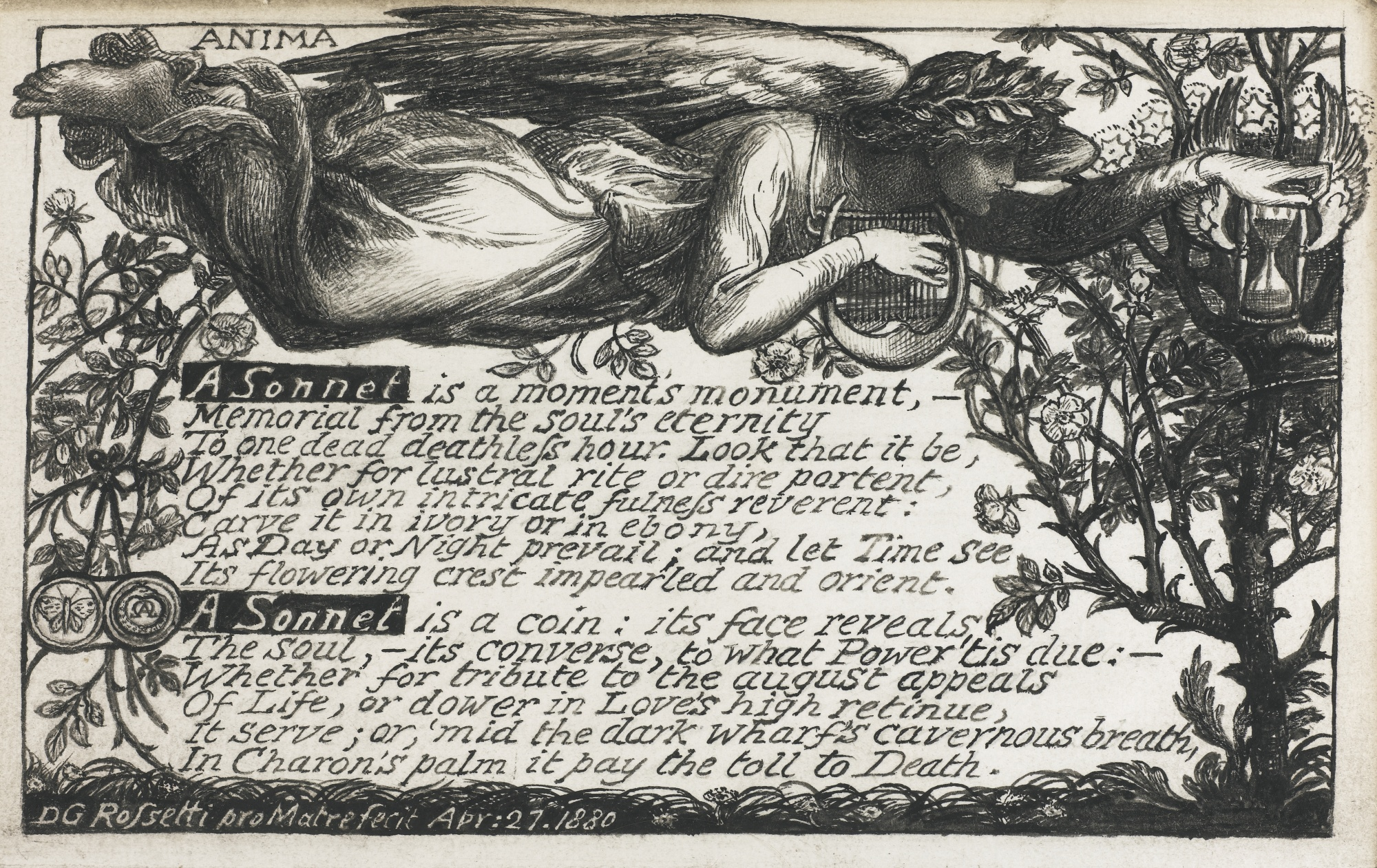
1880, birthday, D.G. Rossetti pro matre fecit
