= The Churchill Play =

The Churchill Play is a play by Howard Brenton. Written in 1974, the play offers a dystopian picture of an authoritarian England ten years in the future (i.e. 1984) and is set in an internment camp named after Winston Churchill. The play of the title is actually a play within a play, one put on by inmates of the camp, in which soldiers stand guard over Churchill's catafalque, only for him to rise from the dead.

Originally performed at the Nottingham Playhouse in 1974, it was directed by Richard Eyre and designed by Hayden Griffin. Among the cast were Julian Curry, Bill Dean, Dave Hill, Colin McCormack, Jonathan Pryce, Eric Richard, Roger Sloman, Tom Wilkinson, James Warrior and Jane Wymark.

A slightly rewritten version of the play was presented by the Royal Shakespeare Company in 1978, first at The Other Place, then at the Warehouse Theatre. For this production the director was Barry Kyle and the cast included John Bowe, David Bradley, Bill Dean, Donald Douglas, Geoffrey Freshwater, Philip McGough, Hilton McRae, John Nettles, Ian Reddington, and Juliet Stevenson.

The critic Harold Hobson admired Brenton's writing, but found much of his perceived criticism of Churchill and take on the Second World War to be misplaced.
