= Gedichte im Exil =

1937 poetry collection by Bertolt Brecht

Gedichte im Exil is a 1937 collection of lyric poems by the German author Bertolt Brecht, on the subject of his exile from Germany after the Nazis took power. It was adapted for the stage as Conversations in Exile by the English playwright Howard Brenton in 1987.

== Sources ==
- Bruckner, D. J. R. (1987-11-03). "The Stage: 'Conversations in Exile'". The New York Times. p. 15. ISSN 0362-4331.
- Speirs, Ronald (2000). Brecht's Poetry of Political Exile. Cambridge University Press. p. 27 (Note 25). ISBN 978-0-521-78215-9.
