= Weapons of Happiness =

1976 play by Howard Brenton

- Cover of original National Theatre programme
- Original language: English
- Written by: Howard Brenton

Premiere
- Date: July 14, 1976
- Place: National Theatre, London
- Directed by: David Hare

Weapons of Happiness is a 1976 political play by Howard Brenton, about a strike in a London crisp factory. The play makes use of a dramatic conceit whereby the Czech communist cabinet minister Josef Frank is imagined alive in the 1970s (in real life he was hanged in 1952), and his hallucinations of life in Stalinist Czechoslovakia interweave with the main plot.

In an introduction to the play, Brenton wrote that he was "trying to write a kind of Jacobean play for our time, a 'British epic theatre'. Making only limited use of naturalism, the play features several long speeches; in the same introduction Brenton quotes Julie Covington, who appeared in the original production, as describing acting in it as being "like opening a furnace door - your time comes, you open the door and blaze, then shut it".

== Stage history ==
The play was commissioned by the National Theatre as part of a policy of staging new plays by leading authors in the company's new South Bank home. At the time Brenton was a Marxist and seen as something of a polemicist; however, in an interview with Theatre Quarterly from around the time the play was being written, he expressed dissatisfaction with fringe theatre - the context in which his plays had previously been seen - and a desire to reach the bigger audiences subsidised theatre companies would provide. Furthermore, in the play's programme, Brenton disclaimed being a moralist.

Weapons of Happiness became the first commissioned play to be performed at the reopened National Theatre when it premièred on the Lyttelton stage on 14 July 1976. The cast included Geoffrey Bateman as Joseph Stalin, Nick Brimble, Julie Covington, Frank Finlay as Josef Frank, Bernard Gallagher, Michael Medwin, William Russell and Derek Thompson. It was designed by Hayden Griffin and directed by David Hare, a collaborator of Brenton from Portable Theatre Company and co-writer with him of Brassneck and Pravda, itself staged at the National. Given the subject of the play, it is ironic that its first production took place against the backdrop of the National Theatre itself undergoing a good deal of difficulties with trade unions.

While the play drew in a younger, more radical audience to the National Theatre, Peter Hall, the artistic director of the theatre, noted in his diary that the stage crew (many of whom were political) did not care for it, and that he was disappointed by the newspaper reviews. However, Michael Coveney was enthusiastic, describing in the Financial Times "highly charged scenes that speak directly about the quality of life in England today". The production ran for 41 performances, and Weapons of Happiness went on to win the Evening Standard Award for Best Play.

The play was sufficiently successful that after it opened Peter Hall asked Brenton for another, which would be the controversial The Romans in Britain.

Weapons of Happiness was revived at the Finborough Theatre in 2008. It received middling-to-good reviews, with the worst notices coming from The Times and the London Evening Standard.
