= Snoo Wilson =

English playwright and screenwriter (1948–2013)

- Born: Andrew James Wilson; 2 August 1948; Reading, Berkshire, England
- Died: 3 July 2013 (aged 64); Ashford, Kent, England
- Education: Bradfield College; University of East Anglia
- Occupations: Playwright, screenwriter and director
- Writing career
- Language: English
- Years active: 1967–2013
- Website: Snoo Wilson's official website

Andrew James Wilson (2 August 1948 – 3 July 2013), better known as Snoo Wilson, was an English playwright, screenwriter and director. His early plays such as Blow-Job (1971) were overtly political, often combining harsh social comment with comedy. In his later works he moved away from purely political themes, embracing a range of surrealist, magical, philosophical and madcap, darkly comic subjects.

After studying literature at the University of East Anglia, Wilson began his writing career in 1969. He began to build his reputation with a series of plays and screenplays in the early 1970s and was a founder of Portable Theatre Company, a touring company concentrating on experimental theatre. In the mid-1970s, he served as dramaturge to the Royal Shakespeare Company and produced one of his best-regarded plays, The Soul of the White Ant. In 1978, his surrealist play The Glad Hand attracted favourable notice, as did his 1994 play, Darwin's Flood, among others. He continued to write plays and screenplays until the end of his life, including for the Bush Theatre. He also wrote several novels and held teaching positions.

== Biography ==
=== Early years ===
Wilson was born in Reading, the son of two teachers: Leslie Wilson and his wife Pamela Mary née Boyle. Snoo was a childhood nickname. He was educated at Bradfield College, where his father taught, and the University of East Anglia (UEA), graduating with a degree in American and English Literature in 1969. At UEA, he was a student of Lorna Sage and Malcolm Bradbury. Wilson's early plays, the one-act Girl Mad as Pigs and the two-act Ella Daybellfesse's Machine, were first produced at UEA in, respectively, June and November 1967. Two years later, a second one-act play, Between the Acts, was first produced in Canterbury, at the University of Kent.

In 1969, Wilson embarked on a writing career. Together with Tony Bicat and David Hare, Wilson founded the Portable Theatre Company, a touring company concentrating on experimental theatre, and was its associate director from 1970 to 1975. His plays from these years included four one-act works, Charles the Martyr (1970), Device of Angels (1970), Pericles, The Mean Knight (1970) and Reason (1972), most of which dealt with overtly political subjects.

=== 1970s ===
Wilson's first full-length works to attract notice were Pignight and Blow-Job, both produced in 1971, in which "Horror and farce sat side by side." Pignight, the first of his own plays that Wilson directed, is a nightmarish fantasy about a mentally disturbed former soldier, who, while on a Lincolnshire pig farm, believes that pigs are about to take over the world. Dusty Hughes called it "a vivid and emetic portrait of rural change and urban corruption". Critic Michael Billington described it as a "savage and disenchanted portrait of rural life". Blow-Job is a political exploration of urban violence during which a quantity of raw meat is thrown on stage to simulate the corpse of an Alsatian dog that has just been blown up. With some reservations, Irving Wardle praised the piece in The Times for its "authentic sense of horror … its intermingling of physical outrage and savage farce."

In Wilson's 1973 full-length play, The Pleasure Principle, comedy, politics and social comment were again combined, but to less savage effect. Billington wrote, "On the one hand it is a strenuous indictment of ownership, property, greed and personal exploitation: on the other, it is a madhouse extravaganza that operates on the good old comic principle of always putting a bomb under the audience's expectations." In The Observer, Robert Cushman wrote, "This is one of the best plays of the seventies' heartless school; Coward's Design for Living is a fount of charity by comparison." Other full-length plays of this period were Vampire (1973) written for Paradise Foundry, The Beast (1974), staged by the Royal Shakespeare Company and The Everest Hotel (1975) for Bush Theatre, which he also directed. In the 1970s, Wilson's plays fell from favour with theatre producers who were looking for more commercial projects.

Wilson was successful with screenplays and teleplays in the 1970s, including Sunday for Seven Days (1971), The Good Life (1971), More About the Universe (1972), Swamp Music (1973), The Barium Meal (1974), The Trip to Jerusalem (1974), Don't Make Waves (1975) and A Greenish Man (1979). In 1975 and 1976, he was dramaturge to the Royal Shakespeare Company (RSC), and in 1976 he married the journalist Ann McFerran, a theatre critic, with whom he had two sons, Patrick and David, and a daughter, Jo- who now runs Lighthouse School of Speech, Drama and Communication.. In the same year, he became script editor of the BBC television anthology drama series, Play for Today. A play that year, The Soul of the White Ant, starring Simon Callow, was first produced at the Soho Poly. It is a dramatic treatment of a racial murder in South Africa and the ensuing cover-up by the police and the press. A white woman has an affair with a Black lover and then shoots him. It is "possibly [Wilson's] masterpiece".

In 1978, The Glad Hand, in which a South African tycoon employs a troupe of actors and sails an oil tanker through the Bermuda Triangle, hoping to conjure up the Anti-Christ and kill him in a Wild West gunfight, premiered at the Royal Court Theatre and won the John Whiting Award. Cushman wrote, "Sceptics like me have sometimes fallen foul of Mr Wilson's concern with the occult; here he makes it easy for us. Like Tom Stoppard he sets up impossible situations and explains them; and his wit in this piece has a Stoppardian exhilaration." Later that year, Wilson was appointed Henfield Fellow at the University of East Anglia.

=== Later years ===
Wilson's style grew away from the overtly political manner of his contemporaries David Hare and Howard Brenton, and he often wrote about the arcane, the occult, and the irrational, whether in the Gothic intrigues of Vampire (1973), the space aliens of Moonshine (1999), or the duelling wizards of The Number of the Beast (1982). Commenting on his interest in magical subjects, Wilson said, "It's only because people like to think that the material world is at base solid that they have to think of magic as a separate category of events. … The stage is very near magic in what it does and it's also composed of finally the same thing, which is sort of people and tinsel, which is all magic really is." On another occasion, Wilson commented, "I prefer to write for theatre because it can create the oldest magic. The question of its relevance is only asked by passive incredulous individuals who cannot swallow the idea that perception is an act." Nevertheless, while Wilson's "work is non-naturalistic and largely fantastical, it is based on concrete principals (sic) about the way we live."

Wilson often sought to fuse social criticism with a surrealistic, comic style. He said in 1978, "I think, well, you have to laugh, don't you? With all the dreadful, dreadful things going on I think of that as my way of keeping a grasp on my own sensibilities. In fact, it's the only way I have." He wrote some of his later plays for the Bush Theatre in Shepherd's Bush, including More Light (1987) and Darwin's Flood (1994). The first "convened Giordano Bruno with Elizabeth I, Doctor Dee and a female Shakespeare in heaven in 1600". In Darwin's Flood, Charles Darwin is visited on the eve of his death by his fascistic sister Elizabeth, her feckless husband Bernard, a dominatrix Mary Magdalene, the philosopher Friedrich Nietzsche, and Jesus in the guise of a wisecracking Irish bicyclist who seduces Darwin's wife, Emma. Meanwhile, a mammoth Ark breaks through the lawn of Darwin's backyard. The director Simon Stokes commented that there is a serious message behind such extravagances: "In a very humorous way the play is also asking: What if God does exist, and put the fossils in the rocks?"

A departure from Wilson's usual theatrical genres was in 1986, when he wrote a new libretto for Offenbach's Orpheus in the Underworld for the English National Opera. The reviews concentrated on the production designs, which strongly divided opinion; Wilson's work escaped the sharp censure directed at his colleagues, and his device of turning the bossy character "Public Opinion" into a parody of the then prime minister, Margaret Thatcher, was favourably remarked upon. Wilson's only play to have a production in the West End was HRH, concerning the Duke and Duchess of Windsor in exile. His television movies included Shadey, an ESP-themed piece for Channel 4 (1986) and Eichmann, about the interrogation of the eponymous character (2007). Two musicals, aimed at youth theatre, were Bedbug: The Musical, an adaptation of the 1929 play by Vladimir Mayakovsky, and a musical about the short and dramatic life of soldier-composer Felix Powell. Sabina (1998) "remains the best drama about Carl Jung's relationship with a young female mental patient, and later his student, Sabina Spielrein". In 2010, one of Wilson's last plays to be staged was Reclining Nude with Black Stockings, about the 1912 rape trial of Austrian painter Egon Schiele.

Wilson taught literature and theatre at various institutions both in Britain and America later in life. His academic posts included those of US Bicentennial Fellow in Playwriting (1981–82) and Associate Professor of Theatre at the University of California at San Diego (1987). He taught scriptwriting at the National Film School and returned to UEA as writer in residence. Of his non-theatre works, his 1984 novel, Spaceache, was described by Margaret Drabble and Jenny Stringer as "a dystopian fantasy of a grim and ruthless high-technology low-competence future". John Melmoth, the reviewer in The Times Literary Supplement, wrote that Wilson scored in his "nearness to the knuckle … a quirky, unpleasant and emetic sense of humour." Wilson also reviewed plays under the pseudonym Andy Boyle.

Wilson died of a heart attack in Ashford, Kent, on 3 July 2013, aged 64. The Times called Wilson, "the wild man of the theatre, a playwright of extravagant and idiosyncratic talent who broke most of the rules and never settled for the safe and ordinary."

Wilson's literary archive is held within the British Archive for Contemporary Writing at the University of East Anglia.

== Works ==
=== Selected plays ===
- Charles the Martyr (1970)
- Device of Angels (1970)
- Pericles, The Mean Knight (1970)
- Pignight (1971)
- Blow-Job (1971)
- Reason (1972)
- The Pleasure Principle: The Politics of Love, The Capital of Emotion (1973)
- Vampire (1973)
- The Everest Hotel (1975)
- The Soul of the White Ant (1976)
- The Glad Hand (1978)
- Spaceache (1980)
- The Number of the Beast (1982; revised version of The Beast, 1974)
- Flaming Bodies (1983)
- More Light (1987)
- 80 Days (1988; with music by Ray Davies)
- Darwin's Flood (1994)
- HRH (1997)
- Sabina (1998)
- Moonshine (1999)
- Love Song of the Electric Bear (2003)

=== Selected screenplays, TV and radio ===
- Sunday for Seven Days (1971)
- The Good Life (1971)
- More About the Universe (1972)
- Swamp Music (1973; episode of Thirty-Minute Theatre TV series)
- The Barium Meal (1974)
- The Trip to Jerusalem (1974)
- Don't Make Waves (1975)
- A Greenish Man (1979; episode of The Other Side TV series)
- Shadey (1985)
- Hippomania (2004 radio play)
- Eichmann (2007)

=== Novels ===
- Spaceache (1984)
- Inside Babel (1985)
- I, Crowley: Almost the Last Confession of the Beast 666 (1999)
- The Works of Melmont (2004)
