= Bloody Poetry =

1984 play by Howard Brenton

- Written by: Howard Brenton
- Characters: Percy Bysshe Shelley; Mary Shelley; Claire Clairmont; George Byron; Dr William Polidori; Harriet Westbrook; Voice
- Original language: English
- Setting: Switzerland, England and Italy 1816-1822

Premiere
- Date premiered: 1 October 1984
- Place premiered: Haymarket Theatre, Leicester

Bloody Poetry is a 1984 play by Howard Brenton centring on the lives of Percy Shelley and his circle.

The play had its roots in Brenton's involvement with the small touring company Foco Novo and was the third, and final, show he wrote for them. The initial idea was that Brenton should write a piece based on the life of Shelley, though Brenton was more interested in looking, not at the individual, but at the quartet of Percy, Mary Shelley, Lord Byron and Byron's mistress Claire Clairmont, tying it in with Utopian themes appropriate to the revolutionary spirit of the protagonists. In his introduction to the play Brenton disclaims any interest in moralising over the actions of his characters, as he had in a programme to his earlier play Weapons of Happiness.

The play takes as its epigraph a comment of Richard Holmes's, “Shelley's life seems more a haunting than a history.”

== Stage history ==
Bloody Poetry was first performed at the Haymarket Theatre, Leicester on 1 October 1984 in a production that later played at the Hampstead Theatre. The director was Roland Rees, and the cast was:

- Percy Bysshe Shelley – Valentine Pelka
- Mary Shelley – Fiona Shaw
- Claire Clairmont – Jane Gurnett
- George Byron – James Aubrey
- Dr William Polidori – William Gaminara
- Harriet Westbrook – Sue Burton

The play had its American west coast premiere in 1991 at Theatre 40 in Beverly Hills, under the direction of Keith Fowler, drawing excellent critical reception and winning the Dramalogue award for “Outstanding Direction.”

Nightingale Theatre produced the play in the summer of 1994 at The Union Chapel, Islington, London. Kate Godfrey (Claire Clairmont), Jane Gooderham (Harriet Westbrook), Melee Hutton (Mary Shelley), Mark Norton (Percy Bysshe Shelley), Peter Quilter (George Byron). with Cordelia Monsey directing.

The play played at the Manhattan Theatre Club in 1987 in a production directed by Lynne Meadow and was revived in 1988 at the Royal Court Theatre and in 2007 at the Chapter Arts Centre, Cardiff.

The play was staged by emerging company Invulnerable Nothings at The Brooklyn Art Library in 2016.
