= Maria Francesca Rossetti =

English author and nun (1827–1876)

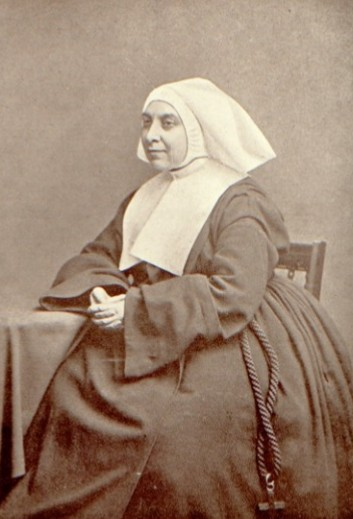
- Photograph c. 1874
- Born: 17 February 1827; London, England
- Died: 24 November 1876 (aged 49); London, England
- Occupations: Writer, nun
- Parents: Gabriele Rossetti; Frances Polidori
- Relatives: Dante Gabriel Rossetti (brother); Christina Georgina Rossetti (sister); William Michael Rossetti (brother); Gaetano Polidori (maternal grandfather); John William Polidori (maternal uncle)
- Writing career
- Notable works: The Shadow of Dante: Being an Essay Towards Studying Himself, His World and His Pilgrimage.

Maria Francesca Rossetti (17 February 1827 – 24 November 1876) was an English author and Anglican nun. She was the sister of artist Dante Gabriel Rossetti and William Michael Rossetti, and of Christina Georgina Rossetti, who dedicated her 1862 poem Goblin Market to Maria.

Maria Francesca’s literary work includes A Shadow of Dante: Being an Essay Towards Studying Himself, His World, and His Pilgrimage, published in 1871, which reflects her deep engagement with Dante Alighieri’s writings and Italian literary culture. In 1874, at the age of 47, she entered the Society of All Saints, an Anglican order of women.

Her younger sister Christina devoted her 1862 poem Goblin Market to Maria Francesca, acknowledging the bond between them. Maria Francesca died in November 1876 after a period of illness, leaving a legacy of writing and religious dedication.

== Life ==
She acted as a governess during the years of family hardship brought on by her father's failing health, and tutored a young Lucy Madox Brown, a future sister-in-law. Her siblings teased her about her plain appearance, nicknaming her 'Moony' for her rounded face.

She was a friend of John Ruskin, having visited his home at Denmark Hill, and at 28 she developed romantic feelings for him after his marriage was annulled, though she never married. Her sister Christina volunteered at the London Diocesan Penitentiary in Highgate from 1859 to 1870, and for much of that time Maria joined her there.

At the age of 46, Maria joined the Society of All Saints, an Anglican order for women. Lucy Madox Brown wanted to paint her in her habit. She made an English translation of the Monastic Diurnal for her order, The Day Hours and Other Offices as Used by the Sisters of All Saints, which was used by her order until 1922.

Maria died of ovarian cancer in 1876, despite drawn-out treatments to try to drain the tumour. She unsuccessfully attempted to convert her agnostic brothers on her deathbed. She was buried in the convent plot at Brompton Cemetery.

== Works ==
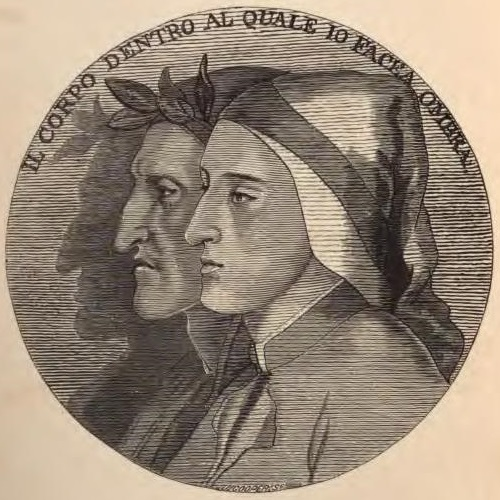
illustration by Dante Gabriel Rossetti for A Shadow of Dante

=== On Dante ===
- A Shadow of Dante: being an essay towards studying himself, his world and his pilgrimage, Rivingtons, London, 1871, ISBN 978-1108060769 edition HathiTrust Digital Library
- Dante's Pilgrimage Through Hell, Kessinger Publishing, LLC, 2005, ISBN 978-1425344696
- Dante's Pilgrimage Through Purgatory, Kessinger Publishing, LLC, 2005, ISBN 978-1162905099
- Dante's Pilgrimage Through Paradise, Kessinger Publishing, LLC, 2010, ISBN 978-1162905976
- Dante's Life Experience, Kessinger Publishing, LLC, 2010, ISBN 978-1425344689

=== Other ===
- Exercises in idiomatic Italian through literal translation from the English, Williams and Norgate, London 1867, ISBN 978-1108073318 edition Internet Archive
- Aneddoti italiani: Italian anecdotes, selected from "Il compagno del passeggio Campestre", Williams and Norgate, London 1867, ISBN 978-1175408587 edition Internet Archive
- Letters to My Bible Class on Thirty-nine Sundays, Nabu Press A, 2011, ISBN 978-1271589845
- The rivulets; a dream not all a dream, A. Dod, London, 1846, OCLC 42216558

== See also ==
- Rossetti–Polidori family tree
