= William Michael Rossetti =

English author and critic (1829–1919)

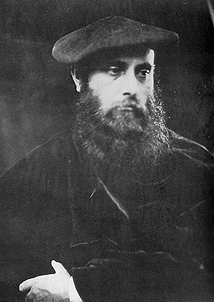
- William Michael Rossetti, by Julia Margaret Cameron
- Born: William Michael Rossetti; 25 September 1829; London, England
- Died: 5 February 1919 (aged 89); London, England
- Occupation: Writer
- Spouse: Lucy Madox Brown (m. 1874; died 1894)
- Children: 5, including Olivia
- Parents: Gabriele Rossetti; Frances Polidori
- Relatives: Dante Gabriel Rossetti (brother); Maria Francesca Rossetti (sister); Christina Georgina Rossetti (sister); Gaetano Polidori (maternal grandfather); John William Polidori (maternal uncle)

William Michael Rossetti (25 September 1829 – 5 February 1919) was an English writer and critic.

== Early life ==
Born in London, Rossetti was the son of exiled Italian scholar Gabriele Rossetti and his wife Frances Rossetti née Polidori; he was the brother of Maria Francesca Rossetti, Dante Gabriel Rossetti and Christina Georgina Rossetti.

== Career ==
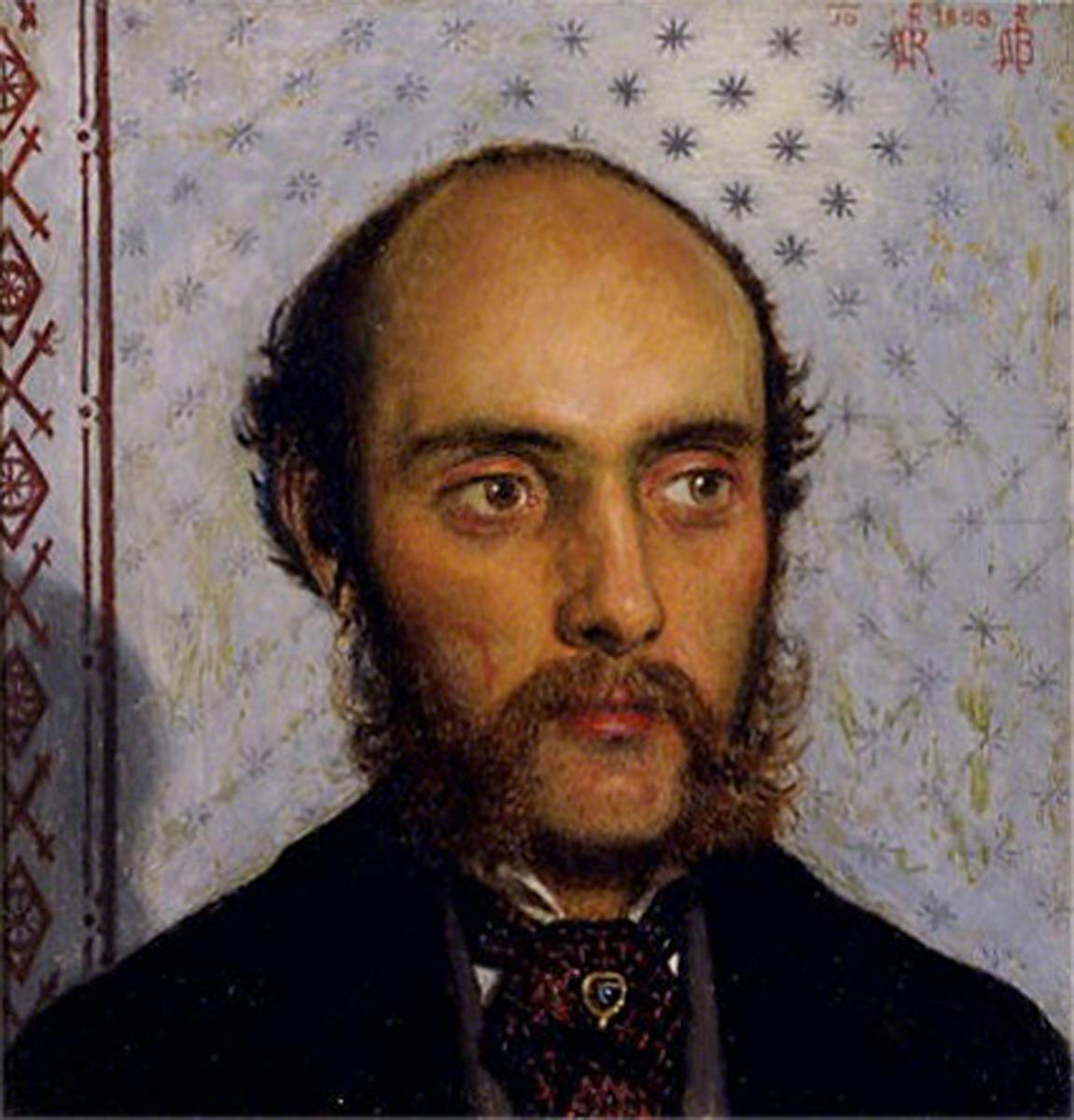
Brown, William Michael Rossetti by Lamplight

He was one of the seven founder members of the Pre-Raphaelite Brotherhood in 1848, and became the movement's unofficial organizer and bibliographer. He edited the Brotherhood's literary magazine The Germ, which published four issues in 1850. Rossetti wrote the poetry reviews for this magazine.

It was William Michael Rossetti who recorded the aims of the Pre-Raphaelite Brotherhood at their founding meeting in September 1848:

1. To have genuine ideas to express;
2. To study Nature attentively, so as to know how to express them;
3. To sympathize with what is direct and serious and heartfelt in previous art, to the exclusion of what is conventional and self-parading and learned by rote;
4. And most indispensable of all, to produce thoroughly good pictures and statues.

Although Rossetti worked full-time as a civil servant, he maintained a prolific output of criticism and biography across a range of interests from Algernon Swinburne to James McNeill Whistler. He edited the diaries of his maternal uncle John William Polidori (author of The Vampyre and physician to Lord Byron), a comprehensive biography of D. G. Rossetti, and edited the collected works of D. G. Rossetti and Christina Rossetti.

Rossetti edited the first British edition of the poetry of Walt Whitman, which was published in 1868; however, this edition was bowdlerized. Anne Gilchrist, who became one of the first to write about Whitman, first read his poetry from Rossetti's edition, and Rossetti helped initiate their correspondence.

William Michael Rossetti was a major contributor to the 1911 edition of the Encyclopædia Britannica; his contributions on artistic subjects were criticised by many reviewers at the time and since, as showing little evidence of having absorbed the mounting body of work by academic art historians, mostly writing in German. Below is a quotation from his article on Fra Angelico demonstrating his literary and art-historical style:

The "pietistic" quality of Fra Angelico's work is in fact its predominant characteristic. The faces of his figures have an air of rapt suavity, devotional fervency and beaming esoteric consciousness, which is intensely attractive to some minds ... the faces becoming sleek and prim, with a smirk of sexless religiosity which hardly eludes the artificial or even the hypocritical; because of this, there are some who are not moved by his work. Even so, Fra Angelico is a notable artist within his sphere.

== Personal life ==
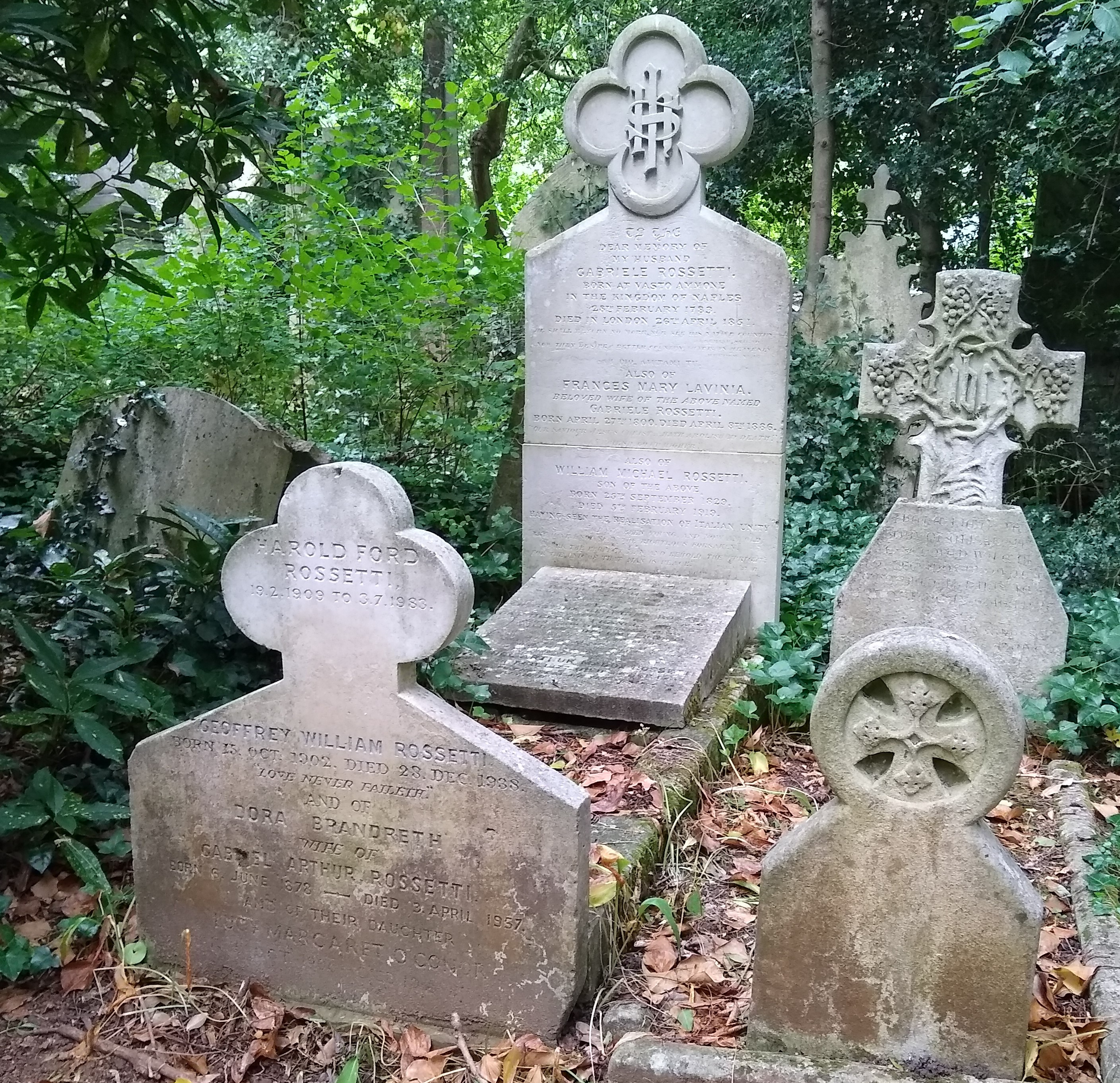
The Rossetti grave at Highgate Cemetery (West side)

In 1874 he married Lucy Madox Brown, daughter of the painter Ford Madox Brown. They honeymooned in France and Italy. Their first child, Olivia Frances Madox, was born in September 1875, and her birth was celebrated in an ode by Swinburne. A son, Gabriel Arthur, was born in February 1877, followed by another daughter, Helen Maria, in November 1879, and twins, Mary Elizabeth and Michael Ford, in April 1881. Rossetti and his wife did not have the children baptised, nor were they raised in a Christian household. The children were schooled at home by their mother and governesses.

Their son Michael died in infancy. In 1897, Olivia married an Italian anarchist refugee, Antonio Agresti. They later moved to Italy, where Olivia became a translator and writer. After she was widowed in 1926, she became an associate of Ezra Pound, and the two corresponded frequently. Gabriel Arthur, known as Arthur to the family, became a scientist, married Dora Lewis, and had several children. Helen became a painter of miniatures, and in 1903 married Gastone Angeli. He was in fragile health and died only a few months later. Helen gave birth to his posthumous daughter, Imogen Lucy, in 1904. In 1903, Helen and Olivia also published A Girl Among the Anarchists under the pseudonym 'Isabel Meredith'; the novel is a fictional recounting of their experiences in the anarchist movement.

William Michael Rossetti died on 5 February 1919 aged 89 and is buried in the Rossetti family grave on the west side of Highgate Cemetery. In the grave he joined his father, mother, Elizabeth Siddal (wife of his brother Dante) and his sister Christina. The ashes of his son Gabriel Arthur Maddox were interred in the grave in 1932, and three other members of the Rossetti family have also been buried there subsequently.

== Partial bibliography ==
- Rossetti, W. M. (1850). The Germ: thoughts towards nature in poetry, literature, and art. London: Aylott & Jones.
- Rossetti, W. M. (1869). Essays on early Italian and German books of Courtesy. London: Trübner.
- Rossetti, W. M. (1876). Walt Whitman. London: s.n.
- Rossetti, W. M. (1878). Lives of famous poets from Chaucer to Longfellow: with lists of minor poets whose biographies are not included. [S.l.]: Ward.
- Rossetti, W. M. (1880). American poetry: a representative collection of the best verse by American writers. London: Ward, Lock.
- Rossetti, W. M. (1886). Memoir of Percy Bysshe Shelley. London: Slark.
- Rossetti, W. M. (1889). Dante Gabriel Rossetti as designer and writer. London: Cassell & Company, limited.

== See also ==
- Rossetti–Polidori family tree
