= Portable Theatre Company =

Portable Theatre Company was a writer-led company that toured alternative arts venues in the UK from 1968 to 1973. Their aim was to present original writing that challenged mainstream theatre.

== A portable theatre ==
Tony Bicât and David Hare formed Portable Theatre in 1968, a year that saw widespread political unrest in Britain (and internationally) and where a youth orientated ‘counter culture’ flourished and was seen to challenge the existing order. The Drury Lane Arts Lab, set up by Jim Haynes the previous year, was an important venue for newly founded ‘alternative’ or ‘underground’ theatre companies. Haynes offered free rehearsal space for companies on the condition that they performed in the Arts Lab theatre. Prior to ‘Portable’ Bicât and Hare had staged an adaption of Kafka’s The Trial whilst students at Cambridge University and now through Haynes’s encouragement they developed a theatre piece intercutting Kafka’s diaries with selected other writings that became Inside Out . The actors were recruited from Arts Lab regulars and this was to be a touring company, hence, ‘portable’ theatre. '[They] work in basic outfits and with no setting other than chairs but, notwithstanding this, they manage to create and sustain a powerful, audience holding piece.'

== On the road with Kafka and Genet ==
Augusta Hope, their administrator, was successful at getting sponsorship – an electric typewriter from Olympia and a heavily subsidised VW van from Volkswagen. With a slight rejigging of the cast in January, Inside Out set off on road – performing at universities, colleges, arts labs and arts centres – travelling more than fifteen hundred miles in their first year As a writer-led company they were in a stronger position to receive Arts Council subsidy than actor-led experimental companies. Inside Out received a ‘new writing’ grant and their policy of taking theatre to non-tradition venues and audiences would continue to make them successful in getting further grants.

David Hare's first play How Brophy Made Good was directed by Tony Bicât and it joined their repertoire. Brophy is an apolitical television ‘personality’ whose career and demise is charted and interrogated by three idealistic friends. The Stage newspaper commented: ‘despite a muddle of Socialist politics,[it] is a surprisingly vital and impressive work’ Hare and Bicât had met Snoo Wilson at UEA and when he graduated in the summer, he joined them in a general production capacity for their second season. Jean Genet’s The Maids was presented in drag on a double bill with Purity – a study in censorship by David Mowat . A new work commissioned from Howard Brenton was to join it on tour in the autumn.

== Christie in Love ==
Brenton was a friend from Cambridge and had been a resident writer with the Brighton Combination in 1968 and now had a new play opening at the Royal Court Theatre Upstairs - Revenge - a ‘satirical melodrama’ about the relationship between criminals and the police and society. Brenton’s play for Portable was Christie In Love and it was toured from November prior to being brought to Oval House. Hare directed Christie in Love and explains the way commissioned material was developed to meet the company’s needs: ‘we started to shape plays deliberately to be portable – a kind of resilient drama you could throw on in a church hall. And they became more direct. The best of them is Howard Brenton’s Christie in Love, which is written specially to be thrown into places and just grab people by the throats at once’. The mild mannered serial killer, John Christie was played by William Hoyland in a naturalistic style whilst the interrogating police were grotesque caricatures – this mix of styles became a hallmark of Portable. Snoo Wilson was credited with the design – a pit of screwed up newspapers. Christie in Love’s popularity led to two revivals in 1970 and significantly clarified for Hare and Bicât the direction the company should take: ‘from now on, there was no question of Portable doing old plays’

== Shaking the audience ==
Whilst Hare’s claim about not doing old plays isn’t entirely accurate - there was a Snoo Wilson adaption of Pericles (Pericles, the Mean Knight) in February and Strindberg's The Creditors in June - Portable were gaining public attention and had developed a powerful house style with new work. Hare: ‘[Portable] expressed what the four of us were thinking at the time and what we had to say about the world.’ Hare explained the shortcomings of ‘mainstream’ theatre: ‘We felt that plays about psychology were simply irrelevant to what we took to be our country's terminal decline.’ The lifting of theatre censorship in 1968 had provided the Portable writers with the opportunity to challenge dominant ideas including those of what constituted ‘good taste’, hence Bicât’s comment: ‘…We wanted our work to shock. Plays…were designed to shake the audience and therefore the establishment. ’ Howard Brenton’s Fruit, directed by Hare, opened at the Edinburgh Festival Fringe. Brenton explained how he was ‘influenced by some French Situationist texts…In Fruit a man, for reasons of personal revenge and cynism, tries to bring down the Government – by blackmailing the Prime Minister, threatening to expose the MP’s homosexuality’ but when the blackmailer is beaten by the system he turns to working class revolution and violence. Theatre critic Michael Billington felt that it was a short-coming of Brenton’s play that ‘all politicians and power seekers [are shown] as irredeemably corrupt’ and the work endorsed ‘the climactic gesture of a revolutionary warehouseman who flings a home-made bomb against a wall to symbolise his contempt for authority.’ Fruit was in repertory that autumn with a new play by David Hare, What Happened to Blake? Described in the Kensington Post as ‘a brilliant, off-beat play …. that is every bit as eccentric, brilliant and unpredictable as [William] Blake …his weird and sometimes hilarious life is acted out by four great writers: Jane Austen; T. S. Eliot; William Wordsworth and Alexander Pope'. It was directed by Tony Bicât .

== Sheer exhaustion ==
By the end of this tour the sheer exhaustion of life on the road was getting to Hare and Bicât: "we were doing the laundry, we were doing the lights, we were buying the props, we were driving the van, we were organising the meals and we were just about going out of our minds after five months of this. Hare and Bicât were developing projects outside of Portable and Snoo Wilson was now taking on a major role, usually directing his own work. Alongside Pericles, the Mean Knight was a ‘comedy’ set in a post-nuclear war Britain - Device of Angels and in February 1971 Pignight toured prior to a London run at the Young Vic. The critic, Dusty Hughes notes that Wilson ‘used fiercely imagined characters in comic and often savage works’ and summarised Pignight’s plot: ‘a paranoid East End gangster and his prostitute girlfriend are sent to guard a battery pig farm inhabited by the ghosts of its former tenants, and are visited, with fatal consequences, by a German prisoner of war/farm worker who has escaped from a local asylum’.

== A new artistic director ==
In 1971, Portable were awarded an £8000 subsidy from the Arts Council. Although ‘they could now afford to pay themselves to run the company’ neither Bicât nor Hare wanted that job and rather than giving the money back they appointed Malcolm Griffiths to become the company’s artistic director. Bicât and Hare also knew Griffiths from Cambridge. He had then worked for four years in repertory theatre where he had become disillusioned by what he saw as their ‘reactionary’ programming '.... I told them exactly what I thought’. He began his season with Portable in April directing two new John Grillo plays, Zonk and Food at Edinburgh, London, Nottingham, the Midlands, Yorkshire, the South West and East Anglia.

== Collaborative writing ==
Although in May 1971 Hare said that ‘he no longer has anything to do with Portable Theatre’ he did seem to be instrumental in an ambitious collaborative group writing project in which Howard Brenton, Brian Clark, Trevor Griffiths, David Hare, Stephen Poliakoff, Hugh Stoddart, and Snoo Wilson contributed sections of a play. It fell upon Snoo Wilson to draw together the writing and to direct what became Lay By - premiered at the Edinburgh Festival. The writers used as springboard a lurid Sunday tabloid account of a court case concerning alleged rape. Chris Megson: ‘Lay By offers a kaleidoscope of perspectives on the plight of Lesley, a struggling drug user and porn model, who accuses a van driver of raping her ….The action retraces the events of the encounter while detailing Leslie’s difficult life and background; it also offers a putative critique of the exploitation of women in the sex industry and criminal justice system.’ The confrontational relationship the production took towards the audience in relation to the depiction of drug use, sex and violence led to controversy. Wilson quipped: ‘Lay By … has taken years off my life. We have alienated permanently a section of the British theatre-going public. People have fainted, passed out and dropped over the back of the rostra at the Traverse.’ 'Lay By enjoyed a ‘Succès de scandale ….partly because the Traverse cleverly scheduled it at 1.15 in the morning. This gave it a special glamour' Portable took two other productions to the festival playing in repertory at the Pool Theatre. Malcolm Griffiths had commissioned Plays for Rubber Go-Go Girls from Sheffield playwright Christopher Wilkinson and David Hare directed Snoo Wilson’s new play Blow Job. Plays for Rubber Go-Go Girls was directed and designed by Griffiths. The four short plays satirise the sex and violence of American pulp magazines targeted at US service-men – with stock characters of Nazi war criminals, Vietnam soldiers, revolutionaries, hippies and ‘go-go’ dancers. ‘Malcolm Griffiths’ direction finds a fast, fluid, cartoon acting style that puts across the full sickening morality’ Blow Job concerns two skinheads who go on a weekend job to ‘blow’ a safe in Liverpool – they make a mess of things and their gelignite blows up a dog. A guard’s throat is slit by a Laingian spouting girlfriend. Wilson was accused of gratuitous horror and the play ‘faced outrage from many of his audiences’ In the autumn Blow Job played at the Kings Head Theatre Club, Islington whilst Lay By had a Sunday evening production at the Royal Court and then ran for a week at the Open Space Theatre.

== A clash of approaches ==
However there had been clashes between Hare and Griffiths in Edinburgh over the direction that the company should take. Hare wanted to utilise ‘the arena of public statement’ presenting fewer plays in larger theatres, as opposed to the familiar underground circuit. Griffiths however wanted to rethink the company’s attitude to actors. Up to this point Portable hired actors for a thirteen week season and then let them go. Griffiths wanted a company – three men and three women – to operate as a theatre workshop whereby writers worked with the players in the shaping of the material and the development of projects. Now Hare and Bicât were ‘sleeping directors’ of Portable and Malcolm Griffiths was given carte blanche to set up the workshop company. ‘[We] told him to get on and do whatever he wanted, with the sole condition that it be different from what we had done. This permanent company –‘nobody can be sacked’ - started in April 1972 with Nick Ball; Michael Harringan; Diana Patrick; Mark Penfold; Pat Rossiter and Emma Williams. Griffiths was director, stage manager and, since Augusta Hope left Portable about this time, was also initially the company administrator.

== POTOWOCA ==
Portable Theatre Workshop Company - familiarly known as ‘POTOWOCA’ - started with a reworking of Plays for Rubber Go Go Girls in the summer. Their choice of a rarely performed Ibsen play in the autumn, When We Dead Awaken, proved to be ‘quite a traumatic experience for everyone concerned because it had such a vast emotional and imaginative span.’ The Ibsen play was in repertory with Go Go Girls and a new commissioned piece Point 101. Here 7 ten minutes pieces were responses to the idea of Room 101 in Orwell’s Nineteen Eighty-Four. The writers included Michelene Wandor, the only female playwright to be commissioned by Portable and the Ulrike Meinhof section was ‘the result of the company’s collective research and composition’

== England’s Ireland ==
As Griffiths’ Portable Theatre Workshop Company were finding their feet, David Hare wished to develop another collaborative writing project – this time about Northern Ireland and especially in response to the Bloody Sunday shootings. England’s Ireland was ‘an episodic look at the history of the British in Northern Ireland with different episodes shown from different perspectives’ The writers: Bicât, Hare, Wilson, Brenton, Brian Clark and Francis Fuchs visiting Belfast whilst researching the play‘ but none of us pretended to be experts’ – Hare and Wilson co-directed . Initially publicity for England’s Ireland utilised the Portable ‘label’ – but presumably to avoid confusion by the end of May ‘Mr. Hare …. announced the formation of Shoot, a company soon to embark on tours of large provincial theatres with plays on public themes’ The political nature of the play and the costs of touring a 12 actor show were problematic: ‘Some managements didn’t like the idea, some didn’t like the play. And many didn’t want to put their heads on the block over a controversial project they didn’t originate’ England’s Ireland opened at the Mickery Theatre, Amsterdam followed by five UK dates

== Going bankrupt ==
The Arts Council had insisted that a professional administration be appointed when Augusta Hope had left. Bicât commented ‘ Malcolm [Griffiths] did interesting work with the company, but the administrator failed to administrate. In 18 months the company was bankrupt.’ Following the winding up of Portable, Hare joined David Aukin and Max Stafford-Clark in the creation of Joint Stock Theatre Company (in 1974) under Joint Stock Theatre Company’s auspices, David Hare directed a Tony Bicat play: Devil’s Island (with Simon Callow in the cast) in 1976. Meanwhile Portable Theatre Workshop Company continued under Griffiths’ guidance with a new name 'Paradise Foundry' Their first productions were Snoo Wilson’s Vampyre and David Edgar’s Operation Iskra. Later there would be company devised pieces - Yin Yan Thank You Ma’am and Plastic prior to that company folding in 1975.
