= Gabriele Rossetti =

Italian-British politician, poet, and scholar (1783–1854)

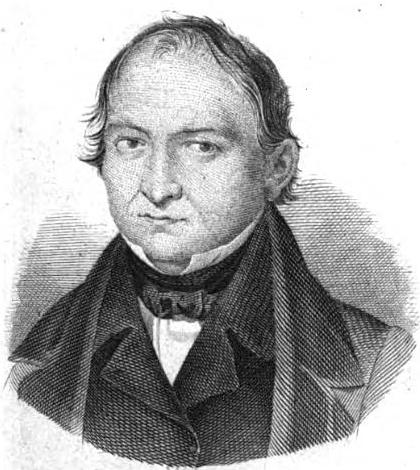
- Born: 28 February 1783; Vasto (Kingdom of Naples)
- Died: 24 April 1854 (aged 71); London (United Kingdom of Great Britain and Ireland)
- Occupations: Poet, writer, scholar
- Spouse: Frances Polidori
- Children: Dante Gabriel Rossetti, Maria Francesca Rossetti, William Michael Rossetti, Christina Rossetti

Gabriele Pasquale Giuseppe Rossetti (28 February 1783 – 24 April 1854) was an Italian nobleman, poet, constitutionalist, scholar, and founder of the secret society Carbonari.

Rossetti was born in Vasto in the Kingdom of Naples. He was a Roman Catholic. His support for Italian revolutionary nationalism forced him into political exile in England in 1821.

== Early career and exile ==
Rossetti's first edition of poems was printed in 1807 by Giovanni Avalloni, who offered to have them published after hearing Rossetti recite a few passages. Throughout his early career, Rossetti published poems that were "patriotic" and supported the "popular movement" in Sicily, which resulted in him receiving a grant from Ferdinand I of the Two Sicilies in 1820. When the king revoked the constitution in 1821, many supporters of the constitution were persecuted, but Rossetti was instead forced into exile in Malta for three years before a British admiral of the Royal Navy sent Rossetti to London in 1824. He held the post of Professor of Italian at King's College London from 1831, as well as teaching Italian at King's College School, until failing eyesight led to his retirement in 1847.

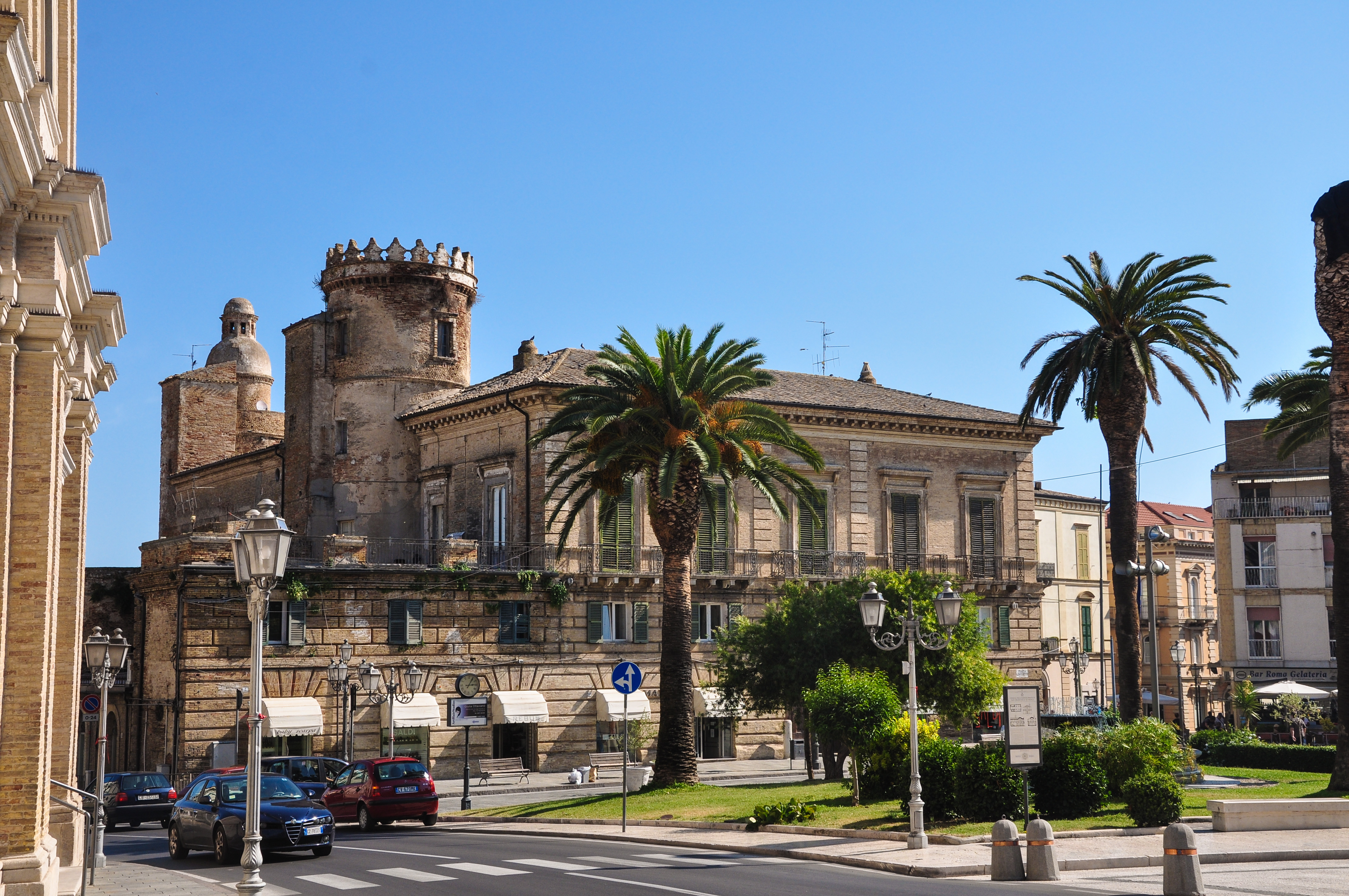
Piazza Rossetti, Vasto.

== Works ==
Rossetti's published works include literary criticism, Romantic poetry such as his long poem Il veggente in solitudine of 1846, and his Autobiography. He is thought to be the basis of the character Pesca in Wilkie Collins' 1860 novel The Woman in White. He also wrote commentaries on Dante Alighieri in which he attempted to show evidence of mysterious ancient conspiracies in his works.

== Personal life ==
In 1826, he married Frances Mary Lavinia Polidori, daughter of another Italian exile, Gaetano Polidori, and they had four children, all distinguished writers or artists:

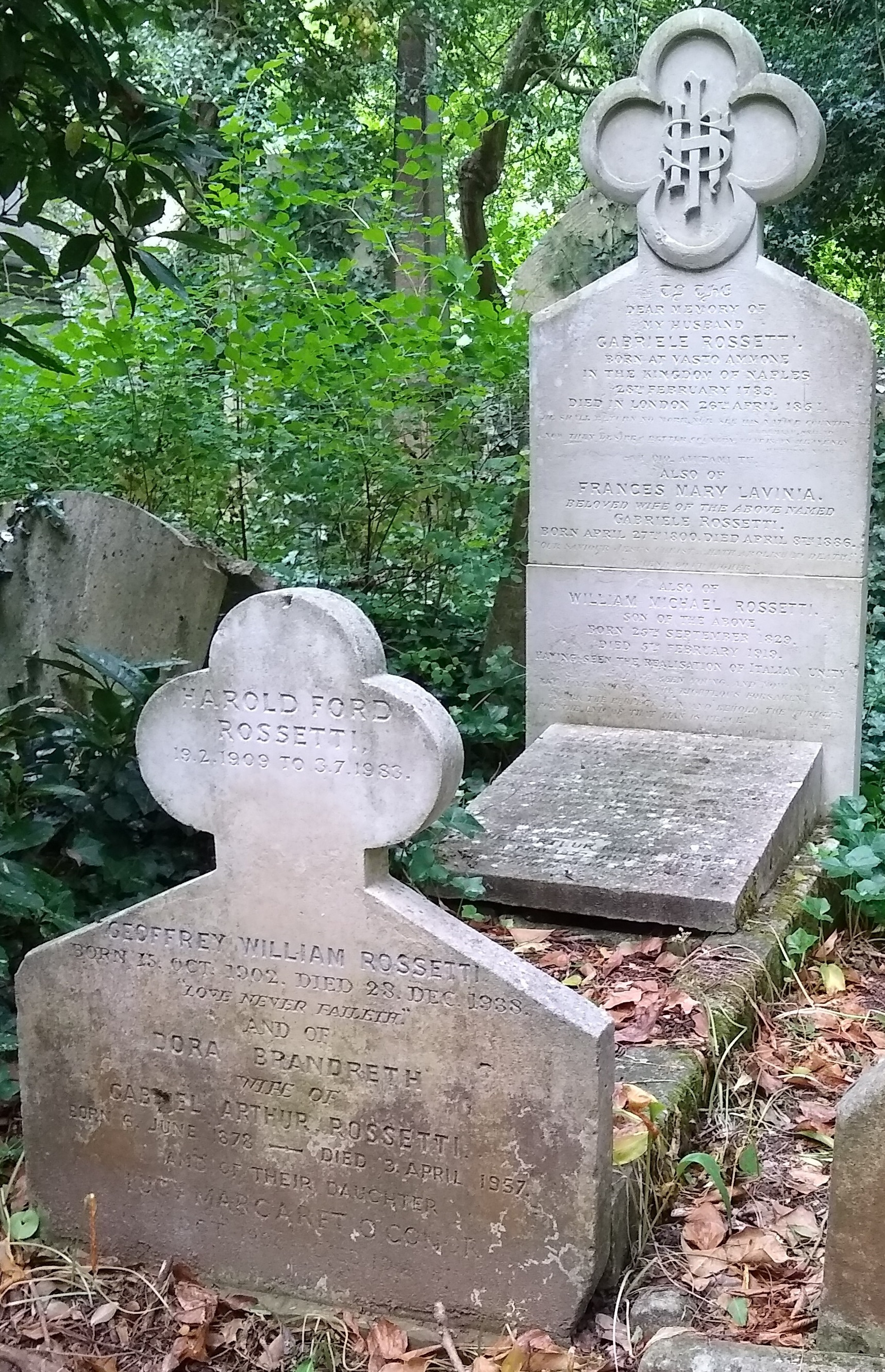
Rossetti family grave in Highgate Cemetery

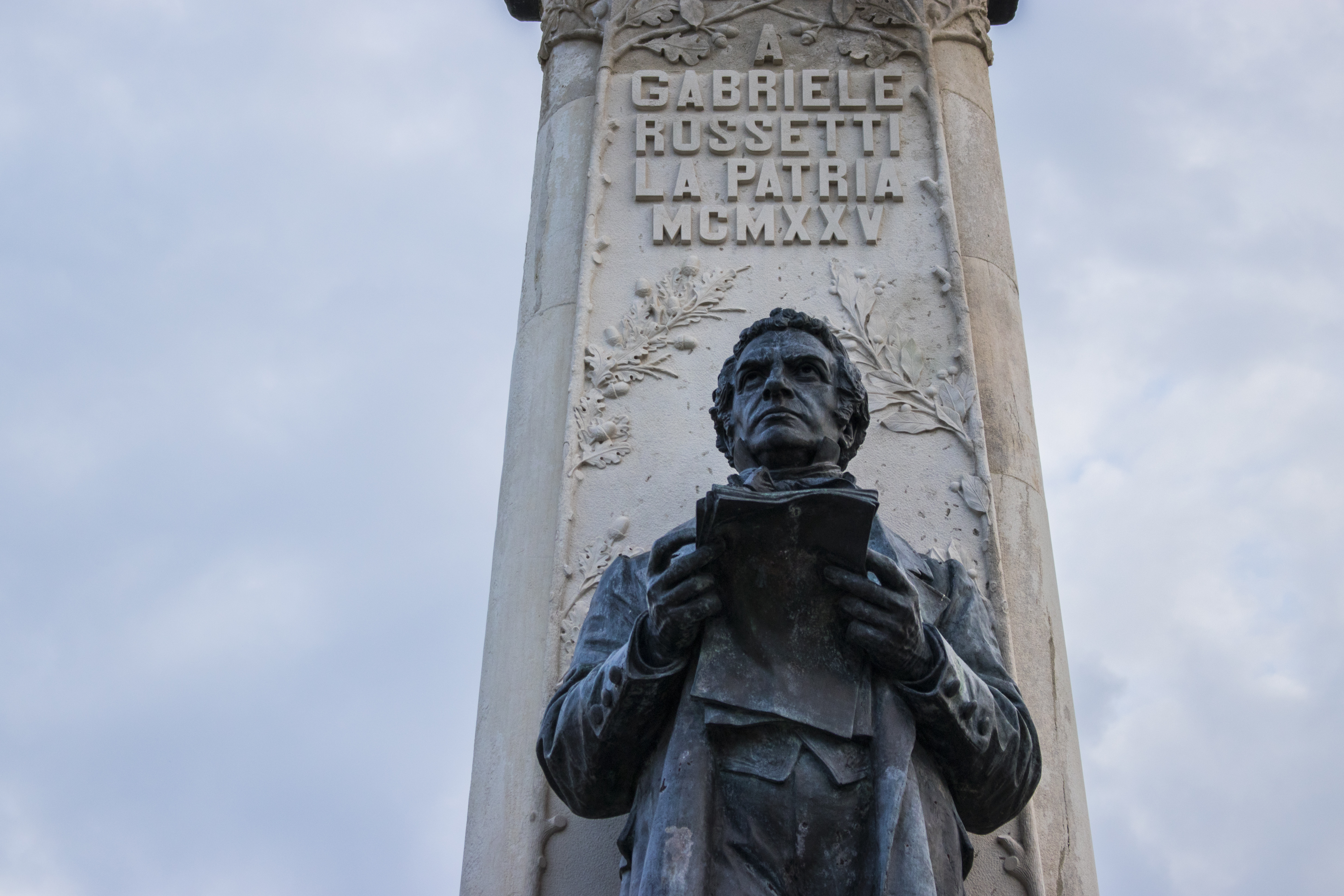
Monument to Rossetti, Vasto.

- Maria Francesca Rossetti
- Dante Gabriel Rossetti
- William Michael Rossetti
- Christina Georgina Rossetti

Rossetti died on 24 April 1854 in London, aged 71, and is buried on the western side of Highgate Cemetery, adjacent to the grave of Elizabeth Madox Brown, the first wife of Ford Madox Brown. Later burials in the Rossetti family grave are Elizabeth Siddal, wife of Dante Gabriel Rossetti (1862), Frances Rossetti, wife of Gabriele (1886), Christina Georgina Rossetti (1895) and William Michael Rossetti (1919). The ashes of four grandchildren have also been buried in the grave.

== See also ==
- Rossetti–Polidori family
