= Howard Brenton =

English playwright (born 1942)

Howard John Brenton FRSL (born 13 December 1942) is an English playwright and screenwriter, often ranked alongside contemporaries such as Edward Bond, Caryl Churchill, and David Hare.

== Early years ==
Brenton was born in Portsmouth, Hampshire, son of policeman (later Methodist minister) Donald Henry Brenton and his wife Rose Lilian (née Lewis). He was educated at Chichester High School For Boys and read English Literature at St Catharine's College, Cambridge. In 1964 he was awarded the Chancellor's Gold Medal for Poetry. While at Cambridge he wrote a play, Ladder of Fools which was performed at the ADC Theatre as a double bill with Hello-Goodbye Sebastian by John Grillo in April 1965, and at the Oxford Playhouse in June of that year. It was described by Eric Shorter of The Daily Telegraph as "Actable, gripping, murky and moody: how often can you say that of the average new play tried out in London, let alone of an undergraduate's work..." Brenton's one-act play, It's My Criminal, was performed at the Royal Court Theatre (1966).

== Career ==
In 1968 he joined the Brighton Combination as a writer and actor, and in 1969 joined Portable Theatre (founded by David Hare and Tony Bicat), for whom he wrote Christie in Love, staged in the Royal Court's Theatre Upstairs (1969) and Fruit (1970). He is also the author of Winter, Daddykins (1966), Revenge for the Royal Court Theatre Upstairs; and the triple-bill Heads, Gum & Goo and The Education of Skinny Spew (1969). These were followed by Wesley (1970); Scott of the Antarctic and A Sky-blue Life (1971); Hitler Dances, How Beautiful With Badges, and an adaptation of Measure for Measure (1972).

In 1973 Brenton and David Hare were jointly commissioned by Richard Eyre to write a "big" play for Nottingham Playhouse. "The result was Brassneck, which offered an exhilaratingly panoramic satire on England from 1945 to the present, depicting the meteoric ups and downs of a self-seeking Midlands family...from singing the Red Flag in 1945 to acting as a conduit for the Oriental drug market in the decadent Seventies." – Michael Billington (2007). Brassneck was followed a year later by Brenton's The Churchill Play, again staged by Richard Eyre at the Nottingham Playhouse (1974), another 'state of the nation play' about the growing conflict between security and liberty, opening with the image of a dead Winston Churchill rising from his catafalque in Westminster Hall. Brenton's play "offered an imaginative vision of a future in which basic human freedoms would be curtailed by the state. As so often, a dramatist saw things that others did not".

Brenton's next major success was Weapons of Happiness, about a strike in a south London factory, commissioned by the National Theatre for its new Lyttelton Theatre and the first commissioned play to be performed at its South Bank home. Staged by Hare in July 1976, it won the Evening Standard award for Best Play.

He gained notoriety for his play The Romans in Britain, first staged at the National Theatre in October 1980, which drew parallels between the Roman invasion of Britain in 54BC and the British military presence in Northern Ireland. But the politics of his play were ignored. Instead a display of moral outrage focused on a scene of attempted anal rape of a Druid priest (played by Greg Hicks), caught bathing by a Roman centurion (Peter Sproule). This resulted in a private prosecution by Mary Whitehouse against the play's director Michael Bogdanov. Whitehouse's prosecution was withdrawn by her own legal team when it became obvious that it would not succeed.

The theme of Brenton's 1985 political comedy Pravda, a collaboration with David Hare who also directed, was described by Michael Billington in The Guardian of 3 May 1985 as "the rapacious absorption of chunks of the British press by a tough South African entrepreneur, Lambert Le Roux...superbly embodied by Anthony Hopkins who utters every sentence with precise Afrikaans over-articulation as if the rest of the world are idiots." The target of the satire was generally accepted to be the Australian international newspaper proprietor Rupert Murdoch and his News International empire, but the play's main question mark was about the dangers for society and the state of monopolistic media ownership.

Brenton was elected a Fellow of the Royal Society of Literature in 2017.

== Personal life ==
He married Jane Margaret Fry in 1970. They have two sons.

== Works ==
=== Plays ===
- Ladder of Fools, Cambridge University Actors, ADC Theatre, Cambridge (1965)
- Winter, Daddykins, Lantern Theatre, Dublin (1965)
- It's My Criminal, Royal Court Theatre (1965)
- Christie in Love, Portable Theatre, Royal Court Theatre Upstairs (1969)
- Gum and Goo, Brighton Combination (1969); RSC at the Open Space Theatre (1971)
- Revenge, Royal Court Theatre Upstairs (1969)
- Heads, University of Bradford Drama Group (1969); Inter-Action at the Ambience-in-Exile Lunch Hour Theatre Club (1970)
- The Education of Skinny Spew, University of Bradford Drama Group (1969); Inter-Action at the Ambience-in-Exile Lunch Hour Theatre Club (1970)
- Fruit (1970)
- Wesley, Bradford Festival (1970)
- Scott of the Antarctic, Bradford Festival (1971)
- Hitler Dances, Traverse Theatre Workshop (1972)
- Measure for Measure (adaptation), Northcott Theatre (1972)
- Magnificence, Royal Court (1973)
- Brassneck, written with David Hare, Nottingham Playhouse (1973)
- The Churchill Play, Nottingham Playhouse (1974); revived by the RSC 1978 and 1988
- The Screens, an abridgement of Jean Genet's Les Paravents, Bristol Old Vic studio (1973)
- The Saliva Milkshake, Soho Poly Lunchtime Theatre (1975)
- Weapons of Happiness, National Theatre, Lyttelton (1976); winner of the Evening Standard award 1976; revived by the Finborough Theatre, 2008
- Epsom Downs, Joint Stock Theatre Company (1977)
- Deeds, written with Trevor Griffiths, Ken Campbell, and David Hare, Nottingham Playhouse (1978)
- Sore Throats, RSC Donmar Warehouse (1978)
- The Life of Galileo, translation from Bertolt Brecht, National Theatre, Olivier (August 1980)
- The Romans in Britain, National Theatre, Olivier (October 1980)
- A Short Sharp Shock, written with Tony Howard, Royal Court at the Theatre Royal Stratford East (1980)
- Thirteenth Night, RSC Donmar Warehouse (1981)
- Danton's Death, translation from Georg Büchner, National Theatre, Olivier (July 1982)
- Conversations in Exile, adapted from Brecht, Foco Novo (1982)
- The Genius, Royal Court (1983)
- Sleeping Policemen, written with Tunde Ikoli, Foco Novo, Hemel Hempstead then Royal Court (1983)
- Bloody Poetry, Foco Novo, Hampstead Theatre (1984); Royal Court (1987)
- Pravda, written with David Hare, National Theatre, Olivier (1985); winner of the Evening Standard Award 1985
- Greenland, Royal Court (1988)
- H.I.D. (Hess is Dead), RSC, Almeida Theatre (1989)
- Iranian Nights with Tariq Ali, Royal Court (1989)
- Moscow Gold with Tariq Ali, RSC Barbican Theatre (1990)
- Berlin Bertie, Royal Court (1992)
- Faust Parts 1 and 2, translation from Johann Wolfgang von Goethe, RSC Swan Theatre, Stratford-upon-Avon (September 1995); RSC The Pit (September 1996)
- Ugly Rumours, with Tariq Ali, Tricycle Theatre (1998)
- Collateral Damage with Tariq Ali and Andy de la Tour, Tricycle Theatre (1999)
- Snogging Ken with Tariq Ali and Andy de la Tour, Almeida Theatre (2000)
- Kit's Play, RADA Jerwood Theatre, (2000)
- Paul, National Theatre, Cottesloe (November 2005) , Olivier nomination for Best Play
- In Extremis, Shakespeare's Globe (2006) , revived 2007
- Never So Good, National Theatre, Lyttelton (2008)
- Anne Boleyn, Shakespeare's Globe (2010)
- Danton's Death, National Theatre, Olivier (2010), a translation from Georg Büchner
- The Ragged Trousered Philanthropists, Liverpool Everyman and Chichester Festival Theatre (2010)
- 55 Days, Hampstead Theatre (2012)
- AIWW: The Arrest of Ai Weiwei, Hampstead Theatre (2013)
- Drawing the Line, Hampstead Theatre (2013)
- Doctor Scroggy's War, Shakespeare's Globe (2014)
- Ransomed, Salisbury Playhouse (2015)
- Lawrence After Arabia, Chichester Festival Theatre (2016)
- The Shadow Factory, NST City Theatre, at the University of Southampton, (2018)
- Jude, Hampstead Theatre (2018)
- Cancelling Socrates (2022)
- Churchill in Moscow, Orange Tree Theatre (2025)

=== Libretto ===
- Playing Away, libretto for Ben Mason's football opera, Opera North and Munich Biennale (1994); revived Bregenz Festival (2007)

=== Radio ===
- Nasser's Eden (1998)

=== Screenplays ===
- Lushly (1972)
- The Saliva Milkshake, BBC (1975)
- The Paradise Run, Thames TV (1976)
- Desert of Lies, BBC Play for Today (1984)
- Dead Head, BBC 4-part series (1986)
- Spooks, BBC drama series (2002–2005), fourteen episodes; BAFTA Best Drama Series 2003
  - "Traitor's Gate"
  - "The Rose Bed Memoirs"
  - "Mean, Dirty, Nasty" (with David Wolstencroft)
  - "Nest of Angels"
  - "Blood & Money"
  - "I Spy Apocalypse"
  - "Smoke & Mirrors"
  - "Project Friendly Fire"
  - "The Sleeper"
  - "Who Guards the Guards" (with Rupert Walters)
  - "Celebrity"
  - "Road Trip"
  - "The Russian"
  - "Diana"

=== Books ===
- Diving for Pearls (novel), Nick Hern Books (1989) ISBN 978-1-85459-025-1
- Hot Irons (diaries, essays, journalism), Nick Hern Books (1995) ISBN 1-85459-123-1; reissued in an expanded version, Methuen (1998)

== Awards ==
- Evening Standard Award for –
  - Best Play 1976, for Weapons of Happiness
  - Best Play 1985, for Pravda
- Whatsonstage.com Theatregoers' Choice Award for best new play 2011, for Anne Boleyn

== Sources ==
- The Second Wave by John Russell Taylor, Methuen 1978 reprint
- Who's Who in the Theatre, 17th Edition, Gale (1981)
- Brenton: Plays One, Methuen 1986 ISBN 0-413-40430-7
- Theatre Record and its annual Indexes
- Howard Brenton's CV for Never So Good RNT programme 2008
