= The Fifth Queen =

Trilogy of novels by Ford Madox Ford

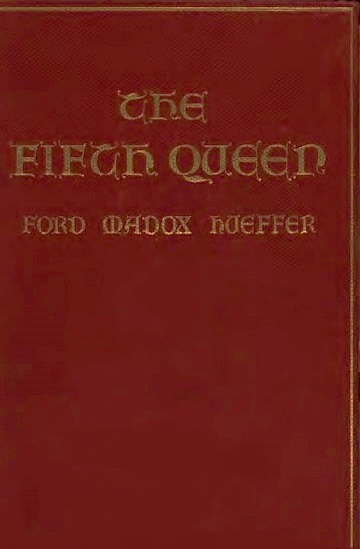
- Cover of The Fifth Queen
- Author: Ford Madox Ford
- Original title: The Fifth Queen: And How She Came To Court (Book One of a Trilogy)
- Cover artist: Unknown
- Language: English
- Series: Trilogy
- Subject: Katharine Howard
- Genre: Historical
- Publisher: Alston Rivers, Nash, Vintage Classics
- Publication date: 1906–1908 (original),
- Publication place: United Kingdom
- English publication date: 4 October 2011
- Media type: Print (hardback, original no longer in print), print (paperback, republished)
- Pages: 324
- ISBN: 0307744914; 978-0307744913

The Fifth Queen is trilogy of historical novels by English novelist Ford Madox Ford comprising The Fifth Queen: And How She Came to Court (1906), Privy Seal (1907), and The Fifth Queen Crowned (1908). It presents a highly fictionalised account of Katharine Howard's arrival at the Court of Henry VIII, her eventual marriage to the king, and her death.

== Plot summary ==
The Fifth Queen trilogy has an omniscient narrator. Katharine Howard is introduced in the first book as a devout Roman Catholic, impoverished, young noblewoman escorted by her fiery cousin Thomas Culpeper. By accident, she comes to the attention of the king, in a minor way at first, is helped to a position as a lady in waiting for the then bastard the Lady Mary, Henry's eldest daughter, by her old Latin tutor Nicholas Udall. Udal is a spy for Thomas Cromwell, the Lord Privy Seal.

As Katharine becomes involved with the many calculating, competing, and spying members of Henry VIII's Court, she gradually rises, almost against her will, in Court. She is brought more to the attention of the King, becomes involved with him, is used by Cromwell, Bishop Gardiner and Thomas Cranmer as well as the less powerful though more personally attached Nicholas Throckmorton. Her connection to the latter puts her in some peril, as in January 1554 he is suspected of complicity in Wyatt's Rebellion and arrested, during which time Katherine is also briefly implicated.

Katharine's forthrightness, devotion to the Old Faith and learning are what make her attractive to the King, along with her youth and physical beauty. This is in direct contradiction to the way historians view the historical personage herself; that is, as a flighty and flirtatious young woman with few other redeeming qualities.

== Historical accuracy and as a work of historical fiction ==
William Gass states, in the afterword to the 1986 edition, that Ford takes great liberties with historical evidence, even into the improbable, inventing much of the dialogue and settings. He concludes that the writing is more to "entertain, rather than instruct, his readers."

== Style ==
The main strengths of this trilogy are considered by many writer admirers and critics – notably Graham Greene, Alan Judd and William Gass – to be its impressionistic qualities, its creation of a believable approximation of Tudor English and its successful creation of atmosphere.

One critic stated that it was clearly a work of literary fiction, inescapable, and should be avoided by any reader who prefers a more opaque style.

Graham Greene has written that "in The Fifth Queen Ford tries out the impressionist method." He likens the King to a "shadow" with the story focusing on the struggle between Katharine and Cromwell. He raises the question of whether the King's lighting is more like a stage production than novel, again alluding to a fictionalisation rather than truly historical style.

Alan Judd, in his 1991 biography of the author, states that this version does not "hinder the sense of reality" in its effective style portraying a contrivance of Tudor English. He likens the author's dialogue to poetry.

== Cinematic qualities ==
In book's 1986 edition afterword, William Gass writes that it is "like Eisenstein's Ivan: slow, intense, pictorial, and operatic." He also associates the writing with art.

In his biography of the author, Alan Judd also compares it to a film in how it creates "static scenes" that suggest "power, fear, sex, longing, guile and fate."

== Critical assessment of achievement ==
Joseph Conrad described it as "the swansong of the historical romance".

Ford biographer Judd writes: "This is the first of Ford's books of which one can say with reasonable confidence that, if he had written nothing else, it would still have a good chance of being in print today", and that it is a masterpiece of its kind (historical fiction).

On the back cover, Greene concludes that this may be one of Ford's "three great novels" (The Fifth Queen trilogy, The Good Soldier, and Parade's End) that may stand the test of time "compared with most of the work of his successors."

== Collected editions ==
- The Bodley Head Ford Madox Ford: Vol. 2: The Fifth Queen; Privy Seal; The Fifth Queen Crowned (1962) eds. Graham Greene and Michael Killgrew, London: Bodley Head.
- The Fifth Queen (1963) With an Introduction by Graham Greene, New York: The Vanguard Press.
- The Fifth Queen (1986) With an Afterword by William Gass, New York: The Ecco Press.
- The Fifth Queen (1999) With an Introduction by A.S. Byatt, London: Penguin.
