= The Nature of a Crime =

1909 story by Joseph Conrad and Ford Madox Ford

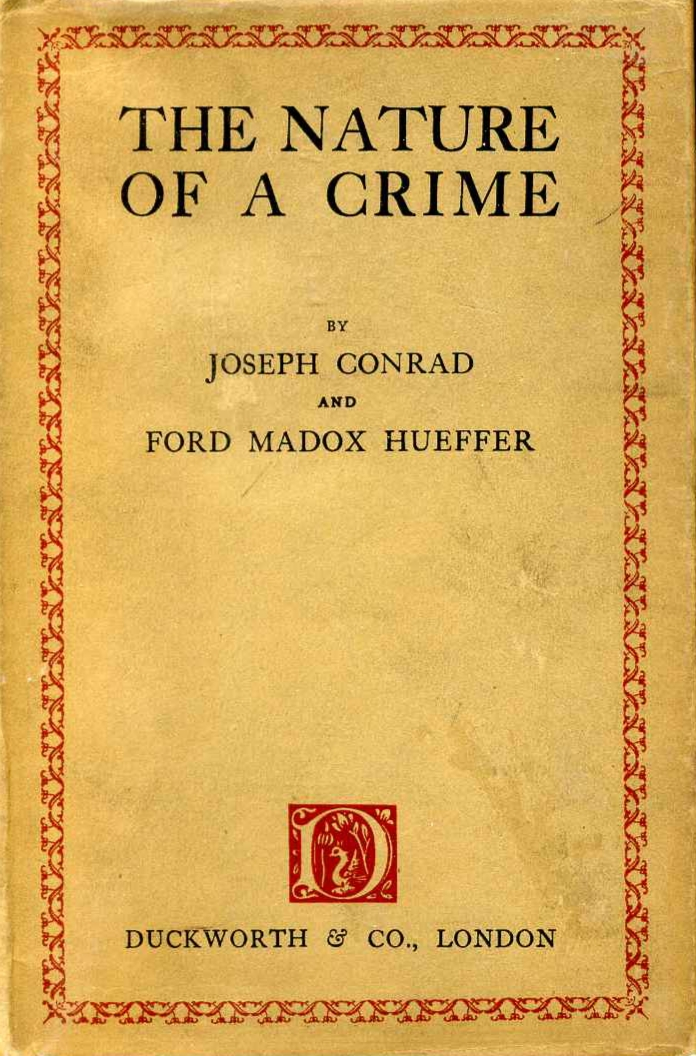
First edition (publ. Duckworth & Co.)

The Nature of a Crime is a collaborative short story written and published in 1909 by authors Joseph Conrad and Ford Madox Ford. The text did not acquire acclaim until after Conrad's death in 1924, when Ford brought the text to light in his essay "Joseph Conrad: A Personal Remembrance". The Nature of a Crime is the last of three books written by Conrad and Ford.

== Literary and historical context ==
The text was written by Ford and Conrad in 1909, eight years after their earliest collaboration. Prior to the creation of this story, Ford and Conrad shared an extensive working relationship, both as editors and co-authors. The two co-wrote The Inheritors in 1901, followed by Romance in 1903, and finally The Nature of a Crime in 1909. The two were introduced to one another by Edward Garnett, who wished Conrad would edit a text Ford had written in order to increase its likelihood of being published. The working relationship between the two was very helpful for each author in developing personal theories of the story, the writing process, and the separation of the author from the narrator. Ford and Conrad's close work over the years also created a strong bond between the two, summarized in Ford's 1924 essay, "Joseph Conrad: A Personal Remembrance", published in The English Review.

The Nature of a Crime is likely influenced by major events from the life of Joseph Conrad, most notably his suicide attempt made at the age of 20. In the story, the narrator finds himself falling deeper into depression as a result of his mishandling of a close friend's trust fund, and is eventually pushed to the point of acceptance of suicide as the only viable option for him to rectify the situation. Conrad's real-life attempt on his life, while not well-documented, is reported to have been a result of falling into debt, similar to the narrator in his story. The story also references Tristan and Iseult, a medieval French tragedy about adulterous love. The story's narrator mentions in one of his letters that he has gone to see a performance of the play. The influence of this traditional story is evident in the story, as the narrator finds himself writing love letters to the wife of a friend - an action that the narrator acknowledges as improper, further adding to the storm of depression he experiences as a result of his personal actions.

== Plot summary ==
This work is written in the form of a series of letters from a narrator, who remains nameless throughout the work, to a particular love interest, also left nameless. The narrator is employed as a lawyer, a fact deduced by his reference to his position of holding power of attorney over a few characters in the work. The crime for which he is responsible is that of gambling away money entrusted to him by one of his clients, Edward Burden, who is to be married some time within the occurrence of the story's events. However, the conflict of the story is that Edward has no idea of the narrator's misuse of his funds, and that the funds are not so destroyed that Edward cannot withdraw what he needs in the short term.

The bulk of the work details the internal struggles of the narrator to come to grips with the crime he has committed and for which he imminently will be indicted. His letters, while acting as a confession of his love for the unidentified married woman, also act as a device for him to express the otherwise concealed emotions with which he struggles in the daily process of figuring out how to deal with his situation. The narrator posits several theories about life, including man's relationship with “the omniscient,” or God; the ways in which men and women interact, and his opinions on female empowerment; and, most importantly, his opinions on suicide. At the start of the work, the narrator mentions frequently that his time on Earth is limited, and reveals later in the story that his intention is to commit suicide. For nearly an entire chapter, he details the moral implications and justifications of suicide, believing that his life has nothing left to offer, due to both the inability to be with the woman he loves and his impending sentence of indefinite imprisonment (another critical factor in setting his mind on suicide is his refusal to withstand imprisonment, which he cites as “the worst form of torture” because of the solitary existence of man with only his thoughts). The narrator plans to make his final living act the mailing of his letters to the woman, but the story offers a rather comic ending to the story - as the narrator plans to die in some way on his way home, he experiences overwhelming marvel at the simplest occurrences of life (for example, a milk man delivering milk and being chased by a cat), and is granted “reprieve” from his situation in that Burden and his fiancée have planned a year-long honeymoon, granting the narrator time to remedy the accounts and set things straight.

== Main characters ==
- Narrator - The protagonist of the story, though his name is never revealed. His employment by the Burden family as their attorney opens him to using Edward's money to make personal investments, which cause him to drown deeper and deeper into debt that was incurred using someone else's money. The narrator is the author of the letters sent to a distant love interest, who also remains nameless throughout the text. Throughout his letters, he expresses emotion about his abuse of trust from the Burden family, and also offers theories on how men come to the point of suicide and various rationalizations for completing such an act. The narrator can easily be interpreted as a deific character, as his presence in the story is known but not necessarily tangible. Edward Burden holds the narrator in very high esteem, despite his continual efforts to push that thought from Burden's mind.
- Burden family - Alexander Burden and his wife (unnamed), parents of Edward, provide much of the context for the conflict in the story. Their employment and eventual entrustment of Edward's bank accounts to the narrator create the bond between the two. When Alexander and his wife pass away, the narrator is left as the principal influential force in Edward's life.
- Edward Burden - The most influential character on the events of the story. The narrator has power of attorney over Edward, and Edward holds him in very high regard, almost to the point of a deity. The narrator acknowledges the level of respect Edward has for him, and adamantly disputes the validity of Edward's belief. Edward's persistent view of the narrator as a character of merit adds to the internal depression felt by the narrator as he decimates Edward's funds for his own use.
- Miss Annie Averie - Edward's fiancée. While relatively minor in comparison to the primary relationships in the story, Averies may serve as a point of discussion for the perception of women and gender roles in the early 20th century. Her relationship with Edward indicates a more 19th-century view of the male-female relationship, as Edward often tries to exert his authority and force her into subservience, at one point noting in conversation with the narrator that he had already begun "taming" her in preparation for their marital life. The narrator is, in his letters, often critical of Edward for his desire to hold total control over his fiancée, but never reveals these feelings to him directly. The narrator occasionally notes in his letters that he would cater to the "tiniest vanity" of Miss Averies - either asserting his legitimate belief in requiting the service and love of the woman in a relationship, or simply trying to further woo his love interest as he becomes increasingly desperate for her affection.

== Genre and style ==
The Nature of a Crime is a collaborative text, written and edited jointly by both Joseph Conrad and Ford Madox Ford, one of three such texts that exist. It is broken down into eight chapters, each detailing a day in which the narrator finds time to write another installment to his love interest (this being evidenced by the continual decrease in time until the narrator's death date in each section). While it could be considered a drama or crime-fiction work, the story has a much more introspective framework after the initial frame of the crime is revealed. As the narrator writes more, the work focuses more and more on the internal conflicts, justifications, and rationalizations of a man set out to take his own life.

The text, while written under a single voice, was edited extensively by both authors - as each of their individual introductions assert, the final work was influenced heavily by both, and written essentially in complete collaboration; that is, the work is a result almost entirely of conversation between both its authors. The story focuses heavily on moral issues, a possible projection of the details of Conrad and Ford's conversations into the literary realm. As seen in other works, particularly written by Conrad, the subject matter of this story delves deep into the recesses of the nature of man and the rationalization of action and thought, allowing the story to almost transcend genre and be classified as an introspective work.

== Themes ==
The story concerns itself primarily with internal issues of man, on a wide-ranging set of subjects. An overarching theme is that of death - as a man who, for almost the entirety of the story, is doomed to die, the narrator offers several opinions on what it means to die, and why the idea of death satisfies him. He explains his reasonings on choosing death over imprisonment, calling himself a “man of action” (opposed to a “man of thought,” his other classification for people) - that death provides the basis for some new adventure something yet to have been experienced by man. As a man of experiences, he finds reason in excusing himself from an otherwise sinful act, being that nothing is known about truly experiencing death.

The story also details beliefs on gender relations in society. The narrator is highly critical of Edward Burden's treatment of his fiancée, Annie, noting frequently that she to him is some sort of beast to be tamed. The narrator criticizes Edward's attempt to simplify Annie's desires and beliefs, expressing in opposition that, were he to marry her, he would “try to find out what was her tiny vanity” (27) and see to it that she was satisfied in it. As this text was published (and most likely originally written) after the turn of the 20th century, these sentiments toward females may oppose earlier writings by Conrad and his 19th-century contemporaries - an expression of the change in opinion that all were capable of free thinking and were entitled to their own passions, regardless of prior social constructs.

Overall, the story presents the theme of moral discourse. In nearly each individual section, the narrator discusses a different facet of life affected by his present moral conflict. The narrator, while not necessarily holding faith in God, subscribes to the theory of asceticism, defined as “the doctrine that states one can achieve a high moral state by practicing self-denial or self-mortification.” This philosophy may justify his decision and argument that suicide is his best option - denial of the irredeemable nature of his crime and the act of suicide itself hint at his opinions throughout the story that only through suicide will he be able to achieve the relinquishing of his earthly torment.

== Critical reception ==
Due to its posthumous publishing and relative insignificance in relation to other works by both authors, The Nature of a Crime has received very little scholarly examination. As the text is both fairly short in length and written by multiple authors, it poses difficulty to those looking to attribute certain characteristics to an author or in interpreting sections of text and their relation to the personal lives of the authors. Another struggle in critically interpreting the text is its epistemological nature - rather than creating a narrative about European colonialism as was popular at the time, this text is fairly modern in that it focuses entirely on the internal struggles of an individual as opposed to creating a detailed history of colonialism. One academic field in which this story is found influential is that of the theory of writing and of the story. Meyer's article, entitled The Nature of a Text refers to Conrad and Ford's work as "a fictive construct that stages writing as a self-reflexive textual act," referencing the text as a landmark in that it implies the coexistence and co-occurrence of the actions of writing and reading.

While very little critical reception of The Nature of a Crime exists, Joseph Conrad is one of the most celebrated authors of the late 19th and early 20th century, with significant interpretation and criticism of his other texts available. William Teignmouth Shore noted in his account of an interview with Conrad in the early 1900s that "it is almost impossible to entirely understand a man's work without knowing something of the man." Conrad's personality and history significantly influences the writing of this story, both in the literal application of his debt and subsequent suicide attempt, and also in its subject matter - the deep, often introspective concepts discussed in the story likely come from discussions Conrad had on those same subjects, especially with his co-author, Ford.
