= The Road to Romance =

1927 film by John S. Robertson

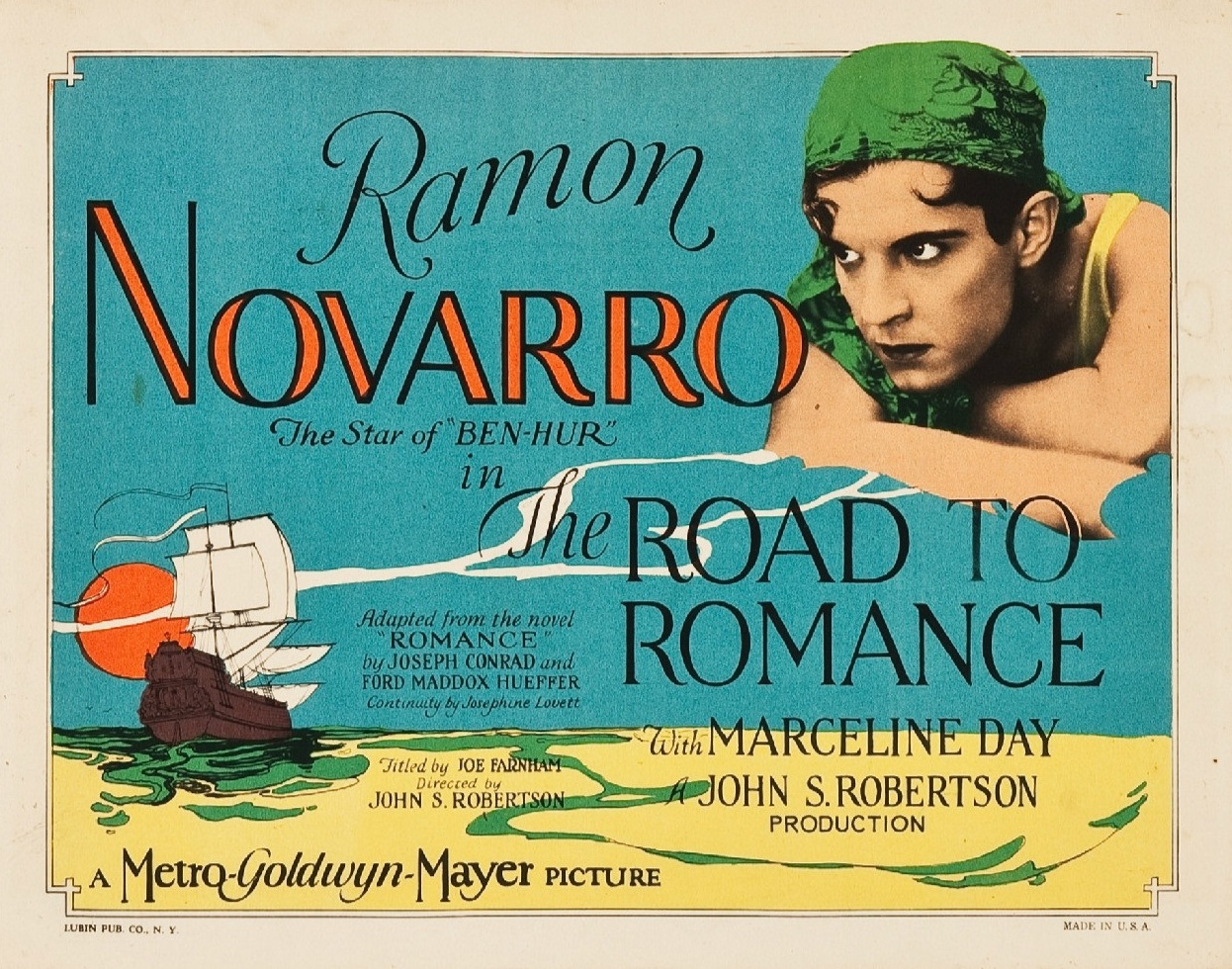
- Lobby card
- Directed by: John S. Robertson
- Written by: Josephine Lovett
- Based on: Romance by Joseph Conrad and Ford Madox Ford
- Starring: Ramon Novarro
- Cinematography: Oliver T. Marsh
- Distributed by: Metro-Goldwyn-Mayer
- Release date: October 9, 1927
- Running time: 7 reels
- Country: United States
- Language: Silent (English intertitles)

The Road to Romance is a 1927 American silent action film directed by John S. Robertson, based upon the 1903 Joseph Conrad-Ford Madox Ford novel Romance. A copy of the film survives at the New Zealand Film Archive.

== Plot ==
Serafina (Marceline Day) is captured by Don Balthasar (Roy D'Arcy)'s pirates on a Caribbean island, when José Armando (Ramon Novarro) arrives from Spain to the rescue.

== Cast ==
- Ramon Novarro as José Armando
- Marceline Day as Serafina
- Marc McDermott as Pópolo
- Roy D'Arcy as Don Balthasar
- Cesare Gravina as Castro
- Jules Cowles as Smoky Beard
- John George
- Bobbie Mack as Drunkard (credited as Bobby Mack)
- Otto Matieson as Don Carlos (credited as Otto Matiesen)
