= The Good Soldier (1981 film) =

1981 British television film

- Based on: The Good Soldier by Ford Madox Ford
- Screenplay by: Julian Mitchell
- Directed by: Kevin Billington
- Music by: John McCabe
- Country of origin: United Kingdom
- Original language: English

Production
- Producer: Peter Eckersley
- Cinematography: Tony Pierce-Roberts
- Editor: Edward Mansell
- Running time: 105 minutes
- Production company: Granada Television

Original release
- Network: ITV
- Release: 15 April 1981

The Good Soldier is a 1981 British television drama film directed by Kevin Billington, starring Robin Ellis, Vickery Turner, Jeremy Brett and Susan Fleetwood. It tells the story of two couples that fall apart due to lies and infidelity. The film is based on the 1915 novel of the same name by Ford Madox Ford. It was produced by Granada Television.

== Synopsis ==
John and Florence Dowells, and the aristocratically English Edward and Leonora Ashburnham, met regularly in a small German spa town for nine years. Then the stable and civilized pattern of their lives is broken under the impact of a series of events and revelations.

== Cast ==
- Robin Ellis as John Dowell
- Vickery Turner as Florence Dowell
- Jeremy Brett as Edward Ashburnham
- Susan Fleetwood as Leonora Ashburnham
- Elizabeth Garvie as Nancy Rufford
- Pauline Moran as Maisie Maidan
- John Ratzenberger as Jimmy
- Geoffrey Chater as Bagshawe
- John Grillo as Herr Schontz
- Roger Hammond as Grand Duke

== Release ==
The Good Soldier premiered on British television in 1981. It was broadcast on the American network PBS in 1983 as an episode of the series Masterpiece Theatre.

== Reception ==
In a contemporary review, the New York Times wrote the series was "adapted beautifully" and "it has been transposed to the television screen splendidly... This is a powerfully intelligent and insightful work." In a 2015 review of the book, Kevin T. Di Camillo called the adaptation "pretty forgettable".
