= No More Parades =

No More Parades may refer to:

- No More Parades (novel), a novel by Ford Madox Ford
- "No More Parades," a song by Son Volt from their 1997 album Straightaways
