= A Man Could Stand Up — =

1926 novel by Ford Madox Ford

- First UK edition
- Author: Ford Madox Ford
- Series: Parade's End
- Publisher: A. & C. Boni (US); Duckworth (UK)
- Publication date: 1926
- OCLC: 1023520
- Preceded by: No More Parades
- Followed by: Last Post

A Man Could Stand Up — is the third novel of Ford Madox Ford's highly regarded sequence of four novels known collectively as Parade's End. It was first published in 1926.

== Summary ==
A Man Could Stand Up — is the climax of the series, though it is volume 3. It opens on Armistice Day, November 11, 1918, in Valentine Wannop’s school, and the three chapters which make up the first Part are punctuated by fireworks exploding and the celebrations taking place in the surrounding streets. Valentine is on the telephone, having been called away from her duties as a physical instructor. It is around 11 a.m., and the excessive background noise means she cannot hear who it is on the phone. It eventually transpires that Edith Ethel Duchemin (now Lady Macmaster) is informing her that Christopher Tietjens is in London once more and in need of help. It is a tortuous conversation. Edith Ethel is malicious, and has managed to link Valentine’s name compromisingly with Tietjens’ in an earlier part of her conversation – which she had with her headmistress. By the end of this call, and the other conversation in Part I (between Valentine and the Head) we have been reminded of significant events from Some Do Not . . ., as well as of the characters of those involved. Valentine has also reflected on her place in what is now the after-war world, and decided that if he still wants her she will attach herself, for good or ill, to Christopher, whom she loves.

Part II shifts time and place dramatically, returning us to the front on a morning in April, 1918. Tietjens is enjoying a brief period of calm, and a conversation with his sergeant, but soon, the noises of war begin. The bombardments which take place in this novel are perhaps less bloody and desperate than in No More Parades, though Tietjens does remember at one point the terrible death of O9 Morgan. Up to and even including the final explosive scene, with one notable exception, Tietjens’ emotional and psychological responses under fire are also subject to a greater sense of an evolving character. Ford, against the background of high tension, is carefully setting out the ways in which his hero will change. From the start of Part II the process is in train which culminates in Tietjens’ own declaration as to his place in the post-war world: he will retreat from his professional and personal encumbrances in order to live with Valentine and sell antiques to make a living.

Part III of A Man Could Stand Up — begins as Valentine comes to Gray's Inn in order to meet Christopher. Mrs Wannop, Valentine’s mother, and wife of Christopher’s father’s oldest friend, finds out, and seeks to prevent them becoming lovers. She telephones them, appealing to them both in different, highly manipulative, ways. While she talks to Tietjens, Valentine begins to learn about his war experiences as men from his unit arrive, honouring their promises to look him up; Tietjens, meanwhile, has confessed something of his continuing psychological and emotional terrors to Mrs Wannop. The drunken celebration and dance which ensues contains within it all the tensions of the inter-relationships between the men, as well as their combined experiences. Valentine finds herself thinking of Sylvia Tietjens more than once. The energy of the dance is compelling, and, a microcosm of Armistice Day, it draws volume 3 of Parade's End to a close.
