= Kevin Billington =

British film director (1934–2021)

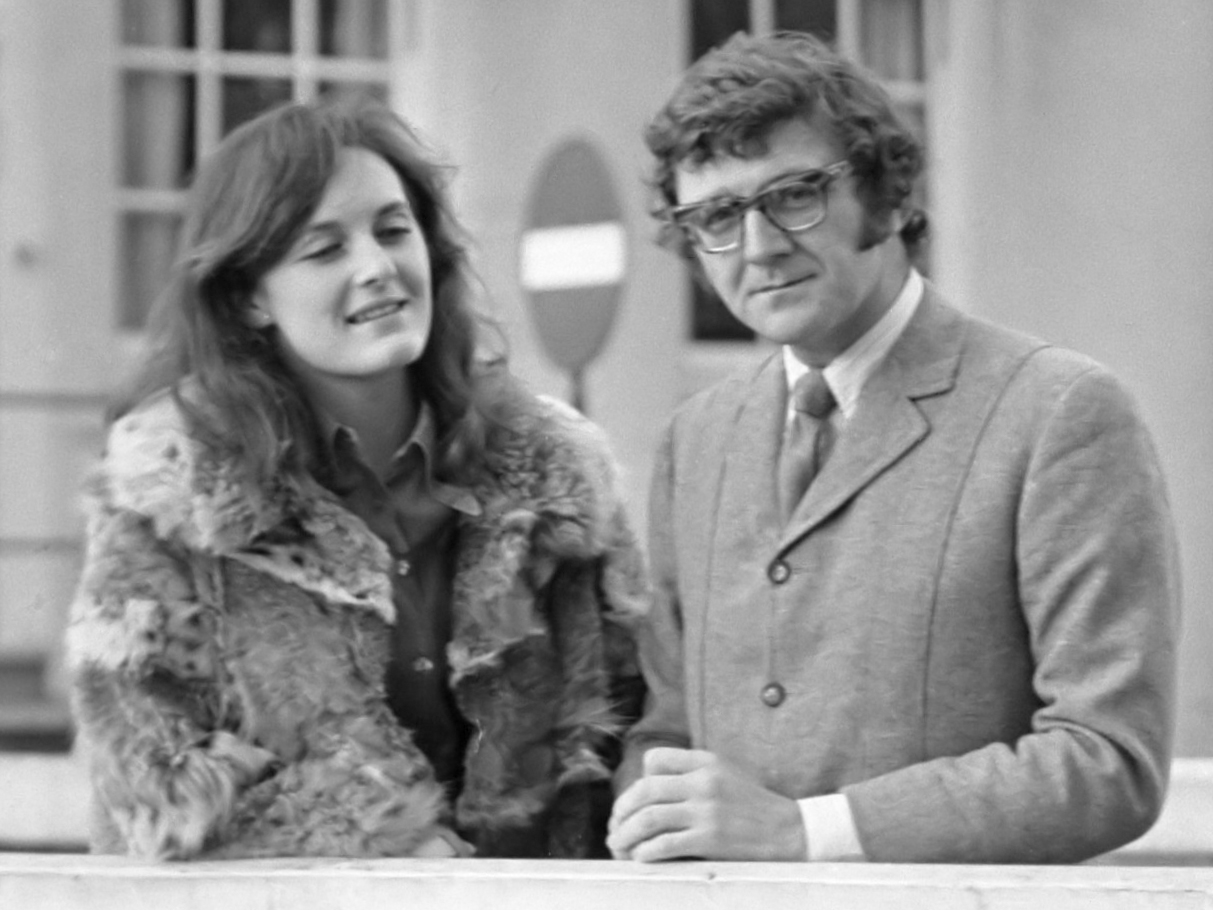
- Billington and his wife Rachel in 1968
- Born: 12 June 1934
- Died: 13 December 2021 (aged 87)
- Education: Queens' College, Cambridge
- Occupation: Film/theatre director
- Spouse: Lady Rachel Pakenham (m. 1967)
- Children: 4

Kevin Billington (12 June 1934 – 13 December 2021) was a British film director, who worked in the theatre, film and television from the 1960s.

== Biography ==
The son of a factory worker, and educated at Bryanston School and Queens' College, Cambridge, early in his career he worked for the BBC as a radio producer in Leeds (1959–60) and then for television in Manchester (1960–61) before working on the early evening Tonight and on documentaries for the BBC and ATV until 1967. Billington's films include The Rise and Rise of Michael Rimmer (1970), which stars Peter Cook, while his theatre work includes several productions of plays by Harold Pinter, who was married to his wife's sister, Lady Antonia Fraser.

Billington's television work includes Henry VIII (1979) for the BBC Television Shakespeare project, one of the best received productions in the series. He also directed The Good Soldier (Granada 1981), based on the novel by Ford Madox Ford, and A Time to Dance (BBC 1992), adapted by Melvyn Bragg from his own work of fiction.

He was married to Lady Rachel Billington; having met while they were both working in New York, they married the following year in 1967. The couple had four children and five grandchildren.

Billington died from cancer on 13 December 2021, at the age of 87.

== Filmography as director ==
- Whicker; Down Mexico Way (TV documentary, 1963)
- Mary McCarthy's Paris (TV documentary, 1964)
- A Few Castles in Spain (TV documentary, 1966)
- Interlude (1968)
- The Rise and Rise of Michael Rimmer (1970)
- The Light at the Edge of the World (1971)
- And No One Could Save Her (TV, 1973)
- Voices (1973)
- Henry VIII (TV, 1979)
- The Jail Diary of Albie Sachs (TV, 1981)
- The Good Soldier (TV, 1981)
- Outside Edge (TV, 1982)
- Reflections (1984)
- The Deliberate Death of a Polish Priest (TV, 1986)
- Heartland (TV, 1989)
- A Time to Dance (TV series, 1992)
