= The Inheritors (Conrad and Ford novel) =

1901 quasi–science fiction novel

The Inheritors: An Extravagant Story
- First US edition
- Author: Ford Madox Ford and Joseph Conrad
- Language: English
- Publisher: William Heinemann (UK); McClure, Phillips and Company (US)
- Publication date: 1901
- Publication place: United Kingdom
- Media type: Print (hardback and paperback)
- Pages: 324 pp
- OCLC: 365183

The Inheritors: An Extravagant Story (1901) is a quasi-science fiction novel on which Joseph Conrad and Ford Madox Ford (writing as Ford M. Heuffer) collaborated. Written before the first World War, its themes of corruption and the effect of the 20th century on British aristocracy were prescient. It was first published in London by William Heinemann and later the same year in New York by McClure, Phillips and Company.

In the novel, the metaphor of the "fourth dimension" is used to explain a societal shift from a generation of people who have traditional values of interdependence, being overtaken by a modern generation who believe in expediency, callously using political power to bring down the old order. Its narrator is an aspiring writer who himself makes a similar transition at a personal level only to feel he has lost everything.

== Plot introduction ==
The inheritors are a breed of cold materialists, calling themselves Fourth Dimensionists, whose task is to occupy the earth. Arthur, an unsuccessful English writer, meets a fascinating woman by chance, who seems to talk in metaphors. She claims to be from the Fourth Dimension and a major player in a plan to "inherit the earth". They go their separate ways with her pledge they will meet again and again.

At their next meeting, the woman freely reveals her "identity" and two others in their circle, one a cabinet minister (Charles Gurnard) and Fox, the editor of a new paper – all of them competing with each other. She has taken on his name and pretends to be his sister, invading firstly his down-on-their-luck aristocratic family by financing improvements to their estate, until she moves with his aunt, to Paris. Each time she turns up, she is in greater connection with prominent political people and appears more dazzlingly beautiful and more desirable to Arthur.

== Plot summary ==
The authors introduce the story through science fiction tropes such as the uncanny – coincidences, ESP, unearthly lighting effects, distorted visions, supernatural aural frequencies and scenes dissolving into another – pointing to the underlying threat of instability that drives the novel. The story is told through the eyes of Arthur, a writer turned journalist who feels he is compromising his art. Although Arthur at first holds to high ideals (he values "literature" over journalism, sacrificial literary types over opportunists), he gradually moves away from them because he wants to be a somebody.

After first compromising his work, and obsessed with the woman, he is seduced into thinking that he has a chance with her. He further believes he has a choice between being phased out without making his mark or being "one of them", one of the inner circle who inherits power along with Them. She precisely chooses him for his weaknesses: his sense of failure and impotence as a writer with a need for significance; his isolation and willingness to join society; his snobbery and openness to flattering attention. While her reasons for bringing Arthur into play are not clear at first, they are complex. Inevitably Arthur is her tool for bringing down her opponent. For the authors, Arthur serves as an observer and an experiment at the hands of the Dimensionists, proving their effectiveness on an individual's psyche.

The story is a Machiavellian labyrinth involving the British Government's tenuous support for a railway baron, a bid to annex Greenland, and a tilt at party leadership. Themes of unrealised potential, the cold-blooded manoeuvering, and the upward climb of the influential mystery woman, fictionalise the intricacies and interactions of class and power in Britain at the time. Two contrasting mindsets of society are delineated by generational values or lack of them and the changes they portend for the everyday people they effectively rule.

By chance Arthur is offered a job writing "atmospheric" pieces for a new journal put together by an editor (Fox), a well-respected writer (Callan) and the Foreign Minister (Edward Churchill). Although Fox is a Fourth Dimensionist, his group represents the more humanitarian version of the Dimension threesome. Arthur is to write about celebrities. In this way, and through his own sense of superiority and lack of sympathy for others, he is drawn into the machinery of politics and the players who aim to inherit the earth. Although he frequently thinks of ways to expose their plan and tries to warn others such as his aunt and Churchill against the woman and Them, he is outwitted. As her brother, people see it as sibling rivalry, contaminated by jealousy, and ambition. His every move outmatched, Arthur lapses into passivity on that front. Instead he tries to win her favour.

Using the ploy of hinting that she cares, the woman leads Arthur into believing there's hope if he can impress her. The ailing and exhausted Fox admits his own defeated position, trusting him with editorial power for a few hours. The climax comes when Arthur has the chance to insert an article that would avert history, to stop the presses at The Hour. But with a desire to show how much he is like her kind, to earn her favour, he decides not to. He learns to his dismay that he did just what he was meant to do, undermine Fox – Gurnard's opponent – that he never had a place in her scheme, and has betrayed anyone who would have meant anything to him, such as Churchill, Callan and Fox. Learning she is marrying a triumphant Gurnard, realising there is no going back and no future for him, he has a minor breakdown at his Club, where people speak of him as "the one they got at".

== Textual notes ==
The Inheritors contains the themes that preoccupied both its authors in their respective bodies of work. Themes of universality and the corruptibility of human nature, loneliness, isolation, self-deception, and the outworkings of a character's flaws are signatures found throughout most of Joseph Conrad's writings. In Ford Madox Ford's work, both The Good Soldier and Parade's End published much later, the author depicts a long undisturbed English aristocracy confused and bewildered by the arrival of the 20th century.

== Characters ==
=== Main ===
- Arthur – narrator, writer, of the Etching Grangers, an old family of aristocrats.
- She – alias "Miss Etchingham Granger", the mystery woman who introduces the Fourth Dimension and their plans.
- Lady Etchingham Granger – Arthur's elderly aunt and freedom activist.
- Callan – famous writer and co-founder of a journal, The Hour. Gives Arthur a job.
- Fox – editor of The Hour and Dimensionist.
- Edward Churchill – Foreign Minister; offers Arthur the chance to collaborate on a book about Oliver Cromwell.
- Rt Hon Charles Gurnard – Chancellor of the Exchequer and Dimensionist.
- The Duc de Mersch – railway baron and foreign financier involved in the Greenland plan.

=== Others ===
- Lea – Arthur's literary mentor and publisher's reader; encourages Arthur in his new venture.
- Mr Polehampton – Arthur's literary publisher.
- Miss Churchill – Churchill's sister.
- Baron Halderschrodt – de Mersh's banker in chief.
