= The Mind of Mr. Soames =

1970 British film by Alan Cooke

- Lobby card featuring Terence Stamp and Nigel Davenport
- Directed by: Alan Cooke
- Written by: John Hale; Edward Simpson
- Based on: novel by Charles Eric Maine
- Produced by: Max Rosenberg; Milton Subotsky
- Starring: Terence Stamp; Robert Vaughn; Nigel Davenport; Christian Roberts; Donal Donnelly; Vickery Turner; Judy Parfitt
- Cinematography: Billy Williams
- Edited by: Bill Blunden
- Music by: Michael Dress
- Production company: Amicus Productions
- Distributed by: Columbia Pictures
- Release date: 12 October 1970 (U.S.)
- Running time: 92 minutes
- Countries: United Kingdom; United States
- Language: English

The Mind of Mr. Soames is a 1970 British-American sci-fi–drama film directed by Alan Cooke and starring Terence Stamp, Robert Vaughn, Nigel Davenport and Christian Roberts. It was written by John Hale and Edward Simpson based on Charles Eric Maine's 1961 novel of the same name.

A man awakens from a 30-year coma with an immature brain.

== Plot ==
John Soames is a thirty-year-old man who has been in a coma since a brain injury during birth. After an operation and now revived, he shows the behaviour of an infant and is monitored by two doctors attempting to find out if he can be rehabilitated into the adult world.

During all this time, John has met no women, nor had any schooling in morality. Eventually, John is allowed outside into the natural world, but is told to wait six months until he goes outside again. Frustrated, John breaks free, sleeps rough and behaves antisocially. He is hit by a car and rather than take him to hospital, the drivers put him in their spare bedroom. John leaves the house and takes a train on which he accidentally disturbs a teenaged girl who pulls the emergency brake. As the train stops, John hops off and runs away through the countryside with the girl telling a guard that John tried to attack her.

He is pursued by police with dogs who track him to a barn. His doctors arrive and after a struggle he is returned to his institution.

== Cast ==
- Terence Stamp as John Soames
- Robert Vaughn as Doctor Michael Bergen
- Nigel Davenport as Doctor Maitland
- Christian Roberts as Thomas Fleming
- Donal Donnelly as Joe Allan
- Norman Jones as Davis
- Dan Jackson as Nicholls
- Vickery Turner as Naomi
- Judy Parfitt as Jenny Bannerman
- Scott Forbes as Richard Bannerman
- Joe McPartland as Inspector Moore
- Pamela Moiseiwitsch as Melanie Parks
- Billy Cornelius as Sergeant Clifford

== Production ==
The Mind of Mr. Soames was an attempt by Amicus Productions to branch into the non-horror field (they had also tried to option the rights to Flowers for Algernon but had been unable to secure them). The large budget was provided by Columbia Pictures.

== Release ==
The film was released in theatres on 12 October 1970 in the United States, 26 March 1971 in Ireland, 18 June 1971 in Mexico.

== Reception ==
=== Box office ===
The Mind of Mr. Soames was a failure at the box office.

=== Critical response ===
The Monthly Film Bulletin wrote: "Despite the contemporary, science-fiction /fact fascination 'of the operation that turns John Soames from a vegetable into a human being, The Mind of Mr. Soames works itself out in a curiously old-fashioned way ... what finally defeats the film is not so much its facile treatment or its more upbeat ending (rapping with the blunt end of its moral concern the obtrusive irresponsibility of the mass media) as the progression of inane, extraneous detail and incident which prevents the mind of Mr. Soames ever coming into prominence. Terence Stamp is unremarkable but effective in Soames's more withdrawn moments, bewildered and defensively introverted; but once Soames tries adjusting more positively to the world, the part is a piece with the rest of the film: hesitant scraps of action put across with little conviction."

Roger Greenspun of The New York Times wrote: "There are some movies that do nothing right, no matter how well they do it, and such a movie is The Mind of Mr. Soames, not that it does anything well. But with each scene, each camera movement, each gesture from its large and dispirited cast,The Mind of Mr. Soames ... displays an emptiness and a falseness of response that is beneath even the inadequacy of its ideas and the banality of its plot."

Variety wrote: "Stamp does an outstanding job in a difficult characterization and is convincing as the man with the whole new world before him. His shadings catch the imagination. Vaughn and Nigel Maitland, as the institution head, are well cast in dramatic roles and Donal Donnelly scores too, as a sympathetic doctor. Supporting cast generally is good. Technical departments add immeasurably to the excellence of the film."

The Radio Times Guide to Films Alan Jones gave the film 4/5 stars, writing: "A thought-provoking psychological study of human behaviour, director Alan Cooke's sensitive work signalled an exciting new direction for Amicus, Hammer's nearest British rival, as they entered the horror-swamped 1970s. Terence Stamp is brought out of a 30-year coma by neurosurgeon Robert Vaughn and, following a crash course in the ways of society, is sent into the terrifying outside world. In one of his finest roles, Stamp is outstanding; his subtle character shadings ooze a captivating truth. An overlooked, intelligent thriller."

In Sight and Sound Philip Kemp wrote: "Stamp, channelling some of the innocence of his breakthrough role as Billy Budd (1962), gives a touching performance as he struggles to take on board a host of – to him – incomprehensible experiences. ... The film suffers from some over-simplification – Maitland's character in particular verges on caricature – but the makers have the courage to avoid an overly neat ending; it's neither happy nor tragic, just bleak."

Leslie Halliwell wrote "Ill-advised attempt at science-fiction with meaning; its earnestness becomes a bore."

== Home media ==
The film was released on DVD by Sony Pictures Home Entertainment on 4 March 2011.
