= Ladies Whose Bright Eyes =

1911 novel by Ford Madox Ford

- Author: Ford M. Hueffer (name used by Ford Madox Ford at that time)
- Language: English
- Genre: Science fiction novel
- Publisher: Constable
- Publication date: 1911
- Publication place: United Kingdom
- Media type: Print (hardback)
- Pages: 363 pp

Ladies Whose Bright Eyes is a novel by Ford Madox Ford. It was written in 1911 and extensively revised in 1935. The first edition was published as by "Ford Madox Hueffer", the form of his name he used at that time. The revised edition was published as by "Ford Madox Ford", the name he adopted after World War I.

Although it has a time travel theme of a sort, is usually classed as mainstream literature rather than science fiction. As its author explicitly stated, " (...)The idea of this book was suggested to me by Mark Twain's A Connecticut Yankee in King Arthur's Court. It occurred to me to wonder what would really happen to a modern man thrown back to the Middle Ages...". It has also been suggested that Ford's attempt to divorce his wife, Elsie Martindale Hueffer and marry Violet Hunt lies behind the novel's time-travelling theme.

== Plot summary ==
Unlike Twain's Hank Morgan and some successors, Ford's Mr. Sorrell makes only a very half-hearted attempt to build modern weaponry and machinery in the Middle Ages. His initial dream of constructing "guns and gas bombs" and making himself "mightier than kings" soon comes to naught. Though he had been a mining engineer in the twentieth century, he has no idea how to go about constructing such devices under fourteenth-century conditions, or even where there are tin deposits. Having later in his career become a publisher does not give him any idea of how to invent printing from scratch and anticipate Gutenberg. He does not know how to make a gun, or in fact anything that would make him useful in the medieval castle community into which he has fallen.

Instead, Mr. Sorrell finds that a golden cross which he carries causes him to be mistaken for a Greek miracle-worker – which has many advantages in medieval society, including enjoying the unlimited hospitality of a castle and having beautiful ladies vying with each other for his love. He also inspires the ladies to take up arms and hold a tournament in competition with their knightly husbands – and being a fair horseman, makes a credible effort at becoming a knight himself.

It is the reverse of A Connecticut Yankee in King Arthur's Court, but the details of daily life are rendered more feelingly, including the quite earthy and mercenary motivations of many of the medieval characters (for example, the small-minded power struggles taking place in a nunnery, under a very thin veneer of piety). Cathedrals, so stately and calm to us, turn out to have been crowded, garish, noisy, and commercial.

Just as he begins to really enjoy himself as a thoroughly medieval man, Mr. Sorrell is rather frustratingly thrust back to the twentieth century – a modern man wiser for having been instructed by the people (especially the women) of the past, and having "learned the wisdom of history".

== See also ==
- A Connecticut Yankee in King Arthur's Court
