= Elsie M. Hueffer =

British translator (1876–1949)

- Elsie Martindale Hueffer
- Born: Elizabeth Martindale; 28 September 1876; London, England
- Died: 29 January 1949 (aged 72); Hastings, England
- Occupation: Translator
- Spouse: Ford Madox Ford (m. 1894; died 1939)
- Children: 2
- Writing career
- Pen name: E.M. Elsie Martindale

Elsie Martindale Hueffer (28 September 1876 – 29 January 1949) was an early translator of Guy de Maupassant's short stories into English. She was married to the novelist and poet Ford Madox Ford (1873–1939).

== Personal life ==
Born in London, she was the third child of Dr William Martindale, an analytical chemist, author of Extra Pharmacopeia and assistant to Lord Lister, and mother Mariah, a matron at a hospital in Dublin. Her siblings were Mary and William. She suffered from a "tubercular affection of the knee" and was sent to Pretoria House, a progressive, trilingual (English, German and French) school initially located on Harley Street, London, which later moved to Folkestone, Kent.

=== Courtship and marriage to Ford Madox Hueffer ===
It was at Pretoria House that Martindale became the girlfriend of Ford Madox Hueffer (later known as Ford Madox Ford), earning her the nickname "The Captain's Wife". Ford, almost three years her senior, sent her a ring on her 16th birthday in 1892. Her parents were against the idea of marriage to Ford, whom they considered financially unsuitable, and they were suspicious of his "advanced ideas, especially about sex". Her sister, Mary Martindale, was also interested in Ford, and their parents, having long feared for Mary's sanity, were "terrified of the effect on her of any special intimacy" between Ford and Elsie.

Ford's first novel The Shifting of the Fire (pub. 1892) "reflected his love for Elsie". While Ford was travelling in Europe the couple wrote love letters to each other, and by March 1893, without her parents’ blessing, they had become engaged. Around the same time, Ford dedicated a collection of poems, The Questions at the Well, written under the pseudonym Fenil Haig, to her. Soon after this, her mother opined that "she would rather see Elsie dead than married to Ford." However, in October of the same year, Ford's grandfather, painter Ford Madox Brown, died, prompting a mild détente between the two families, to the extent that she was allowed to accompany Ford on a trip to see one of Madox Brown's monuments. She also accompanied Ford to lectures given by expatriate Russian anarchists, some held at William Morris's home, and mixed with Ford's Pre-Raphaelite artist family.

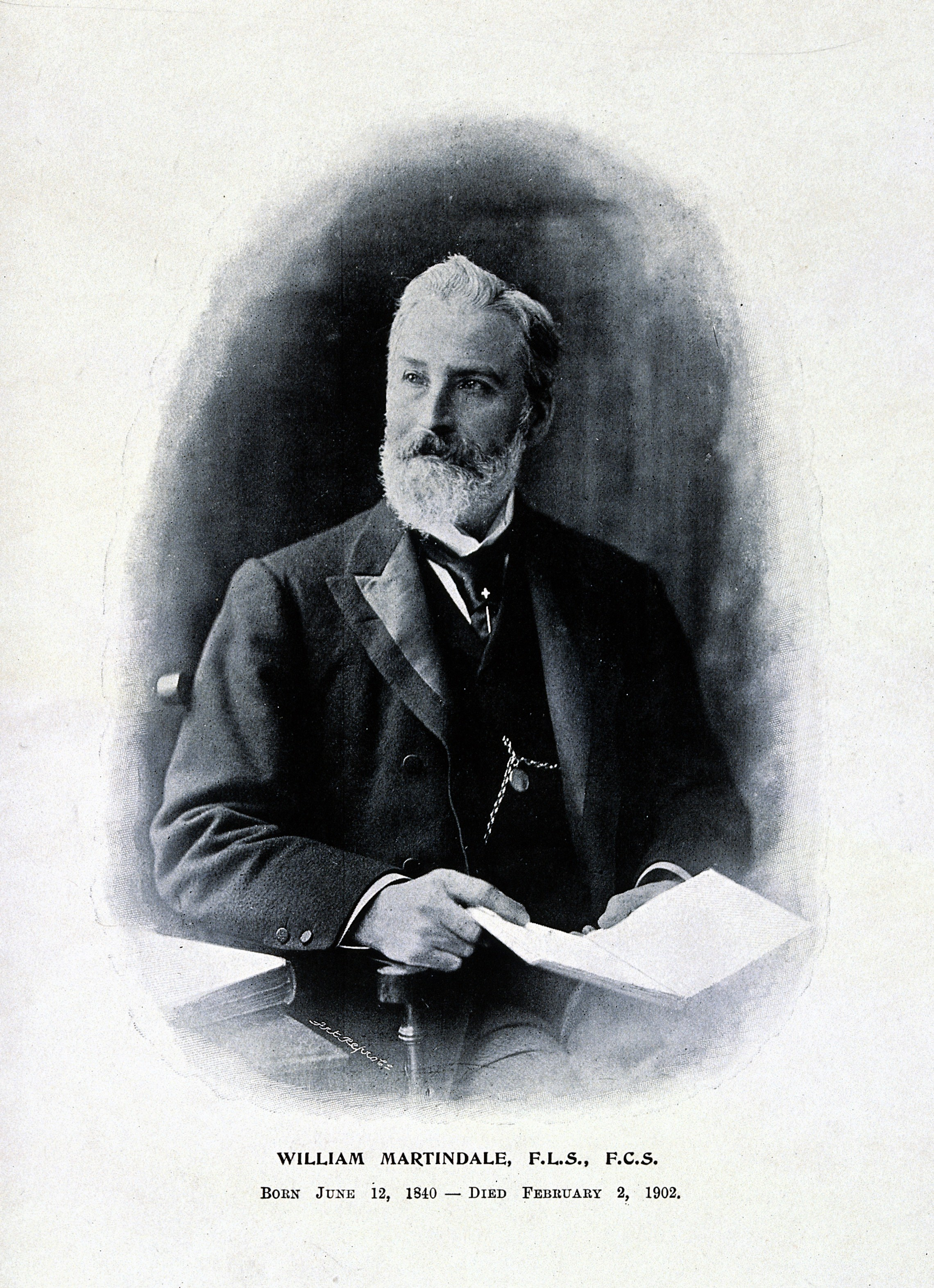
Dr William Martindale (1840–1902)

However, things came to a head between Ford and her parents in January 1894. Her father sought counsel from "the cautious" William Rossetti, who suggested that he ask Ford for an apology and establish an agreement regarding limited visits and letters until they were of an age to marry. Instead of heeding Rossetti's advice, however, her father sent Ford an angry letter stating, among other things, "you must prove to me that you possess more true manliness than you have exhibited during the last twelve months".

To keep the couple apart, her father sent her and her sister Mary to the family farm in Winchelsea, Sussex. However, she gave Mary the slip and headed to Bristol, where she met up with Ford. As part of her father's rescue efforts, he called on both Edward Elgar and Rossetti to check on Elsie's whereabouts, but to no avail. The situation continued to deteriorate, to the point that her father applied to have her made a ward of court. However, he was too late. By the time the case was heard, the couple had already been married for three weeks. They had needed to give false ages, as she was still only 17, and not legally allowed to marry without parental consent. Upon marriage, she took Ford's surname, Hueffer.

=== Life with Ford ===
After their marriage, Hueffer and Ford moved to Bonnington on the edge of Kent's Romney Marsh. By December 1895, 18 months after their marriage, her father had made peace with their relationship. The couple had two daughters, Christina (born 1897) and Katherine (born 1900). In 1901 the family moved to Winchelsea.

Violet Hunt (1862–1942)

Ford had told Hueffer when they married that "she could not expect him to be faithful to her." Over the course of the next eight years the couple became estranged. Around 1908 Ford had an affair with Hueffer's sister, Mary. In 1909 Ford left Hueffer for the author Violet Hunt, with whom he had also been having an affair. Hueffer petitioned the court for restitution of her conjugal rights, but Ford refused. In 1910 he spent eight days in prison for unpaid alimony.

Ford, a Catholic, petitioned Hueffer for a divorce. She refused, not wishing to "prejudice the future of her daughters, who belonged to a church which did not recognise divorce". At some point in the early 1920s, she converted to Catholicism and, despite his regular requests, continued to refuse him a divorce, calling herself Mrs Elsie Hueffer for the rest of her life. On two occasions (1912 and 1924), Hueffer successfully sued Hunt for calling herself "Mrs Hueffer". In 1924, the judge granted a "perpetual injunction" preventing Hunt from ever calling herself Mrs Hueffer in the future.

=== Life after Ford ===
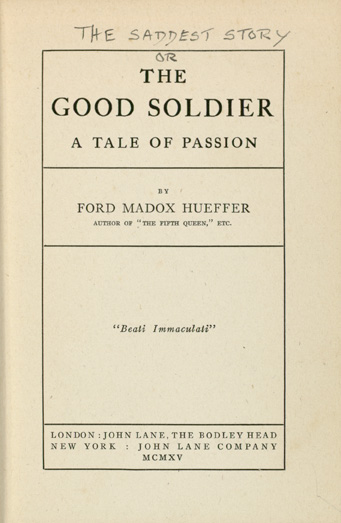
The Good Soldier, first edition

Ford's attempts to divorce Hueffer and marry Hunt inspired his time-travelling novel Ladies Whose Bright Eyes (pub. 1911). The Good Soldier (pub. 1915) reflected "the agonies Ford went through with his wife and his mistress in the six preceding years."

By 1918, Hueffer was living in Charing, Kent with her daughter Katherine, moving to Appledore, Kent in 1923. In the mid-1920s, against Ford's wishes, Hueffer and also, coincidentally, Hunt, sold letters that Joseph Conrad had written to Ford. By 1939, Hueffer was living in Tenterden with her sister, but she had moved to Hastings by the time she died.

== Writing ==
Hueffer knew Joseph Conrad through his friendship with Ford. She and Conrad would discuss their writing, including in 1902 her thoughts on his short story Heart of Darkness.

Encouraged in her writing by Ford and Conrad, she translated Maupassant's short stories into English. Published in 1903 as Stories from de Maupassant, this was one of the earliest collections of his work in English, with Ford contributing a preface and Conrad assisting with suggestions in the "office of an intelligent dictionary". In a letter to Ford, Conrad wrote, "I consider her by temperament eminently fit for the task and her appreciation of the author guarantees success." She is listed on the title page as "E.M.", as women translators in the 19th century were "relatively invisible". The collection was re-published in 2020 as Mademoiselle Perle and Other Stories, together with translations of other Maupassant works by Ada Galsworthy.

In 1909, Hueffer published an "undistinguished" novel, Margaret Hever, under the pen name Elizabeth Martindale. Its subject was a marriage under strain from a triangular relationship between "a remarkable young girl, an aged historian and his unconventional young cousin". Of the work, Conrad wrote to her saying "I congratulate you. If my own stuff were not so damnably bad, I could better express my appreciation of yours."

Towards the end of her relationship with Ford she met Alice B. Toklas and Gertrude Stein. In The Autobiography of Alice B. Toklas, Toklas listed Hueffer as one of the "wives of geniuses" that she sat with, while Gertrude talked to the husbands. Through her relationship with Ford she also socialised with Wyndham Lewis, Stephen Crane and Henry James.

In 1925 she became involved in trying to ensure the continuity – after only eight issues – of the short-lived publication Two Worlds, Samuel Roth's "literary quarterly devoted to the increase of the gaiety of nations".

In 1939 she was registered to attend a seminar about 'southern writers' at the Women's College of the University of North Carolina.
