= Last Post (novel) =

1928 novel by Ford Madox Ford

- First edition (US)
- Author: Ford Madox Ford
- Series: Parade's End
- Publisher: Duckworth (UK); Albert and Charles Boni (US)
- Publication date: 1928
- Pages: 292 pp.
- OCLC: 558845397
- Preceded by: A Man Could Stand Up —

Last Post is the fourth and final novel of Ford Madox Ford's highly regarded sequence of four novels, Parade's End. It was published in January 1928 in the UK by Duckworth, and in the US under the title The Last Post by Albert and Charles Boni, and also the Literary Guild of America.

The book entered the public domain in the United States in 2024.

== Summary ==
Last Post is set during a few hours of a June day, in the years following the First World War. As the earlier volumes traced the approach of war and the war itself, both in the trenches and on the home front, so Last Post explores the legacy of that conflict, the unsettling landscape of the post-war world with its ruined certainties and devastated traditions.

The novel is divided into two unequal parts, the first comprising almost two-thirds of the whole. Christopher Tietjens now makes his living as a dealer in old furniture. He and Valentine Wannop share a cottage in West Sussex with Christopher's older brother Mark and Mark's French wife, Marie Léonie. The first, longer part explores this ménage and the wider community that surrounds it. Last Post frequently picks up on incidents and references from the earlier volumes, enlarging upon them or offering alternative perspectives and interpretations. The second part of the novel concentrates on the threats to the occupants of the cottage and their way of life that is presented by the intrusion of Christopher's estranged wife Sylvia, their son, the American tenant that has moved into Groby, the Tietjens family's ancestral home, and others.

Much of Last Post is presented from Mark's point of view as he lies, mute and immobile, in an outdoor shelter; other sections are presented from the viewpoints of Marie Léonie and Valentine Wannop. The narrative also dips in and out of the consciousnesses of Sylvia Tietjens, her son Mark Tietjens Junior, and several minor characters. These interior monologues traverse the past, speculate on the future, illuminate details of the present situation and review past events, particularly ‘that infernal day’ and ‘that dreadful night’ of the Armistice, around which the memories of the major characters circle obsessively. Others tensions arise from the pregnant Valentine's painful awareness of her unmarried status and the precarious financial state in which she and Christopher are placed. Most immediately, this is due to the failure of Christopher's US-based partner in the antiques business to pay the money that he owes. But more importantly, it is due to the feud between Christopher and his immensely wealthy brother, a feud brought about by Sylvia's promotion of scurrilous rumours about her husband, which were initially believed by Mark and, consequently, by their father. In Christopher's eyes, this makes it impossible for him to accept, either by gift or by inheritance, money or property from his brother. The threats to the Tietjens ménage derive directly or indirectly from the continued malicious scheming of Sylvia, who has tried to turn their neighbour and landlord against them, and manoeuvred an American tenant of Groby (the Tietjens ancestral home) into cutting down Groby Great Tree, ‘the symbol of Tietjens’.

Christopher has flown to York in an attempt to avert this threat and is thus largely absent from the action of the novel yet constantly present in the minds of the other characters. By means of their varied and sometimes contradictory views of him, the novel offers a complex picture of the ‘reconstructed’, post-war man, who must negotiate this hazardous terrain of ‘peacetime’. The invasion of the Tietjens domain by the American tenant and the Tietjenses’ son, by Sylvia and by other figures from earlier in the tetralogy, closes with Sylvia's retreat and change of heart. The novel's fine and poignant ending focuses on the death of Mark Tietjens.
