= Norman Jones (actor) =

English actor (1932–2013)

- Publicity still for Coronation Street
- Born: 16 June 1932; Donnington, Shropshire, England
- Died: 23 April 2013 (aged 80); Telford, Shropshire, England
- Resting place: Telford Crematorium
- Occupation: Actor

Norman Jones (16 June 1932 – 23 April 2013) was an English actor, primarily known for his work on television.

== Early life ==
A native of Shropshire, Norman Jones was born at Donnington, son of coal miner Clar (sic) and his wife Florrie Jones. He was educated at Adams' Grammar School, Newport, Shropshire. He took part in local amateur dramatics in Donnington and was employed as a cost clerk at the Lilleshall Company and Sankey's in the area.

== Career ==
Jones began his acting career at Birmingham Repertory Theatre, and commenced a screen career in 1962, the year of his 30th birthday.

Over the following 26 years he appeared in numerous episodes of British TV series. This included three Doctor Who serials — The Abominable Snowmen (1967, as Khrisong), Doctor Who and the Silurians (1970, as Major Baker) and The Masque of Mandragora (1976, as Hieronymous). He also appeared in Crossroads (as milkman Ralph Palmer) and The Professionals. In The Sweeney he was cast as Detective Inspector Perrault in the 1976 episode "Bad Apple". He also played another detective, Chief Inspector Bell, in the first series of Inspector Morse, broadcast in 1987.

Jones had roles in films including You Only Live Twice (1967), Oh! What a Lovely War (1969), The Mind of Mr. Soames (1970), and The Abominable Dr. Phibes (1971).

Jones played Nicholas Higgins in the 1975 TV serial North and South. He also played Ernest Defarge in the 1980 TV adaptation of A Tale of Two Cities.

Jones also appeared in the title role of The Crooked Man in the Granada Television series The Adventures of Sherlock Holmes. His last appearance was in the 1988 shot-on-video British independent production, The Assassinator (released on DVD as Hitman).

== Personal life and death ==
Jones lived and worked in the United States for a time, as well as in Manchester, Birmingham and London, before settling in Newport, Shropshire. He died, after a heart attack, at the Princess Royal Hospital in Telford on 23 April 2013, aged 80. He was cremated at Telford Crematorium.

== Filmography ==
| Year | Title | Role | Notes |
|---|---|---|---|
| 1967 | You Only Live Twice | American Astronaut (Chris) | |
| 1969 | Oh! What a Lovely War | Scottish Soldier | |
| 1970 | The Mind of Mr. Soames | Davis | |
| 1971 | The Abominable Dr. Phibes | Sgt. Tom Schenley | |
| 1972 | All Coppers Are... | Sgt. Wallis | |
| 1977 | The Stick Up | Second Policeman | |
| 1980 | A Tale of Two Cities | Monsieur Ernest Defarge | |
| 1992 | The Assassinator | Arthur | (final film role) |
