= No More Parades (novel) =

1925 novel by Ford Madox Ford

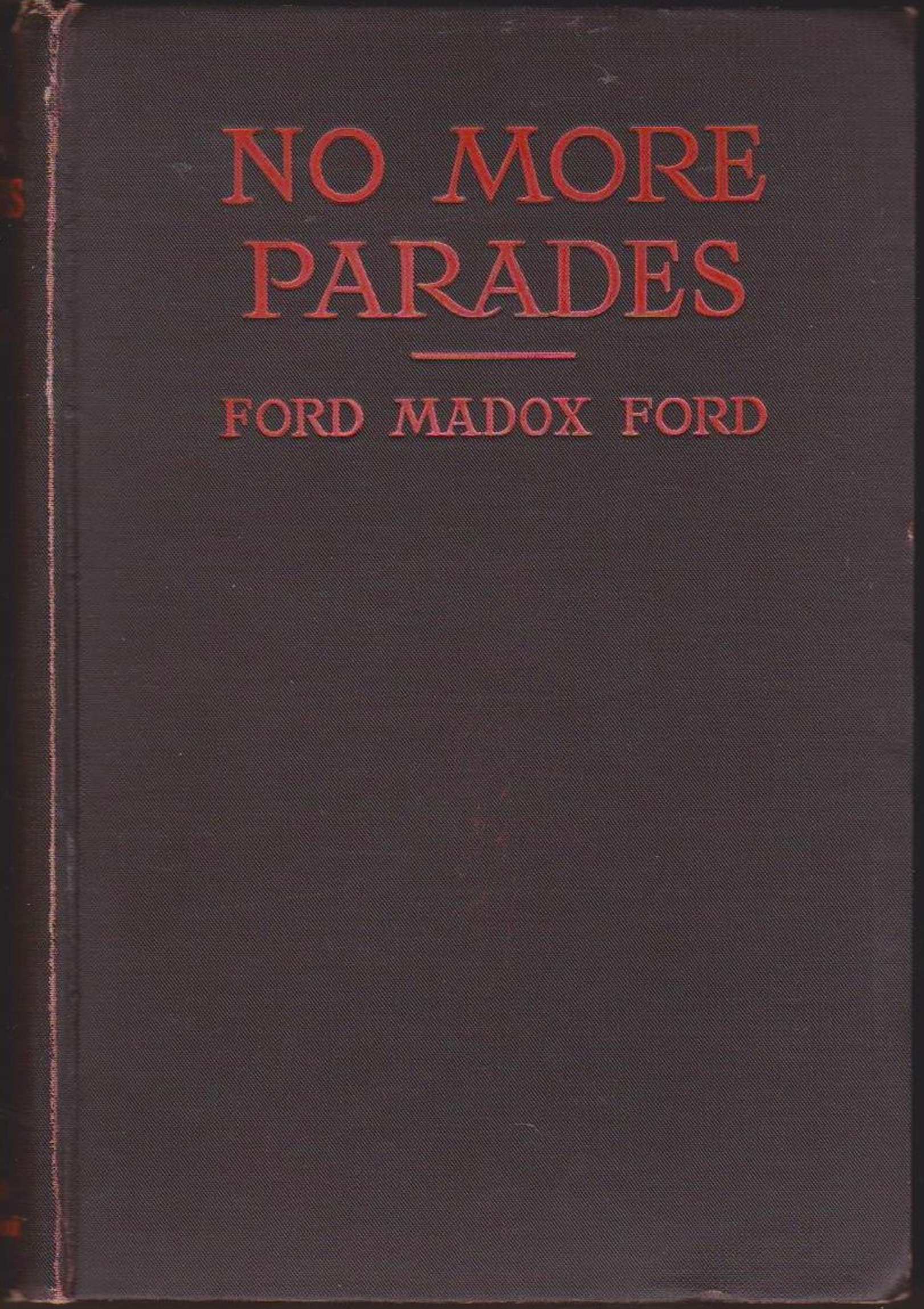
- Author: Ford Madox Ford
- Series: Parade's End
- Publisher: A. & C. Boni
- Publication date: 1925
- Pages: 309 pp.
- OCLC: 681214
- Preceded by: Some Do Not …
- Followed by: A Man Could Stand Up —

No More Parades is the second novel of Ford Madox Ford's highly regarded tetralogy about the First World War, Parade's End. It was published in 1925, and was extraordinarily well-reviewed.

== Summary by Chapter ==
=== Part I ===
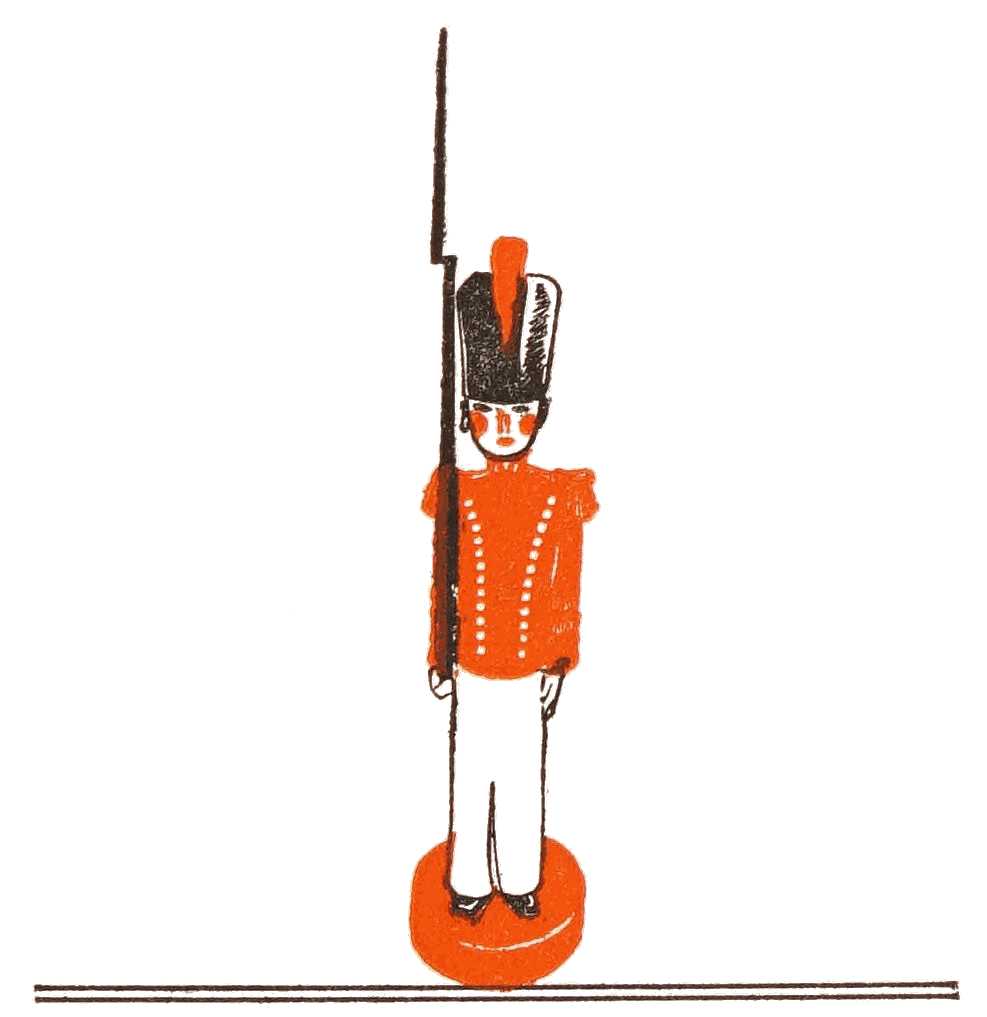
Image of a soldier from the book's inside title

Part I deals, primarily, with Captain Christopher Tietjens at work.

I.i. The novel opens with Captain Christopher Tietjens, ably helped by Sergeant-Major Cowley, trying to move a draft of 2,994 troops, among them a contingent of Canadian railway workers, from a base camp in Rouen to the trenches at the front. His efforts are blocked by having orders given and then countermanded; by having inadequate supplies for these troops from a quartermaster who profits by holding them back; by contending with a French railway strike meant to prevent the withdrawal of British troops from the front but which also prevents them from being sent to the front; and by fighting the interference of the British Garrison Police, who constantly harass the Canadian volunteers whom they willfully and mistakenly take for conscripts. Moreover, General Lord Edward Campion, Tietjens’ godfather, has assigned to his godson's staff the shell-shocked and intermittently mad, though highly decorated, Captain McKechnie, a classical scholar and proud of it. He has just returned from divorce-leave without getting a divorce. All this while Tietjens’ hut is being shelled by the Germans, whose shrapnel kills O Nine Morgan. He bleeds to death in Tietjens' arms—Morgan a Welsh soldier whom Tietjens had declined leave to settle matters with his unfaithful wife in Pontardulais because he would have been beaten to death there by her lover, Red Evans Williams, a prize-fighter.

I.ii. The "All-clear" signal is sounded: the German attack is over. Morgan's and McKechnie's marital troubles trigger Tietjens' brooding on his own as he recalls his "excruciatingly unfaithful" wife, Sylvia. Tietjens tries to distract McKechnie and steady his own mind by writing a sonnet for McKechnie to translate into Latin. While composing the sonnet, Tietjens attends to the problems of his draft, helping the soldiers to write their wills among other things. In the midst of intense occupation with these matters, Colonel Stanley Levin from General Campion's staff arrives and insists on speaking privately to Tietjens, who presumes, incorrectly, that Levin wants his advice on the problems he is having with his fiancée, Mlle de Bailly, and her family. But he actually wants to talk to Tietjens about another woman altogether—one who is waiting in the general's car to see the captain. Thoughts about Levin's fiancée lead Tietjens to thoughts about Valentine Wannop, whom he loves totally but neglects completely, refusing to write to her while married to Sylvia. But when a Canadian soldier requests two hours leave to visit with his mother, who has come to Rouen, Tietjens thinks of having two such hours with Valentine. Consequently, military work that urgently needs doing is interfered with by forces both personal and impersonal. This becomes more urgently the case when Levin tells Tietjens that the woman in the general's car who is waiting to see him is Sylvia herself, who has pursued him across the Channel without passport or papers.

I.iii. Levin offers to help Tietjens with his problems, which disgusts Tietjens completely: he would “rather be dead than an open book”—that is, rather be dead, as O Nine Morgan is, than expose his marital life to the small world that surrounds him. But Tietjens privately rehearses for himself his relationship with Sylvia, trying to organize events as a military report so as to clarify everything precisely for himself. In writing out his recollections, he in effect gives a summary of events that took place in Some Do Not . . .. He focuses particularly on Sylvia's parting from him some ninety-eight days ago by ordering a taxi to take her to Paddington Station at 4:00 a.m. to catch a train to Birkenhead where she will enter into a nearby convent of Premonstratensian nuns for a long, if not a permanent, retreat. This to Tietjens is a sign that she is putting an end to their marriage and that he is free to pursue Valentine, whom Sylvia has contrived to have meet him the night before he leaves for France. Tietjens has time to reminisce on these matters because, although Sylvia had been waiting in the general's car to see him, she has had herself driven away without saying a word to her husband.

I.iv. Tietjens gets his Canadian soldiers bedded down for the night, feeling at the same time a strong passion for his girl and his country. These things get done in the face of what Levin tells Tietjens about the problems that Sylvia has caused General Campion, who will not stand for having “skirts” in his encampment. He hears more about troubles with women from McKechnie, who keeps him awake until 4:30 a.m. talking about his marital problems. Tietjens nevertheless gets his draft bedded down, even as he sees more trouble brewing with General O’Hara's police who deliberately keep some of his Canadian volunteers from getting back to base on time and then arrest them. In addition, he learns that Lord Beichan, a newspaper magnate, has placed a Veterinary-Lieutenant Hochkiss in charge of “hardening” horses, and Tietjens will not stand for such brainless brutality. Consequently, with troubles developing all round him, it becomes clear to Tietjens that even though he has done better work commanding his unit than any of his peers commanding theirs and even though he is ill with bad lungs, his being sent to the front to face almost certain death seems inevitable. And over all this worry for Tietjens "hung the shadow of a deceased Welsh soldier". Part I, therefore, ends as it began: with the death of O Nine Morgan.

=== Part II ===
Part II deals, principally, with the machinations of Sylvia Tietjens.

II.i. Although she has made an appearance in I.ii, where she is seen looking through the window of General Campion's automobile, Sylvia Tietjens is fully present and dominates this chapter by commanding all around her by her stunningly beautiful presence in "the admirably appointed, white-enamelled, wickerworked, bemirrored lounge of the best hotel" in Rouen. She has come to France without proper documentation in the company of Major Perowne (Major Wilfrid Fosbrooke Eddicker Perowne) of General Campion's staff, one of her more incompetent lovers, convinced that the war is a schoolboys' game played to seduce and rape women. Throughout the chapter Perowne is in her presence both urging Sylvia to leave her bedroom door open for him that night and fearing the appearance of Tietjens, whom he sees in a mirror, and who could easily, as Sylvia says, break his back over his knee. Sylvia's supposed purpose in coming to Rouen is to have Christopher sign a document, which requires no signature, that gives her the legal right to live at Groby, his family's ancestral home in Yorkshire, and makes their son Michael successor to it. But her real purpose in coming to Rouen is to seduce Christopher with whom she has not slept in five years. But Tietjens' interest in Sylvia disappeared with her speaking the word "Paddington" loudly to her taxi driver, which signaled her disappearance into the convent near Birkenhead as well as her intention of separating from him. Christopher's mind and heart have now settled on Valentine Wannop, who had agreed to be his lover at the end of Some Do Not . . . although they have never even kissed.

II.ii. Perowne having "melted away", Sylvia is now in the presence of Christopher and former Sergeant-Major Cowley, who has just been promoted to Lieutenant, and whose promotion Tietjens insists on celebrating with him. Along with settling the Groby affair with Sylvia and with honoring Cowley's promotion, Tietjens is shown as having earlier in the day attended to pressing problems even as he now attends to a series of questions that others have failed to answer. For instance, Levin's marriage to Mlle de Bailly had been stalled by a "disagreeable duchess" who objected to the price of coal for her hothouses, which Christopher solved by having coal from his own estate sent to her at the pit price it sold for on the day before the war began. General Campion is equally amazed at Tietjens' "positive genius for getting all sorts of things out of the most beastly muddles" and his "positive genius for getting into the most disgusting messes". Sylvia tries to make things worse for Christopher by telling Campion that her husband is a Socialist who wants to model his life on that of Jesus Christ, which leads Campion to say he will have Tietjens court-martialed—a decision that he later realizes is unwarranted. Sylvia further complicates her husband's life by flirting with General O'Hara, who foolishly thinks that she is inviting him to be her lover.

=== Part III ===
Part III deals with General Lord Edward Campion sitting in judgment of the previous events.

III.i. Colonel Levin, acting for General Campion, speaks to Tietjens, whom General O'Hara has placed under arrest, about events of the early hours of the morning—events that took place about 3:00 a.m. Tietjens had thrown Perowne bodily out of Sylvia's bedroom and had also ejected O'Hara from it as he insisted on seeing her partially naked. He has also threatened O'Hara with arrest if he did not leave their rooms immediately. Tietjens explains the circumstances of these events clearly to Levin for the general's benefit. Although he does not say so, it is evident that Sylvia created this debacle: she has, in the phrase of the novel, "pulled the string of a shower-bath" to give Tietjens a dousing. Meanwhile, Campion has temporarily suspended O'Hara as chief of the Garrison Police and has given Perowne a choice between rejoining his regiment at the front or a court-martial. Moreover, he has released Tietjens from arrest to resume his duties. But in spite of these confusing and exhausting events, Christopher has got his draft off to the front early that morning, proving once again his extraordinary competence as a commanding officer.

III.ii. Judgment Day is at hand, and General Lord Edward Campion is the judge. He begins and ends the day in the image of the Godhead. Events in the novel have taken place for two days in the darkness of night; now everything is seen brightly in the light of day so that judgment can be accurately rendered. This chapter begins where the novel itself began in Tietjens' hut where 0 9 Morgan died. Campion gets everything straight about Christopher and Sylvia. Nevertheless, his only choice is to "promote" Christopher to "certain death" by sending him to General Perry's army at the front. He cannot put Tietjens on his staff because that would smack of nepotism; he cannot assign him as a liaison officer to the French army because the lies written in his dossier by Colonel Drake, Sylvia's former lover, who accused him of being a French spy, prevent it; he cannot assign him to Transport, as his brother Mark requested, because Christopher would then be answerable to Veterinary-Lieutenant Hotchkiss, who brutalizes horses under the orders and protection of Lord Beichan. Tietjens therefore gets the same treatment as Perowne: a choice between court-martial or the trenches. He refuses to ask for a court-martial that would show his innocence because it would publicly show Sylvia's guilt; so he must go to the front. With these matters settled, the novel ends with the Godhead inspecting Tietjens’ cook-houses, presented as a cathedral, where Sergeant-Cook Case presides as high priest. This ending is projected as a funeral, Tietjens' funeral—"the band and drums march[ing] away". Christopher Tietjens' parade as the gentleman-husband of a virtuous wife is over and done with. There can be no more parades of that kind anymore.
