= Romance (novel) =

Novel by Joseph Conrad and Ford Madox Ford

First edition (UK)

Romance is a novel written by Joseph Conrad and Ford Madox Ford. It was the second of their three collaborations. Romance was eventually published by Smith, Elder & Co. in London in 1903 and by McClure, Phillips and Company in New York in March 1904.

According to Max Saunders, Conrad, in his quest to obtain a literary collaborator, had been recommended by several literary figures. W. E. Henley pointed to Ford as a suitable choice for Conrad. Literary collaboration was not particularly uncommon when Conrad proposed it to Ford, but neither was it considered the proper way for serious novelists, as Ford was aware: "The critics of our favoured land do not believe in collaboration."

The novel was adapted into the film The Road to Romance.

== The collaboration ==
In his biography of Conrad, Joseph Conrad: A Personal Remembrance (1924), Ford alleges that some opponents and critics did not hold the same reverence for his "literary friendship" with Conrad as that which he maintained. But his bond with Conrad had been "for its lack of jealousy a very beautiful thing." Indeed, Ford took the position that he gave Conrad some benefit as a bonding partner, writing: "I was useful to Conrad as a writer and as a man in a great many subordinate ways during his early days of struggle and deep poverty..." In an unpublished section, he withheld a frank passage of confession about his team writer where he contradicts the argument that Conrad "chose to live on terms of intimacy with a parasitic person", stating that such an accusation was as damaging to himself as it was to Conrad.

The writers' wives were involved behind the scenes in the collaborations, often to the despair of Ford, who omitted any mention of Jessie Conrad in his biography.

== Aftermath ==
After the collaboration on Romance was finished, it appears that in 1902 Conrad began to feel a sense of loss over working with Ford for he asked him to keep their partnership alive. The relationship between Ford and Conrad broke down in 1909, however, over specific and personal squabbles, including the financial arrangements to enable Ford to publish Conrad's Some Reminiscences. They saw little of each other after that dispute and spoke less frequently.
