= Vickery Turner =

British actress (1945–2006)

- Born: 3 April 1940; Sunbury-on-Thames, Surrey, England, United Kingdom
- Died: 4 April 2006 (aged 66); Los Angeles, California, United States
- Occupations: Actress, playwright, author, television writer, theatre director
- Spouses: Warren Oates (m. 1969; div. 1974); Michael J. Shannon
- Children: 1

Vickery Turner (3 April 1940 in Sunbury-on-Thames, Middlesex – 4 April 2006), born Christine Hazel Turner, was a British actress, playwright, author and theatre director.

== Career ==
She started out on stage and her first breakthrough role was in the first production of The Prime of Miss Jean Brodie opposite Vanessa Redgrave. For that role Turner received the Clarence Derwent Award for the best supporting performance and the London Critics Award for the most promising newcomer.

Her television work began with Ken Loach's once controversial Up The Junction (1965) for the BBC's Wednesday play series. She acted in many of the more famous British plays of the 1960s. The plays she wrote for the BBC's Thirty-Minute Theatre series were "Keep on Running" and "Magnolia Summer" and for The Wednesday Play "Kippers & Curtains". Her film career included roles in Prudence and the Pill (1968), Crooks and Coronets (1969), The Mind of Mr. Soames (1970), Chandler (1971), Ruby and Oswald (1978), The Good Soldier (1981), and The Return of the Soldier (1982). Her American television appearances include a 1977 episode of The Waltons titled "The Seashore" where she guest starred as Lisa, a troubled student who fled England to escape turmoil and personal tragedy during the onset of World War II.

In 1969 she met Warren Oates while filming Crooks and Coronets and they married. They were divorced in 1974. She was also a successful novelist and her published novels included Focussing, Lovers of Africa (Love & Hunger in the USA), The Testimony of Daniel Pagels and Delicate Matters. Turner's fifth novel—Lost Heir—was scheduled to be published around the time of her death. Another role that she was famous for was "The Brontes of Haworth", where she played Charlotte Brontë.

Her second husband was the actor Michael J. Shannon, whom she met during the American season of Frith Banbury's production of Frank Harvey's The Day After the Fair, in which they both acted. Their daughter Caitlin is an actress and writer.

== Death ==
She died in Los Angeles on April 4, 2006, a day after her 66th birthday.

== Filmography ==
Year	Title	Role	Notes
1968	Prudence and the Pill	Rose the Maid	
1969	Crooks and Coronets	Annie	
1970	The Mind of Mr. Soames	Naomi	
1971	Chandler	Salesgirl	
1982	The Return of the Soldier	Jessica	
