= Some Do Not ... =

1924 novel by Ford Madox Ford

Some Do Not …
- Author: Ford Madox Ford
- Series: Parade's End
- Publisher: T. Seltzer
- Publication date: 1924
- OCLC: 1962841
- Followed by: No More Parades

Some Do Not ..., the first volume of Ford Madox Ford's highly regarded Parade's End tetralogy, was originally published in April 1924 by Duckworth and Co. The following is a summary of the plot, chapter by chapter.

== Part I ==
=== I.i ===
Some Do Not … begins with the two young friends, Christopher Tietjens and Vincent Macmaster, on the train to Rye for a golfing weekend in the country. The year, probably 1912, is only indicated later. Tietjens has a brilliant mind, and speaks it scathingly and heedlessly. Both men work in London as government statisticians; though Macmaster aspires to be a critic, and has just written a short book on Dante Gabriel Rossetti. He plans to call on a parson who knew Rossetti, and who lives near Rye. The first of the novel's two parts covers the ensuing weekend, which changes both their lives. Tietjens is preoccupied with his disastrous marriage.

=== I.ii ===
The second chapter switches to his elegant socialite wife, Sylvia, who is staying with her mother at Lobscheid, a quiet German resort, with their priest, Father Consett. Sylvia had left Tietjens for a lover, Major Perowne, but became bored with him. She's bored in Lobscheid too, but needs the alibi of being there to look after her mother, to account for her absence when she returns to London. Consett probes the state of her marriage, and senses that her anger towards Tietjens is far from indifference.

=== I.iii ===
The narrative returns to England. Macmaster startles Tietjens, who's playing patience in his hotel room, after what has evidently been a fraught day. The action is then pieced together in retrospect. Tietjens shows Macmaster Sylvia's letter saying she intends to return to him. Macmaster has called on the Rev. Mr Duchemin, but was received by his wife, and is instantly infatuated by her Pre-Raphaelite ambience and elegance. He rejoins Tietjens for a round of golf with General Campion and his brother-in-law. At the clubhouse they meet a Liberal Cabinet minister. Their group is outraged by the louche conversation of a pair of lower-middle-class men.

=== I.iv ===
While they are playing, the game is interrupted by two Suffragettes haranguing the minister. Some of the men start chasing them, and the chase threatens to become violent, but Tietjens manages to trip up a policeman as if by accident, and the women escape. General Campion grills Tietjens, believing he is having an affair with one of the women, Valentine Wannop. Tietjens dines with the Cabinet Minister, but becomes anxious when he gets back to his room, which is when Macmaster comes in at the start of I.iii.

=== I.v ===
The next morning Macmaster takes Tietjens to the Duchemins, where he has been invited for one of their celebrated breakfasts. Valentine is also present, helping Mrs Duchemin, who is apprehensive about her husband because he is prone to fits of lunacy. He becomes paranoid that the two guests are doctors coming to take him to an asylum, and destroys the decorum of the occasion, ranting about sex first in Latin, then starting to describe his wedding night. Macmaster saves the day by telling Duchemin's minder how to neutralise him. The episode brings Macmaster and Mrs Duchemin together, and they are soon having an affair. Tietjens and Valentine recognise each other from their encounter on the golf course. One of the other guests is Valentine's mother, a novelist who lives nearby with her daughter. Mrs Wannop has come hoping Macmaster might be able to review her latest book. But she is delighted to meet Tietjens, since his father had helped her when she became widowed. She is one of the few writers he admires. She insists that Tietjens come back with them for lunch.

=== I.vi ===
Tietjens and Valentine walk back through the countryside. When they're overtaken by Mrs Wannop on her dog-cart, he notices that the horse's strap is about to break, and potentially saves her life by fixing it. The Wannops are sheltering the other Suffragette, Gertie, and worry that the police might be looking for them. So Tietjens agrees to drive with Valentine in the cart to hide Gertie with some of the Wannops' relations. While he is there Sylvia sends a telegram, which Valentine reads to him. He is so agitated he worries momentarily that he might have had a stroke.

=== I.vii ===
They leave at ten on Midsummer night, so as not to be seen, and drive all night. On the way back, Tietjens and Valentine are alone, conversing and arguing in the moonlight, and falling in love, until, in the dawn mist, General Campion crashes his car into them and injures the horse.

== Part II ==
=== II.i ===
Part I ends on that scene of carnage. Part II begins several years later, in the middle of the war; probably in 1917. Tietjens is back in London, breakfasting with Sylvia, who flings her plate of food at him. He has been fighting in France, where he was shell-shocked, and much of his memory has been obliterated. He is reduced to reading the Encyclopædia Britannica to restock it. He sees Mrs Wannop regularly – she has moved to London, near his office – and has been helping her write propaganda articles. Sylvia thus suspects he has been having an affair with Valentine, though he has hardly seen her, since she is working as a gym instructor in a girls' school. Macmaster has married Mrs Duchemin (Mr Duchemin having died). He holds literary parties that have become celebrated; but they have kept their marriage secret, and Valentine always accompanies her to the parties to keep up appearances. Sylvia tells Tietjens that the cause of his father's death was the rumours he heard that Tietjens lived on Sylvia's family money, and had got Valentine pregnant.

=== II.ii ===
The banker, Lord Port Scatho, arrives. His nephew, Brownlie, who is infatuated with Sylvia, has unfairly and humiliatingly dishonoured Tietjens' cheques to his army Mess and his club. Christopher reveals that he has been ordered to return to France the following day, and is determined to resign from the club. Tietjens' elder brother, Mark, arrives.

=== II.iii ===
The two brothers walk from Gray's Inn to Whitehall, speaking candidly, as Christopher disabuses Mark about the rumours defaming him and Valentine. It turns out that Mark, asked by his father to find out about Christopher (in case he needed money), had asked his flatmate Ruggles to discover what people were saying about Christopher; and that it was Ruggles who relayed the malicious gossip to their father. As they get to the War Office they run into Valentine, who has come to say goodbye to Christopher. He leaves her to talk to Mark while he goes in for a meeting, at which he is offered the chance to be given a posting at home rather than be returned to France for active service, but he refuses.

=== II.iv ===
Mark talks to Valentine while they wait for Christopher to come out of the meeting. He tells her that his father has left money to provide for Mrs Wannop. Valentine recalls a rare conversation she had with Christopher five or six weeks earlier, at one of Macmaster's parties, during which she realizes he will return to the war. He tells her how his memory is improving, and he was able to help Macmaster with one of his calculations. Macmaster has taken the credit for the work, and been awarded a knighthood on the strength of it. Mrs. Duchemin/Macmaster, who has always disliked Tietjens (despite, or rather because of, all the help and money he has given Macmaster) has been trying to get him out of their lives, and tries to befriend Sylvia, inviting her to one of the parties. Valentine is shocked, and realizes her friendship with Mrs Macmaster is finished. The chapter ends with her parting from them.

=== II.v ===
Outside the War Office, Valentine persuades the Tietjens brothers to shake hands despite Christopher's anger. She and Christopher agree to meet later that night – his last before returning to a likely death – and she agrees to become his mistress, after escorting her drunken brother home.

=== II.vi ===
But in the event, they ... do not. The novel ends with Christopher returning to his dark flat, recalling the events and non-events of the day and night, including his farewell to Macmaster, and especially his last conversations with Valentine. The novel ends with a short paragraph stating that Tietjens got a lift back towards his flat in a transport lorry. It is effectively the first stage of his journey back to the Front, and a probable death.

=== Cancelled Ending ===
Two fragments survive of a cancelled ending, including a scene with Sylvia, who has been waiting for Christopher in their flat, hoping to seduce him after he has slept with Valentine. But she realizes that not only is her plan foiled, but that Tietjens is in love with Valentine. She gives him two black eyes and leaves to go on retreat to a convent. This episode is retold from Christopher's perspective when he recalls it at various points throughout the next novel, No More Parades. The cancelled ending is published in full for the first time in the 2010 Carcanet Press critical edition of Some Do Not …, edited by Max Saunders.]

Please note: The first UK and US editions contained an error in the chapter numbering of Part I, with Chapter VI being mis-numbered as a second Chapter V (and Chapter VII appearing erroneously as Chapter VI). The 1948 Penguin text repeated the error, which was first caught for the 1950 Knopf omnibus edition of Parade's End.
