= The Good Soldier =

1915 novel by Ford Madox Ford

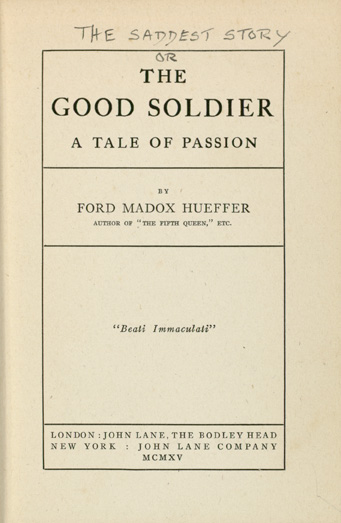
- The first edition of The Good Soldier, with original title and surname.
- Author: Ford Madox Ford
- Original title: The Saddest Story or The Good Soldier: A Tale of Passion
- Language: English
- Genre: Novel
- Publisher: John Lane, The Bodley Head
- Publication date: March 1915
- Publication place: United Kingdom
- Media type: Print (hardback and paperback)

The Good Soldier: A Tale of Passion is a 1915 novel by the British writer Ford Madox Ford. It is set just before World War I, and chronicles the tragedy of Edward Ashburnham and his seemingly perfect marriage, along with that of his two American friends. The novel is told using a series of flashbacks in non-chronological order, a literary technique that formed part of Ford's pioneering view of literary impressionism. Ford employs the device of the unreliable narrator to great effect, as the main character gradually reveals a version of events that is quite different from what the introduction leads the reader to believe. The novel was loosely based on two incidents of adultery and on Ford's messy personal life, specifically "the agonies Ford went through with his wife and his mistress in the six preceding years."

The novel's original title was The Saddest Story, but after the onset of World War I, the publishers asked Ford for a new title. Ford suggested (sarcastically) The Good Soldier, and the name stuck.

In 1998, the Modern Library ranked The Good Soldier 30th on its list of the 100 best English-language novels of the 20th century. In 2015, the BBC ranked The Good Soldier 13th on its list of the 100 greatest British novels. It has been called "the greatest French novel in English."

== Plot summary ==
The Good Soldier is narrated by the character John Dowell, half of one of the couples whose dissolving relationships form the subject of the novel. Dowell tells the story of those dissolutions, plus the deaths of three characters and the madness of a fourth, in a rambling, non-chronological fashion. As an unreliable narrator the reader can consider whether they believe Dowell and his description of how the events unfolded including his own role in the "saddest story ever told".

=== Events as narrated ===
The novel opens with the famous line: "This is the saddest story I have ever heard." Dowell explains that for nine years he, his wife Florence and their friends Captain Edward Ashburnham (the "good soldier" of the book's title) and his wife Leonora, had an ostensibly normal friendship while Edward and Florence sought treatment for their heart ailments at a spa in Nauheim, Germany.

As it turns out, nothing in the relationships or in the characters is as it first seems. Florence's heart ailment is a fiction she perpetrated on John to ensure that he did not seek intimacy from her as it would seemingly be too stressful for her heart, and so to keep him out of her bedroom at night in order that she could continue her affair with an American artist named Jimmy. Edward and Leonora have an unbalanced marriage broken by his constant infidelities (both of body and heart) and by Leonora's attempts to control Edward's affairs (both financial and romantic). Dowell is an innocent American who is coming to realise how much he has been fooled as Florence and Edward had an affair under his nose for nine years without his knowing until Florence was dead.

Dowell tells the story of Edward and Leonora's relationship which appears normal to others but which is a power struggle that Leonora wins. Dowell narrates several of Edward's affairs and peccadilloes including his possibly innocent attempt to comfort a crying servant on a train, his affair with the married Maisie Maidan, the one character in the book whose heart problem was unquestionably real, and his bizarre tryst in Monte Carlo and Antibes with a kept woman known as La Dolciquita. Edward's philandering and gambling ends up costing them a fortune in bribes, blackmail and gifts for his lovers, leading Leonora to take control of Edward's financial affairs. She gradually gets him out of debt.

Florence's affair with Edward leads her to commit suicide when she realises both that Edward is falling in love with his and Leonora's young ward, Nancy Rufford, and that Dowell has found out about her affair with Jimmy. Florence sees Edward and Nancy in an intimate conversation and rushes back to the resort where she sees John talking to a man she used to know (and who knows of her affair with Jimmy). Assuming that her relationship with Edward and her marriage to John are over, Florence takes prussic acid—which she has carried for years in a vial that John thought held her heart medicine—and dies.

Edward's last affair is his most scandalous as he becomes infatuated with Nancy. Nancy came to live with the Ashburnhams after leaving a convent where her parents had sent her; her mother was a violent alcoholic and her father (it is later suggested that this man may not be Nancy's biological father) who physically abused her. Edward, tearing himself apart because he does not want to spoil Nancy's innocence, arranges to have her sent to India to live with her father, even though this frightens her terribly. Once Leonora knows that Edward intends to keep his passion for Nancy chaste, only wanting Nancy to continue to love him from afar, she torments him by making this wish impossible. She pretends to offer to divorce him so he can marry Nancy but informs Nancy of his sordid sexual history, destroying Nancy's innocent love for him. After Nancy's departure, Edward receives a telegram from her that reads, "Safe Brindisi. Having a rattling good time. Nancy." He asks Dowell to take the telegram to his wife, pulls out his pen knife, says that it is time he had some rest and slits his own throat. When Nancy reaches Aden and sees the obituary in the paper, she becomes catatonic.

The novel's last section has Dowell writing from Edward's old estate in England where he takes care of Nancy whom he cannot marry because of her mental illness. Nancy is only capable of repeating two things—a Latin phrase meaning "I believe in an omnipotent God" and the word "shuttlecocks". Dowell states that the story is sad because no one got what they wanted. Leonora wanted Edward but lost him and ended up marrying the normal (but dull) Rodney Bayham. Edward wanted Nancy but gave her up then lost her. Dowell wanted a wife but ended up a nurse to two women.

Dowell ends up generally unsure about where to lay the blame, but expressing sympathy for Edward because he believes himself similar to Edward in nature. The fact is he has been disengaged, a voyeur. While the other characters are flawed, he has never participated in life. On the other hand, he may not entirely be the foolish innocent he presents himself as, as when he walks away from Edward, leaving him to slit his throat with a very small pen knife.

== Major characters ==
- John Dowell: The narrator, husband to Florence. Dowell is an American Quaker. He is either a gullible and passionless man who cannot read the emotions of the people around him or a master manipulator who plays the victim.
- Florence Dowell: John Dowell's wife and a scheming, manipulative, unfaithful woman who uses Dowell for his money while pursuing her affairs on the side. She fakes a heart ailment to get what she wants out of her husband and has a lengthy affair with Edward Ashburnham.
- Edward Ashburnham: Friend of the Dowells and husband of Leonora. Ashburnham is a hopeless romantic who keeps falling in love with the women he meets. He is at Nauheim for the treatment of a heart problem, but the ailment is not real; he used it as an excuse to follow a female heart patient to Nauheim. He is Dowell's opposite, a virile, physical, passionate man.
- Leonora Ashburnham: Edward's wife by a marriage that was more or less arranged by their fathers. Leonora comes to resent Edward's philandering as much for its effect on her life as on her marriage and asserts more and more control over Edward until he dies.
- Nancy Rufford: The young ward of the Ashburnhams. Edward falls in love with Nancy after he tires of Florence. Eventually, Edward arranges for Nancy to be sent to India to live with her father, but she goes mad en route when she learns of Edward's death.
- La Dolciquita: A Spanish dancer (The Grand Duke's mistress) who is Edward's first sexual affair. Although he believes himself to be romantically attached to her, he quickly becomes disillusioned by her thirst for his money.
- Maisie Maidan: A young, pretty, married woman with whom Edward falls in love. Leonora pays for her treatment for a weak heart at Nauheim, knowing that Edward would follow her there. Maisie's heart gives way after she hears Florence and Edward talking about her disparagingly, and she dies.

== Character analysis ==
A central challenge of the novel is judging the characterizations when Dowell is such an unreliable narrator. A question to consider is whether he presented himself in a true light or manipulated his description of events to prevent the reader from discovering his true character. However

"by the end of the novel Dowell has tested the limits of rational explanation. He has interpreted character by religion, nationality, gender and the calendar. Dowell's disillusionment follows the arc of modernism; he begins with presuppositions typical of much Victorian characterization: the individual conditioned by circumstance, composed of intelligible motives, susceptible to moral analysis-the justified self. Then, confronted with the singularity of desire, his 'generalizations' totter and fall."

Dowell admits that his assumptions and characterisations of the people in his life may be flawed.

== Adaptations ==
The novel was adapted into the television film of the same title by Granada Television in 1981. It starred Jeremy Brett, Vickery Turner, Robin Ellis and Susan Fleetwood. It was directed by Kevin Billington and written by Julian Mitchell. In the US it aired as part of the Masterpiece Theatre series.

The novel was adapted as a BBC Radio 4 Book at Bedtime by Ross Kemp in 2008, read by Toby Stephens and produced by Kirsty Williams.

In 2020 the novel was adapted by Sebastian Baczkiewicz as a one hour radio play as part of the BBC Radio 4 Electric Decade season of classic titles that influenced and characterised the Jazz Age of the 1920s.

== See also ==
Burt, Daniel S. The Novel 100. Checkmark Books, 2003. ISBN 0-8160-4558-5
