= Parade's End =

Tetralogy of novels by Ford Madox Ford

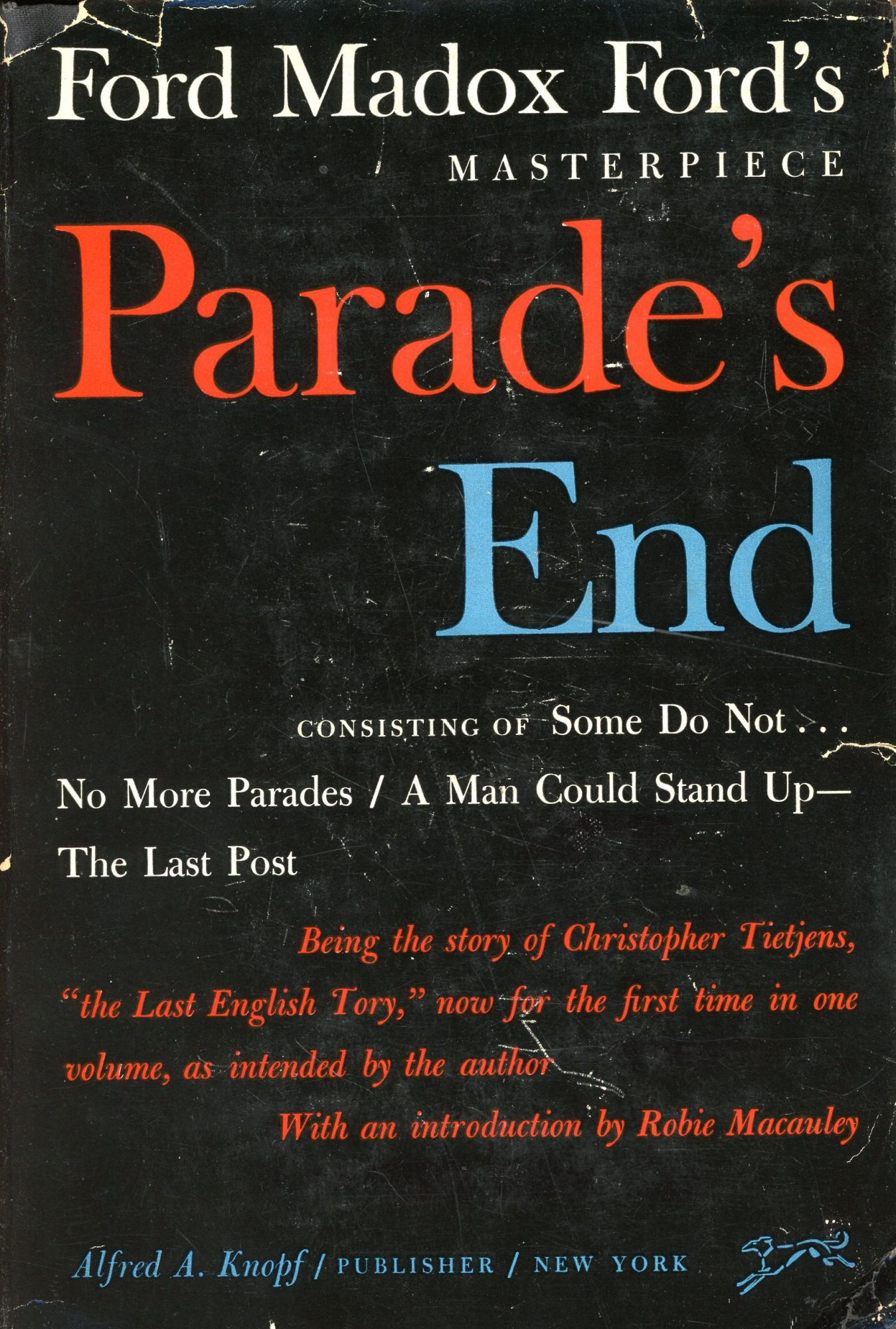
- First complete edition cover (1950)
- Author: Ford Madox Ford
- Language: English
- Genre: Historical fiction, modernist novel
- Publication date: 1924–1928
- Publication place: United Kingdom

Parade's End is a tetralogy of novels by the British novelist and poet Ford Madox Ford, first published from 1924 to 1928. The novels chronicle the life of a member of the English gentry before, during and after World War I. The setting is mainly England and the Western Front of the First World War, in which Ford had served as an officer in the Welch Regiment, a life he vividly depicts. The individual novels are Some Do Not ... (1924), No More Parades (1925), A Man Could Stand Up — (1926) and Last Post (1928).

The work is a complex tale written in a modernist style and does not concentrate on detailing the experience of war. Robie Macauley, in his introduction to the Borzoi edition of 1950, described it as "by no means a simple warning as to what modern warfare is like... [but] something complex and baffling [to many contemporary readers]. There was a love story with no passionate scenes; there were trenches but no battles; there was a tragedy without a denouement." The novel is about the psychological result of the war on the participants and on society. In his introduction to the third novel, A Man Could Stand Up--, Ford wrote, "This is what the late war was like: this is how modern fighting of the organized, scientific type affects the mind". In December 2010, John N. Gray hailed the work as "possibly the greatest 20th-century novel in English", and Mary Gordon labelled it as "quite simply, the best fictional treatment of war in the history of the novel".

== Background ==
Ford stated that his purpose in creating this work was "the obviating of all future wars". The four novels were originally published under the titles: Some Do Not ... (1924), No More Parades (1925), A Man Could Stand Up — (1926) and Last Post (The Last Post in the USA) (1928); the books were combined into one volume as Parade's End in 1950. In 2012, HBO, BBC and VRT produced a television adaptation, written by Tom Stoppard and starring Benedict Cumberbatch and Rebecca Hall.

== Plot summary ==
The novels chronicle the life of Christopher Tietjens, "the last Tory", a brilliant government statistician from a wealthy landowning family who serves in the British Army during the First World War. His wife Sylvia is a flippant socialite who seems intent on ruining him through her sexual promiscuity. Tietjens may or may not be the father of his wife's child. Meanwhile, his incipient affair with Valentine Wannop, a high-spirited pacifist and women's suffragist, has not been consummated, despite what all their friends believe.

The two central novels follow Tietjens in the army in France and Belgium, as well as Sylvia and Valentine in their separate paths over the course of the war.

== Literary notes ==
Notably among war novels, Tietjens' consciousness takes primacy over the war-events it filters. Ford constructs a protagonist for whom the war is but one layer of his life, and not always even the most prominent even though he is in the middle of it. In a narrative beginning before the war and ending after the armistice, Ford's project is to situate an unimaginable cataclysm within a social, moral, and psychological complexity.

Robie Macauley wrote that "the Tietjens story...is less about the incident of a single war than about a whole era" and its destruction. "Ford took as the scheme for his allegory the life of one man, Christopher Tietjens, a member of an extinct species, which, as he says, 'died out sometime in the 18th century.' Representing in himself the order and stability of another age, he must experience the disruptive present."

The work is also striking in its investigation of the relationship among gender dynamics, war, and societal upheaval. Scholar David Ayers notes that "Parade's End is virtually alone of the male writing of the 1920s in affirming the ascendance of women and advocating a course of graceful withdrawal from dominance for men".

== Textual history ==
Penguin reissued the four novels separately in 1948, just after the Second World War.

The novels were first combined into one volume under the collective title Parade's End (which had been suggested by Ford, although he did not live to see an omnibus version) in the Knopf edition of 1950, which has been the basis of several subsequent reissues.

Graham Greene controversially omitted Last Post from his 1963 Bodley Head edition of Ford's writing, calling it "an afterthought which he (Ford) had not intended to write and later regretted having written." Greene went on to state that "...the Last Post was more than a mistake—it was a disaster, a disaster which has delayed a full critical appreciation of Parade's End." Certainly Last Post is very different from the other three novels; it is concerned with peace and reconstruction, and Christopher Tietjens is absent for most of the narrative, which is structured as a series of interior monologues by those closest to him. Yet it has had influential admirers, from Dorothy Parker and Carl Clinton Van Doren to Anthony Burgess and Malcolm Bradbury (who included it in his 1992 Everyman edition).

Carcanet Press published the first annotated and critical edition of the novels, edited by Max Saunders, Joseph Wiesenfarth, Sara Haslam, and Paul Skinner, in 2010–11.

== Adaptations ==
- Theatre 625: Parade's End (1964), three-part BBC videotaped serial with Ronald Hines and Judi Dench.
- Parade's End (2012), five-part BBC/HBO television serial) by Susanna White, script by Tom Stoppard, starring Benedict Cumberbatch and Rebecca Hall.
