= Ford Madox Ford =

English writer and publisher (1873–1939)

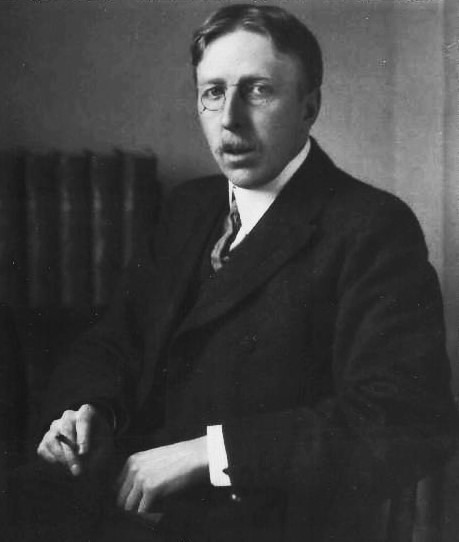
- c. 1905 photo
- Born: Joseph Leopold Ford Hermann Madox Hueffer; 17 December 1873; Merton, Surrey, England
- Died: 26 June 1939 (aged 65); Deauville, France
- Occupations: Novelist, publisher
- Spouse: Elsie Martindale Hueffer (m. 1894)
- Partners: Violet Hunt; Stella Bowen; Janice Biala
- Children: 3
- Parents: Francis Hueffer (father); Catherine Madox Brown (mother)
- Relatives: Oliver Madox Hueffer (brother); Juliet Soskice (sister); Frank Soskice (nephew); Ford Madox Brown (maternal grandfather); Lucy Madox Brown (half-aunt); Olivia Rossetti Agresti (cousin); Johann Hermann Hüffer (paternal grandfather)
- Writing career
- Pen name: Ford Madox Ford
- Period: 1873–1939

Ford Madox Ford (né Joseph Leopold Ford Hermann Madox Hueffer (/ˈhɛfər/ HEF-ər); 17 December 1873 – 26 June 1939) was an English novelist, poet, critic and editor whose journals The English Review and The Transatlantic Review were important in the development of early 20th-century English and American literature.

Ford is now remembered for his novels The Good Soldier (1915), the Parade's End tetralogy (1924–1928) and The Fifth Queen trilogy (1906–1908). The Good Soldier is frequently included among the great literature of the 20th century, including the Modern Library's 100 Best Novels, The Observer's "100 Greatest Novels of All Time", and The Guardian's "1,000 novels everyone must read".

== Early life ==
Ford was born in Merton in Surrey to Catherine Madox Brown and Francis Hueffer, the eldest of three; his brother was Oliver Madox Hueffer and his sister was Juliet Hueffer, the wife of David Soskice and mother of Frank Soskice. Ford's father, who became a music critic for The Times, was German and his mother English. His paternal grandfather Johann Hermann Hüffer was the first to publish the Westphalian poet and author Annette von Droste-Hülshoff. He was named after his maternal grandfather, the Pre-Raphaelite painter Ford Madox Brown, whose biography he would eventually write. His mother's older half-sister was Lucy Madox Brown, the wife of William Michael Rossetti and mother of Olivia Rossetti Agresti.

In 1889, after the death of their father, Ford and Oliver went to live with their grandfather in London. Ford attended the University College School in London, but never studied at university. In November 1892, at 18, he became a Catholic, "very much at the encouragement of some Hueffer relatives, but partly (he confessed) galled by the 'militant atheism and anarchism' of his English cousins."

== Personal life ==
In 1894, Ford eloped with his school girlfriend Elsie Martindale. The couple were married in Gloucester and moved to Bonnington in Kent. In 1901, they moved to Winchelsea. They had two daughters, Christina (born 1897) and Katharine (born 1900). Ford's neighbours in Winchelsea included the authors Joseph Conrad, Stephen Crane, W. H. Hudson, Henry James in nearby Rye, and H. G. Wells.

In 1904, Ford suffered an agoraphobic breakdown due to financial and marital problems. He went to Germany to spend time with family there and undergo treatments.

In 1909, Ford left his wife and set up home with English writer Isobel Violet Hunt, with whom he published the literary magazine The English Review. Ford's wife refused to divorce him and he attempted to become a German citizen to obtain a divorce in Germany. This was unsuccessful. A reference in an illustrated paper to Violet Hunt as "Mrs. Ford Madox Hueffer" gave rise to a successful libel action being brought by Mrs. Elsie Hueffer in 1913. Ford's relationship with Hunt did not survive the First World War.

Ford used the name of Ford Madox Hueffer, but changed it to Ford Madox Ford after World War I in 1919, partly to fulfil the terms of a small legacy, partly "because a Teutonic name is in these days disagreeable", and possibly to avoid further lawsuits from Elsie in the event of his new companion being referred to as "Mrs. Hueffer".

Between 1918 and 1927, he lived with Stella Bowen, an Australian artist 20 years his junior. In 1920, Ford and Bowen had a daughter, Julia Madox Ford.

In the summer of 1927, The New York Times reported that Ford had converted a mill building in Avignon, France into a home and workshop that he called "Le Vieux Moulin". The article implied that Ford was reunited with his wife at this point.

In the early 1930s, Ford established a relationship with Janice Biala, a Polish-born artist from New York, who illustrated several of Ford's later books. This relationship lasted until the late 1930s.

Ford spent the last years of his life teaching at Olivet College in Olivet, Michigan, US. Olivet president Joseph Brewer admired Ford's literary stature and wanted him to contribute to the college's cultural mission. Ford's acceptance was driven by his need for financial stability and his desire to mentor young writers. Robie Macauley who wrote the 1950 introduction to Ford's Parade's End includes his reflections on Ford at Olivet.

Ford was taken ill in Honfleur, France, in June 1939 and died shortly afterward in Deauville at the age of 65.

== Literary life ==
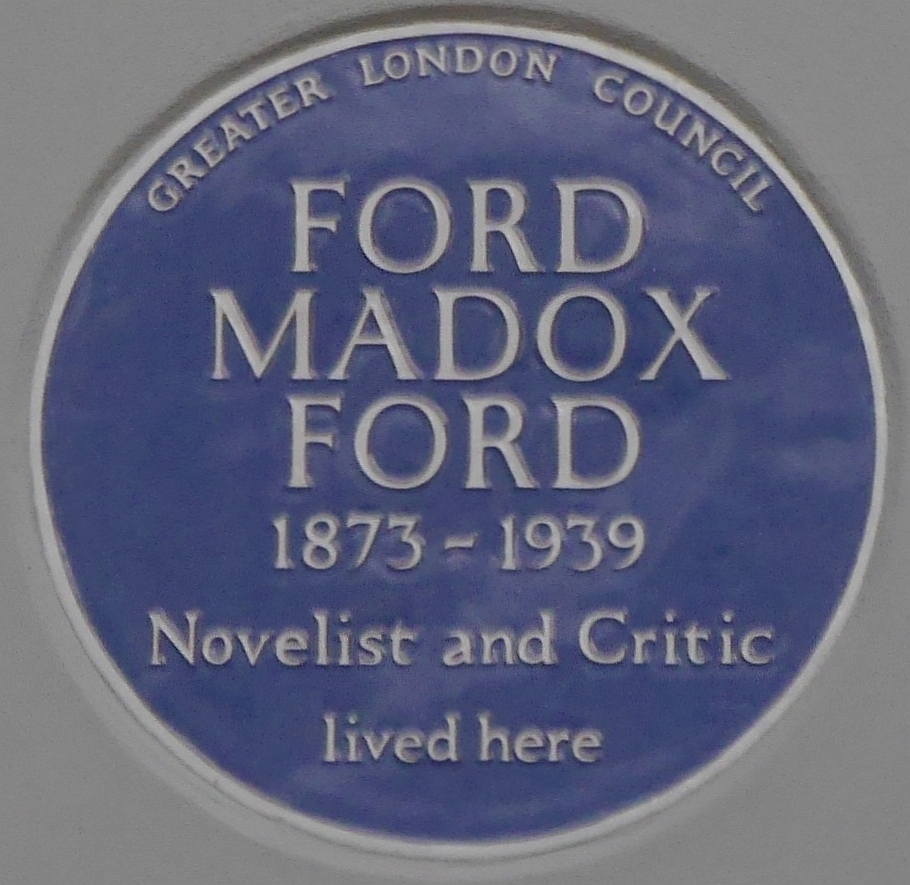
Blue plaque, 80 Campden Hill Road, Kensington, London

One of Ford's most famous works is the novel The Good Soldier (1915). Set just before the First World War, The Good Soldier chronicles the tragic expatriate lives of two "perfect couples", one British and one American, using intricate flashbacks. In the "Dedicatory Letter to Stella Ford" that prefaces the novel, Ford reports that a friend pronounced The Good Soldier "the finest French novel in the English language!" Ford pronounced himself a "Tory mad about historic continuity" and believed the novelist's function was to serve as the historian of his own time. However, he was dismissive of the Conservative Party, referring to it as "the Stupid Party".

Ford was involved in British war propaganda after the beginning of the First World War. He worked for the War Propaganda Bureau, managed by C. F. G. Masterman, along with Arnold Bennett, G. K. Chesterton, John Galsworthy, Hilaire Belloc and Gilbert Murray. Ford wrote two propaganda books for Masterman; When Blood is Their Argument: An Analysis of Prussian Culture (1915), with the help of Richard Aldington, and Between St. Dennis and St. George: A Sketch of Three Civilizations (1915).

After writing the two propaganda books, Ford enlisted at 41 years of age into the Welsh Regiment of the British Army on 30 July 1915. He was sent to France. His combat experiences and his previous propaganda activities inspired his tetralogy Parade's End (1924–1928), set in England and on the Western Front before, during and after the war.

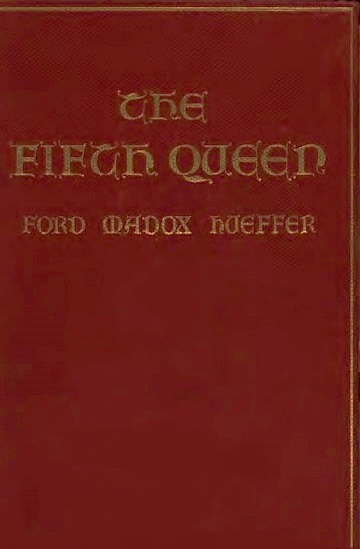
Cover of The Fifth Queen: And How She Came to Court (1906) by Ford Madox Ford, then known as Ford Madox Hueffer

Ford wrote dozens of novels as well as essays, poetry, memoirs and literary criticism. He collaborated with Joseph Conrad on three novels, The Inheritors (1901), Romance (1903) and The Nature of a Crime (1924, although written much earlier). During the three to five years after this direct collaboration, Ford's best known achievement was The Fifth Queen trilogy (1906–1908), historical novels based on the life of Katharine Howard, which Conrad termed, at the time, "the swan song of historical romance." Ford's poem "Antwerp" (1915) was praised by T. S. Eliot as "the only good poem I have met with on the subject of the war".

Ford's novel Ladies Whose Bright Eyes (1911, extensively revised in 1935) is a time travel novel like Twain's classic A Connecticut Yankee in King Arthur's Court, but emphasising the difficulties of recreating modern civilization and without the rewards of such a situation.

When the Spanish Civil War broke out, Ford took the side of the left Republican faction, declaring: "I am unhesitatingly for the existing Spanish Government and against Franco's attempt—on every ground of feeling and reason ... Mr Franco wishes to establish a government resting on the arms of Moors, Germans, Italians. Its success must be contrary to world conscience." His opinion of Mussolini and Hitler was likewise negative, and he offered to sign a manifesto against Nazism.

== Promotion of literature ==
In 1908, Ford founded The English Review. He published works by Thomas Hardy, H. G. Wells, Joseph Conrad, Henry James, May Sinclair, John Galsworthy, and W. B. Yeats; and debuted works of Ezra Pound, Wyndham Lewis, D. H. Lawrence and Norman Douglas. Ezra Pound and other Modernist poets in London in the 1910s particularly valued Ford's poetry as exemplifying treatment of modern subjects in contemporary diction. In 1924, he founded The Transatlantic Review, a journal with great influence on modern literature. Staying with the artistic community in the Latin Quarter of Paris, Ford befriended James Joyce, Ernest Hemingway, Gertrude Stein, Ezra Pound and Jean Rhys, all of whom he would publish (Ford was the model for the character Braddocks in Hemingway's The Sun Also Rises). Poet Basil Bunting worked as Ford's assistant on the magazine.

As a critic, Ford is known for remarking: "Open the book to page ninety-nine and read, and the quality of the whole will be revealed to you." George Seldes, in his book Witness to a Century, describes Ford ("probably in 1932") recalling his writing collaboration with Joseph Conrad, and the lack of acknowledgment by publishers of his status as co-author. Seldes recounts Ford's disappointment with Hemingway: "'and he disowns me now that he has become better known than I am.' Tears now came to Ford's eyes." Ford says, "I helped Joseph Conrad, I helped Hemingway. I helped a dozen, a score of writers, and many of them have beaten me. I'm now an old man and I'll die without making a name like Hemingway." Seldes observes: "At this climax Ford began to sob. Then he began to cry."

Hemingway devoted a chapter of his Parisian memoir A Moveable Feast to an encounter with Ford at a café in Paris during the early 1920s. He describes Ford "as upright as an ambulatory, well clothed, up-ended hogshead."

During a later sojourn in the United States, Ford was involved with Allen Tate, Caroline Gordon, Katherine Anne Porter and Robert Lowell (who was then a student). Ford was always a champion of new literature and literary experimentation. In 1929, he published The English Novel: From the Earliest Days to the Death of Joseph Conrad, a brisk and accessible overview of the history of English novels. He had an affair with Jean Rhys that ended acrimoniously, which Rhys fictionalised in her 1928 novel Quartet.

== Reception ==
Ford is best remembered for his novels The Good Soldier (1915), the Parade's End tetralogy (1924–1928) and The Fifth Queen trilogy (1906–1908). The Good Soldier is frequently included among the great literature of the 20th century, including the Modern Library 100 Best Novels, The Observer's "100 Greatest Novels of All Time", and The Guardian's "1000 novels everyone must read". The Parade's End tetralogy was made into an acclaimed BBC/HBO five-part TV series in 2012, starring Benedict Cumberbatch and scripted by Tom Stoppard.

Anthony Burgess described Ford as the "greatest British novelist" of the 20th century. Graham Greene was also a great admirer, and more recently Julian Barnes, who has written essays about Ford and his work. Professor Max Saunders is the author of an authoritative biography of Ford, published in two volumes by Oxford University Press in 1996, followed up by a single volume focusing on two of Ford's novels, The Good Soldier (1915), the Parade's End tetralogy (1924–1928), in 2023. Saunders has also edited some of Ford's oeuvre reissued by the Carcanet Press.

== Selected works ==
- The Shifting of the Fire, as H. Ford Hueffer, Unwin, 1892.
- The Questions at the Well as Fenil Haig, 1893
- The Brown Owl, as H. Ford Hueffer, Unwin, 1892.
- The Queen Who Flew: A Fairy Tale, Bliss Sands & Foster, 1894.
- Ford Madox Brown : a record of his life and work, as H. Ford Hueffer, Longmans, Green, 1896.
- The Cinque Ports, Blackwood, 1900.
- The Inheritors: An Extravagant Story, Joseph Conrad and Ford M. Hueffer, Heinemann, 1901.
- Rossetti, Duckworth, [1902].
- Romance, Joseph Conrad and Ford M. Hueffer, Smith Elder, 1903.
- The Benefactor, Langham, 1905.
- The Soul of London: A Survey of the Modern City, Alston Rivers, 1905.
- The Heart of the Country: A Survey of a Modern Land, Alston Rivers, 1906.
- The Fifth Queen (Part One of The Fifth Queen trilogy), Alston Rivers, 1906.
- Privy Seal (Part Two of The Fifth Queen trilogy), Alston Rivers, 1907.
- The Spirit of the People: An Analysis of the English Mind, Alston Rivers, 1907.
- An English Girl, Methuen, 1907.
- The Fifth Queen Crowned (Part Three of The Fifth Queen trilogy), Nash, 1908.
- Mr Apollo, Methuen, 1908.
- The Half Moon, Nash, 1909.
- A Call, Chatto, 1910.
- The Portrait, Methuen, 1910.
- The Critical Attitude, as Ford Madox Hueffer, Duckworth 1911.
- The Simple Life Limited, as Daniel Chaucer, Lane, 1911.
- Ladies Whose Bright Eyes, Constable, 1911 (extensively revised in 1935).
- The Panel: A Sheer Comedy, Constable, 1912 (published in the U.S. as Ring for Nancy: A Sheer Comedy).
- The New Humpty Dumpty, as Daniel Chaucer, Lane, 1912.
- Henry James, Secker, 1913.
- Mr Fleight, Latimer, 1913.
- The Young Lovell, Chatto, 1913.
- Antwerp (eight-page poem), The Poetry Bookshop, 1915.
- Henry James, A Critical Study (1915).
- Between St. Dennis and St. George, Hodder, 1915.
- The Good Soldier, Lane, 1915.
- Zeppelin Nights, with Violet Hunt, Lane, 1915.
- The Marsden Case, Duckworth, 1923.
- Women and Men, Paris, 1923.
- Mr Bosphorous, Duckworth, 1923.
- The Nature of a Crime, with Joseph Conrad, Duckworth, 1924.
- Joseph Conrad, A Personal Remembrance, Little, Brown and Company, 1924.
- Some Do Not . . . (first in Parade's End tetralogy), Duckworth, 1924.
- No More Parades, Duckworth, 1925.
- A Man Could Stand Up --, Duckworth, 1926.
- A Mirror To France. Duckworth. 1926
- New York is Not America, Duckworth, 1927.
- New York Essays, Rudge, 1927.
- New Poems, Rudge, 1927.
- Last Post (fourth in Parade's End tetralogy), Duckworth, 1928.
- A Little Less Than Gods, Duckworth, [1928].
- No Enemy, Macaulay, 1929.
- The English Novel: From the Earliest Days to the Death of Joseph Conrad (One Hour Series), Lippincott, 1929; Constable, 1930.
- Return to Yesterday, Liveright, 1932.
- When the Wicked Man, Cape, 1932.
- The Rash Act, Cape, 1933.
- It Was the Nightingale, Lippincott, 1933.
- Henry for Hugh, Lippincott, 1934.
- Provence, Unwin, 1935.
- Ladies Whose Bright Eyes (revised version), 1935
- Portraits from Life: Memories and Criticism of Henry James, Joseph Conrad, Thomas Hardy, H.G. Wells, Stephen Crane, D. H. Lawrence, John Galsworthy, Ivan Turgenev, W. H. Hudson, Theodore Dreiser, A. C. Swinburne, Boston: Houghton Mifflin Company, 1937.
- Great Trade Route, OUP, 1937.
- Vive Le Roy, Unwin, 1937.
- The March of Literature, Dial, 1938.
- Selected Poems, Randall, 1971.
- Your Mirror to My Times, Holt, 1971.
- A History of Our Own Times, Indiana University Press, 1988.
