= Maria Skibniewska =

Polish translator

- Born: May 3, 1904; Warsaw, Poland
- Died: October 28, 1984 (aged 80); Warsaw
- Burial place: Powązki Military Cemetery
- Occupation: translator
- Honours: Cross of Merit; Medal of the 10th Anniversary of People's Poland

Maria Skibniewska (née Skibińska; 3 May 1904 - 28 October 1984) was a Polish translator, primarily of English- and French-language literary fiction works.

She graduated from the Cecylia Plater-Zyberkówna High School and studied Polish literature at the University of Warsaw. Her studies in Romance languages were interrupted by World War II, during which she worked as a home-based weaver and survived the Warsaw Uprising. After the war, she worked as a clerk and in 1947 made her debut as a translator of literary fiction. She also served as a translator during the trial of the Auschwitz camp personnel in Kraków (1947) and at the World Congress of Intellectuals in Defense of Peace in Wrocław (1948).

From 1950 to 1971, she worked at the Czytelnik Publishing House, initially as a stylistic proofreader and later as the head of the Romance languages literature department. Throughout this time, and during her retirement, she focused on translations, primarily of literary fiction. She translated around 100 books into Polish, including works by Jean Genet, Graham Greene, Henry James, Thomas Wolfe, Bruce Marshall, William Saroyan, J. R. R. Tolkien, John Updike, and Patrick White. She was highly regarded for her translation work.

Her older brother was Franciszek Skibiński, later a divisional general of the Polish People's Army, and her husband was engineer Stanisław Skibiński, an officer in the Home Army and a Warsaw Uprising participant (codenamed Cubryna).

== Biography ==
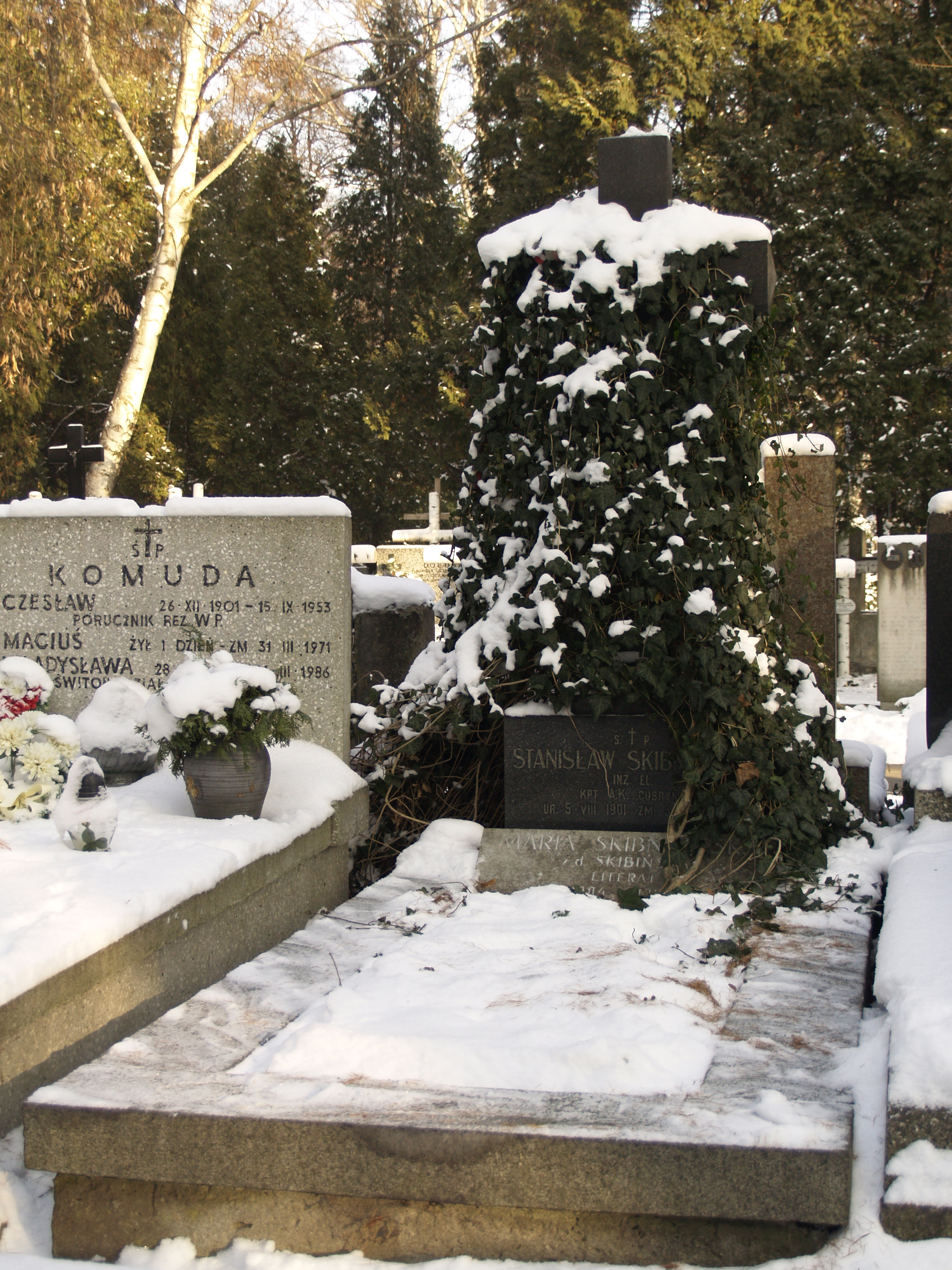
Tombstone of Maria and Stanisław Skibniewski at the Powązki Military Cemetery

Maria Skibińska was born on 3 May 1904. Her father, Władysław, was a civil servant who worked at the Ministry of Finance from 1920 and was previously involved in fine arts. Her mother, Zofia née Królikowski, taught at secondary schools in Warsaw. Maria had three siblings: two brothers, Franciszek, who later became a divisional general in the Polish People's Army, and Józef, an aviator who died in 1939, as well as a sister.

She attended the Cecylia Plater-Zyberkówna High School in Warsaw, where she passed her humanities maturity exam in 1922. She then began studying Polish philology at the University of Warsaw. On 18 September 1928, she married Stanisław Skibiński, (Note: She met him towards the end of high school (Umiński (2022, p. 201)).) an electrical engineer, and, having interrupted her studies, moved with him to Baden, Switzerland, where he was undergoing professional training and where they lived until 1930. She completed her Polish studies at the University of Warsaw that same year, after returning to Poland. Her thesis was dedicated to realism in the works of Honoré de Balzac and Joseph Conrad. In 1936, due to her husband's work, she moved with him to Sweden. A year later, Stanisław was appointed technical director of the Warsaw Power Plant in Powiśle and later became its deputy director general. At the same time (in 1937), Maria began studying Romance languages at the University of Warsaw. It is also known that before the outbreak of World War II, she was a member of the Polish Red Cross and the Polish Tatra Society. In the 1930s, she worked for a year at the Cecylia Plater-Zyberkówna High School.

She never completed her Romance studies, as they were interrupted by the German invasion of Poland. Fleeing from the war, Skibniewska went to Hungary and Romania, but returned to Warsaw in 1939; she lived there throughout the occupation and worked at home as a weaver. Her husband fought in the September campaign. After the regular fighting ended, he returned to his previous position at the power plant and became its director in March 1942. He was also involved in the resistance against the occupier, serving as an officer of the Home Army (with the codename Cubryna) and co-organizing a unit of the Home Army's Security Service in that area, later fighting in the Warsaw Uprising. After the defeat, he ended up in officer prisoner-of-war camps in Bergen-Belsen and Stalag X-B, while Maria found herself in Głogoczów near Kraków.

After the war, she initially supported herself by working as a secretary, later becoming a personnel officer at the Boiler Industry Association, possibly in Kraków. In 1946, she took a job in Warsaw in the foreign monitoring department of Polskie Radio. The following year, she moved to Wrocław, where her husband got a job at the Social Construction Company. That same year marked Maria's debut as a translator: (Note: She knew English from home, where she was taught by a private tutor, as well as from school. In addition to English, she spoke French, and to a much lesser extent, also Russian and German (Umiński (2022, pp. 197–198, 203)).) the publishing house Awir from Katowice published her translation of James Hilton's novel Lost Horizons. Soon after, she returned to Warsaw, where she briefly worked as an import officer at the Rolling Bearings Bureau Polimex.

She was employed twice as a translator – in 1947 during the trial of the Auschwitz camp personnel, which took place in Kraków, and in August 1948 during the World Congress of Intellectuals in Defense of Peace in Wrocław. In September of the same year, she was charged with espionage on behalf of the United States and was imprisoned for some time; her husband faced the same fate. Within the family, the arrest of the Skibniewskis was linked to her work at the congress.

In February 1950, Skibniewska was hired by the Czytelnik Publishing House as a stylistic editor. The change of job was associated with the arrest and trial of her brother, Franciszek. She remained associated with Czytelnik, where she later led the editorial office of Romance literature, until her retirement, which she entered on 31 July 1971. Throughout this time (and during her retirement), Skibniewska continued her translation work; since her debut, she translated nearly 100 works from English and French. In 1956, she was admitted to the Polish Writers' Union. She was also valued for her editorial work; in 1957, Zbigniew Bieńkowski noted that she contributed significantly to Polish Romance studies in this area. In the 1950s, she led the reissue of Balzac's La Comédie humaine series.

While working at Czytelnik, she formed close relationships and friendships with translators Anna Przedpełska-Trzeciakowska and Eligia Bąkowska. Relatives and colleagues remembered her as an educated, cultured, and elegant woman who spoke impeccable Polish. As a supervisor, she was quite strict, limiting contacts to official matters without being overly familiar. At the same time, she could show sympathy and joke. She successfully combined her translation work, often with difficult and ambitious titles, with editorial duties, which was seen as a reflection of a developed work ethic, passion, and a way of adapting to post-war reality. In her interactions with people, she avoided political topics directly, concealing her dislike for the communist government, only giving her interlocutors a hint of her views. During the martial law period, she reacted very poorly to her brother's involvement in the Patriotic Movement for National Rebirth, which affected their relationship. Her relative was the translator Małgorzata Targowska-Grabińska, who lived with her for several years in her youth.

Maria Skibniewska became a widow in 1958 and had no children with her husband. Over the years, she faced increasing vision problems that led to gradual loss of sight. She died on 28 October 1984. She was buried at the Powązki Military Cemetery in Warsaw. (Note: As reported by Cmentarz Wojskowy, the grave is located in section A29-2-14, while Derdziński (2009) gives A29-2-16 as the correct location.)

== Translation work ==
=== General characteristics ===
Maria Skibniewska made her debut as a translator with a work classified as popular literature – Lost Horizon by James Hilton. However, she quickly moved on to translating notable authors, beginning with Dolores by H. G. Wells, which was published in Poland in 1948. Among the other writers whose works she translated are Frederick Buechner, G. K. Chesterton, Joseph Conrad, Lawrence Durrell, Maurice Druon, William Faulkner, Graham Greene, Henry James, Bruce Marshall, Guy de Maupassant, Flannery O'Connor, J. D. Salinger, William Saroyan, J. R. R. Tolkien, Thomas Wolfe, John Updike, and Nathanael West. She developed an affinity for some of these authors, as evidenced by her translations of multiple works from certain writers. One of her favorite authors was Patrick White, the Australian Nobel laureate of 1973. While she primarily translated novels and short stories from English or French, her body of work also included books on different subjects such as biographies, historical studies, several plays by Jean Genet, and articles on theater by Edward Gordon Craig, Paul Claudel, Jacques Copeau, and G. B. Shaw. Some of these translations may reflect her interest in painting and theater arts.

Skibniewska was highly regarded for her translations. The criticism repeatedly emphasized her contributions to Polish literary translation and the quality of her work, and her entire body of work can be described as impressive. Jarosław Iwaszkiewicz, commenting on her translation of Halldór Laxness' novel, wrote: "The richness of the language, the beauty and simplicity of the syntax, the excellent Polish – all this makes Independent People a very valuable literary work. The translation was made from English, but it is excellent". A positive assessment of Dolores was given by Zdzisław Najder in 1957, and in later years, Henryk Krzeczkowski and Alina Szala (1974) described Skibniewska as an outstanding translator, placing her among the best in Poland. Her translation of White's The Eye of the Storm was awarded the title of the best-translated book of 1976 by Literatura na Świecie magazine in 1977. Jerzy Lisowski, who collaborated with her on the translation of Genet's plays, called her his mentor.

Despite her accomplishments as a translator and editor and her esteem within the literary community, she did not seek fame. During a meeting of the Polish Writers' Union Translation Section with Julian Rogoziński (on 5 May 1953), with whom she worked on Balzac's Human Comedy, she spoke only once, at the request of the meeting's host. Little about her appeared in the press, and she gave only one interview for the magazine Nowe Książki (issue no. 2, 1972), where she discussed the publishing plans related to Latin American literature without any personal touches. The only translation she accompanied with a broader commentary was The Portrait of a Lady by Henry James, for which she wrote an erudite introduction.

Skibniewska's translations were reissued and discussed for many years after her death. Among those who praised her work were Marek Paryż and Maciej Płaza. However, Krzysztof Majer, in an essay on Polish translations of Flannery O'Connor, critically engaged with some of Skibniewska's choices (particularly regarding a certain conservatism in translating dialogue), while also acknowledging her descriptive skill.

=== Translator of Tolkien ===
The first book by J. R. R. Tolkien that Maria Skibniewska translated was The Hobbit, published in Polish in 1960 by Iskry Publishers. She signed the contract for the translation of The Lord of the Rings with Czytelnik in 1958. There are no records detailing the course of her work. However, it is known that in June 1959, she wrote a letter to Allen & Unwin, asking for guidance to assist her with the translation, which was forwarded to Tolkien. He promised a prompt response, but due to family issues, he took a long time to reply. It wasn't until after reminders from Czytelnik that he provided some general advice, which was sent to Skibniewska. There is no evidence of any direct correspondence between the author and the Polish translator, but it is possible that her letter, forwarded to Tolkien, is preserved in his archives at the Bodleian Library.

The three volumes of The Lord of the Rings translated by Skibniewska were published in 1961, 1962, and 1963, with the majority of the poems in the novel not translated by her (Note: One of those she translated was a poem about the Rings of Power (Umiński (2022, pp. 268–269)).) but by Włodzimierz Lewik (volumes I–II) and Andrzej Nowicki (volume III). This was the third translation of Tolkien's work into a foreign language, following Dutch and Swedish.

When Lech Jęczmyk, the editor of the English section at Czytelnik, initiated work on a second edition of The Lord of the Rings as well as the Polish publication of The Silmarillion, Skibniewska, despite health issues, engaged in both tasks. She made several corrections to her translation while simultaneously working on translating another Tolkien title. Additionally, she revised the text for the new edition of The Hobbit. The second edition of The Lord of the Rings was published in 1981, while The Silmarillion came out posthumously in 1985, alongside the second edition of The Hobbit.

Skibniewska's translations are regarded as faithful to the original and well-capturing the style and language of the author, although they are not without certain errors. In the case of The Hobbit, as noted by Michał Leśniewski, an expert on Tolkien's works, a significant drawback was that during preparations for the second edition, the translator did not take into account several minor changes that Tolkien made to the novel, limiting herself to translating only one chapter that the author had entirely revised. Consequently, the first complete Polish translation of The Hobbit, incorporating all of the author's changes, was done by Paulina Braiter-Ziemkiewicz.

Conversely, Skibniewska's translation of The Lord of the Rings is considered excellent or even nearly congruent, capturing Tolkien's elevated tone while maintaining his fluent style, making it very readable. It is regarded as the best available translation, often described as the most beautiful. The high quality of her work was partly due to the fact that she worked without haste; she had almost a year for each volume, which was a comfortable situation compared to the working conditions of authors of subsequent translations. (Note: Later translations of the novel were done by Jerzy Łoziński, published in 1996–1997, and by Maria and Cezary Frąc in 2001–2002 (in the case of volume III, the translations of individual parts were done by Aleksandra Januszewska, Aleksandra Jagiełowicz, and Ryszard Derdziński) (Gumkowski (2002, p. 8); Lichański (2003, pp. 17, 182)).) Skibniewska's work is viewed as the canonical version of the novel in Polish. Among the English philologists who expressed high regard for her translation were Przemysław Mroczkowski, Andrzej Zgorzelski, and Agnieszka Sylwanowicz. It also served as the basis for the Polish translation of Peter Jackson's The Lord of the Rings film.

In her work on The Lord of the Rings, Skibniewska only partially adhered to the author's suggestions. (Note: Tolkien stated as a general principle to translate or change names as rarely as possible, because "(...) it is an English book and its Englishness should not be obscured". Accordingly, character names and place names, such as The Shire, should not be translated. The author suggested including a list of English names with Polish explanations at the end of the novel (Tolkien (2010, p. 486)).) She retained the English names of hobbits, whereas she translated some place names into Polish, especially those with clear meanings, thereby introducing the term Śródziemie (Middle-earth) into Polish. Her choice to use the word krasnolud (dwarf), a diminutive form of krasnoludek. (Note: Umiński (2022, p. 245) states that in the first edition of The Hobbit, the term "krasnoludek" was still used. In contrast, Poradecki (2015, p. 117) notes that at that time the term "krasnolud" was already used.) She drew it from volume III of Słownik języka polskiego (Dictionary of the Polish Language) edited by Witold Doroszewski, where an example of its use was cited from part II of Noce i dnie (Nights and Days) by Maria Dąbrowska. (Note: "...Ms. Barbara and Agnisia took turns standing by both windows of Czynkle's shop. In one of them, a terracotta dwarf (krasnolud) was pouring out an entire river of dried fruits from a cornucopia" (Umiński (2022, p. 245)).) The purpose of this approach was to distinguish characters from Tolkien's works from the small beings found in fairy tales. Some omissions in her translation may have stemmed from censorship, while others were conscious choices, such as the exclusion of appendices D and E in the third volume (on calendars and alphabets), which she considered potentially confusing for Polish readers.

In 1996, Muza published a new edition of the novel, prepared under the editorship of Marek Gumkowski, an expert on Tolkien's works. Skibniewska's translation received several corrections and additions in this edition. Both ordinary errors and modifications of certain formulations, which proved incorrect in light of Tolkien's later legacy published many years after the novel, were addressed. Some translations of the poems by Włodzimierz Lewik were replaced with new translations by Tadeusz A. Olszański, and the previously untranslated appendices D and E were translated by Ryszard Derdziński. Diacritical marks were added throughout the text, as well as in words from the languages of elves or humans invented by the author, with distinctions in the notation of the sounds k and f using the letters c, k, f, or ph. However, due to the haste surrounding this edition, not all details worth correcting were identified. In subsequent editions, Muza chose not to implement further modifications to the translation to eliminate remaining errors or inaccuracies.

Skibniewska's translation of The Silmarillion also received positive reviews. Agnieszka Sylwanowicz noted that Skibniewska employed language that evokes biblical style associations in the reader, which is not entirely consistent with the author's tone. The translation itself, as pointed out by Michał Leśniewski, was not fully prepared, but the publisher initially released it without the necessary corrections.

== List of translations ==
=== English literature ===
Author	Title	Year released (Note: The first in Skibniewska's translation.)	Publisher, notes
Gillian Avery	Echo dawnych lat. Wspomnienia z młodości w okresie regencji i panowania królowej Wiktorii (The Echoing Green. Memories of Regency and Victorian Youth)	1979	Nasza Księgarnia
Gilbert Keith Chesterton	Człowiek, który był Czwartkiem (The Man Who Was Thursday)	1958	Pax Publishing House, novel published with Koszmar (The Nightmare)
Gilbert Keith Chesterton	Koszmar (The Nightmare)	1958	Pax Publishing House, novel published with Człowiek, który był Czwartkiem
Gilbert Keith Chesterton	Pisma wybrane (Selected Writings)	1975	Znak, one of the translations in the anthology
Gilbert Keith Chesterton	Kula i krzyż (The Ball and the Cross)	1992	Pax Publishing House, novel
Joseph Conrad	Wśród prądów (Within the Tides)	1974	State Publishing Institute PIW, vol. 17 of Dzieła J. Conrada
Lawrence George Durrell	Kwartet aleksandryjski: (The Alexandria Quartet:) Justyna (Justine) Balthasar (Balthazar) Mountolive Clea	1971–1975	Czytelnik Publishing House, series of novels
David Edgar	Przeznaczenie (Destiny)	1978	drama, published in Dialog magazine
James Gordon Farrell	Oblężenie Krisznapuru (The Siege of Krishnapur)	1979	Czytelnik Publishing House, novel
William Golding	Siłą bezwładu (Note: In later editions titled Siła bezwładu.) (Free Fall)	1970	Pax Publishing House, novel
Graham Greene	Nasz człowiek w Hawanie (Our Man in Havana)	1960	Pax Publishing House, novel
Graham Greene	Tchórz (The Man Within)	1962	Pax Publishing House, novel included in Dwie opowieści (other title: Tajny agent translated by Ewa Życieńska)
Graham Greene	Poczucie rzeczywistości (The Sense of Reality)	1964	Pax Publishing House, one of the translations in the anthology
Graham Greene	Komedianci (The Comedians)	1966	Pax Publishing House, novel
Sean O'Hanlon	Kamień, co się toczy... Życiorys własny nieco ubarwiony (The Rolling Stone: A Slightly Embellished Autobiography)	1961	Czytelnik Publishing House, novel
James Hilton	Zagubione dni (Random Harvest)	1947	Awir, novel
Bruce Marshall	Ale i oni otrzymali po denarze (To Every Man a Penny)	1958	Pax Publishing House, novel
Bruce Marshall	Paryżowi podzwonne (Yellow Tapers for Paris)	1961	Pax Publishing House, novel
Bruce Marshall	Czerwony kapelusz (A Thread of Scarlet)	1962	Pax Publishing House, novel
Robert Player	Gdzie się podziały kolczyki Krwawej Mary? Tajemnice dworu królowej (Oh! Where are Bloody Mary's earrings?)	1976	Czytelnik Publishing House, novel
Alan Sillitoe	Samotność długodystansowca (The Loneliness of the Long-Distance Runner)	1964	State Publishing Institute PIW, short story
J. R. R. Tolkien	Hobbit, czyli tam i z powrotem (The Hobbit, or There and Back Again)	1960	Iskry, novel, poems translated by Włodzimierz Lewik
J. R. R. Tolkien	Władca Pierścieni: (The Lord of the Rings: ) Wyprawa (Note: The title was corrected to Drużyna Pierścienia starting from the 1996 edition (Umiński (2022, pp. 267, 272)).) (The Fellowship of the Ring) Dwie wieże (The Two Towers) Powrót króla (The Return of the King)	1961−1963 1961 1962 1963	Czytelnik Publishing House, novel in 3 volumes, poems translated by W. Lewik (vol. I–II) and Andrzej Nowicki (vol. III)
J. R. R. Tolkien	Rudy Dżil i jego pies (Farmer Giles of Ham)	1962	Iskry
J. R. R. Tolkien	Kowal z Podlesia Większego (Smith of Wootton Major)	1980	Iskry, published together with Rudy Dżil i jego pies
J. R. R. Tolkien	Silmarillion (The Silmarillion)	1985	Czytelnik Publishing House, short stories
Herbert George Wells	Dolores (Apropos of Dolores)	1948	Awir, novel
–	Życie innych ludzi. Opowiadania angielskie (The Lives of Other People. English Short Stories)	1967	Pax Publishing House, one of the translations in the anthology

=== American literature ===
Author	Title	Year released	Publisher, notes
–	26 współczesnych opowiadań amerykańskich (26 Contemporary American Short Stories)	1963	Iskry, one of the translations in the anthology
Frederick Buechner	Kraina lwów (Lion Country)	1974	State Publishing Institute PIW, novel
Jetta Carleton	Księżycowe kwiaty (The Moonflower Vine)	1966	Czytelnik Publishing House, novel
Lloyd C. Douglas	Szata (The Robe)	1976	Pax Publishing House, novel
Edwin O'Connor	Oścień smutku (The Edge of Sadness)	1965	Pax Publishing House, novel
Flannery O'Connor	Trudno o dobrego człowieka (A Good Man Is Hard to Find)	1970	State Publishing Institute PIW, collection of short stories (Note: Reprinted multiple times under different titles, but with the same translations by Skibniewska (Umiński (2022, p. 280)).)
Flannery O'Connor	W pierścieniu ognia (A Circle in the Fire)	1975	State Publishing Institute PIW, short stories
Flannery O'Connor	Sztuczny Murzyn. Opowiadania (The Artificial Black Man: Stories)	1992	–
–	Dyliżansem przez prerię. Opowiadania z Dzikiego Zachodu (By Stagecoach Across the Prairie: Western Short Stories)	1965	Iskry, one of the translations in the anthology
William Faulkner	Miasto (The Town)	1966	Czytelnik Publishing House, novel
Francis Bret Harte	Trzech włóczęgów z Trinidad (Soldiers Three)	1955	Czytelnik Publishing House, one of the translations in the anthology
Henry James	Ambasadorowie (The Ambassadors)	1960	Czytelnik Publishing House, novel in 2 volumes
Henry James	Madonna przyszłości i inne opowiadania (The Madonna of the Future and Other Stories)	1962	State Publishing Institute PIW, short stories
Henry James	Portret damy (The Portrait of a Lady)	1977	Czytelnik Publishing House, novel
–	Rekord Johna Cucu. Antologia postępowej noweli amerykańskiej (John Cucu's Record: Anthology of Progressive American Novella)	1956	Czytelnik Publishing House, one of the translations in the anthology
Craig Rice	Róże pani Cherington (Home sweet homicide)	1958	Iskry, novel
J. D. Salinger	Buszujący w zbożu (The Catcher in the Rye)	1961	Iskry, novel
J. D. Salinger	Franny i Zooey (Franny and Zooey)	1966	Czytelnik Publishing House, short stories
J. D. Salinger	Wyżej podnieście strop, cieśle (Raise High the Roof Beam, Carpenters and Seymour)	1966	Czytelnik Publishing House, short story published with Seymour: Introdukcja
J. D. Salinger	Seymour: Introdukcja (Seymour: An Introduction)	1966	Czytelnik Publishing House, short story published with Wyżej podnieście strop, cieśle
William Saroyan	Własne życie (Here Comes, There Goes You Know Who)	1963	Pax Publishing House, memoir
William Saroyan	Troje w Paryżu (Not dying)	1966	Pax Publishing House, memoir
Jean Stafford	Zły charakter (The Collected Stories of Jean Stafford)	1976	State Publishing Institute PIW, short story published in a collection (same title), all other texts translated by Ewa Krasińska
Colin Stuart	Zatrzymać wiatr (Shoot an arrow to stop the wind)	1975	Iskry, novel
Booth Tarkington	Penrod	1963	Iskry, novel
John Updike	Farma (Of the Farm)	1967	State Publishing Institute PIW, novel
John Updike	Muzea i kobiety oraz inne opowiadania (Museums and Women and Other Stories)	1978	State Publishing Institute PIW, short stories
Nathanael West	Dzień szarańczy (The Day of the Locust)	1963	Czytelnik Publishing House, novel published with Miss Lonelyhearts
Nathanael West	Miss Lonelyhearts	1963	Czytelnik Publishing House, novel published with Dzień szarańczy
Frances Winwar	Nawiedzony gród (Haunted Palace)	1961	State Publishing Institute PIW, novel
Thomas Wolfe	Nie ma powrotu (You Can't Go Home Again)	1959	Czytelnik Publishing House, novel

=== Australian literature ===
Author	Title	Year released	Publisher, notes
–	I drzewa mówią. Opowiadania australijskie (And the Trees Speak. Australian Short Stories)	1954	Czytelnik Publishing House, one of the translations in the anthology
Patrick White	Wóz ognisty (Riders in the Chariot)	1965	State Publishing Institute PIW, novel in 2 volumes
Patrick White	Żywi i umarli (The Living and the Dead)	1966	State Publishing Institute PIW, novel
Patrick White	Węzeł (The Solid Mandala)	1968	State Publishing Institute PIW, novel
Patrick White	Wiwisekcja (The Vivisector)	1973	State Publishing Institute PIW, novel
Patrick White	Oko cyklonu (The Eye of the Storm)	1976	State Publishing Institute PIW, novel
Patrick White	Voss	1979	State Publishing Institute PIW, novel
Patrick White	Przepaska z liści (A Fringe of Leaves)	1980	State Publishing Institute PIW, novel
Patrick White	Drzewo człowiecze (The Tree of Man)	1985	State Publishing Institute PIW, novel

=== French literature ===
Author	Title	Year released	Publisher, notes
Pierre Courtade	Jimmy	1953	Czytelnik Publishing House, novel
Maurice Druon	Potentaci (The Possessors)	1962	State Publishing Institute PIW, novel
Jean Genet	Murzyni. Błazenada (The Blacks: A Clown Show)	1961	Dramatic work in 1 act, co-translation with Jerzy Lisowski, published in Dialog
Jean Genet	Parawany (The Screens)	1964	Dramatic work, co-translation with Jerzy Lisowski, published in Dialog
Jean Genet	Ścisły nadzór (Deathwatch)	1965	Dramatic work, published in Dialog
Jean Genet	Balkon (The Balcony)	1970	State Publishing Institute PIW, novel, co-translation with Jerzy Lisowski, in Teatr
Joseph Majault	Dzień powszedni wikarego (A Vicar's Ordinary Day)	1971	Pax Publishing House, novel
Françoise Mallet-Joris	Znaki (The Signs)	1969	Pax Publishing House, novel
Françoise Mallet-Joris	Kłamstwa (Lies)	1970	Pax Publishing House, novel
Françoise Mallet-Joris	Trzy wieki ciemności. Historie czarownic (Three Centuries of Darkness. Witch Stories)	1971	Pax Publishing House, short stories
Françoise Mallet-Joris	Papierowy dom (The Paper House)	1980	Pax Publishing House, novel
Guy de Maupassant	Mont-Oriol	1955	Czytelnik Publishing House, novel
Armand Salacrou	Ruch jednokierunkowy (One-Way Traffic)	1970	Psychodrama, published in Dialog

=== Canadian literature ===
Author	Title	Year released	Publisher, notes
Margaret Craven	Słyszałem wołanie sowy (I Heard the Owl Call My Name)	1977	Pax Publishing House, novel
William Robertson Davies	Piąta osoba dramatu (Fifth Business)	1973	Pax Publishing House, novel
William Robertson Davies	Mantykora (The Manticore)	1988	State Publishing Institute PIW, novel
William Robertson Davies	Świat czarów (World of Wonders)	1989	State Publishing Institute PIW, co-translation with Zofia Zinserling
Gratien Gélinas	Sami porządni ludzie (Bousille and the Just)	1979	Drama, co-translation with Jerzy Lisowski, published in Dialog
Brian Moore	Odpowiedź z otchłani (An Answer From Limbo)	1969	Pax Publishing House, novel
Brian Moore	Jestem Mary Dunne (I Am Mary Dunne)	1971	Pax Publishing House, novel

=== Other world literature ===
Author	Title	Year released	Publisher, notes
Chinua Achebe	Boża strzała (Arrow of God)	1966	Pax Publishing House, novel
Mulk Raj Anand	Kulis: powieść (Coolie)	1950	Czytelnik Publishing House
Mulk Raj Anand	Idylla kaszmirska i inne opowiadania (Kashmiri Idyll and Other Stories)	1955	Czytelnik Publishing House, one of the translations in an anthology
Mongo Beti	Król cudem ocalony (King Lazarus)	1975	Pax Publishing House, novel
Hubert Lampo	Powrót Joachima Stillera (The Coming of Joachim Stiller)	1979	Pax Publishing House, translated from the English version, originally written in Dutch
Halldór Laxness	Niezależni. Saga islandzkiej doliny (Independent People)	1956	Czytelnik Publishing House, translated from the English version, originally written in Icelandic
James Ngugi	Ziarno pszeniczne (A Grain of Wheat)	1972	Pax Publishing House, novel
Maria Rosseels	Obietnica Sabiny (Sabina's Promise)	1974	Pax Publishing House, translated from the French version, originally written in Dutch
Francis Selormey	Wąska ścieżka (The Narrow Path)	1971	Pax Publishing House, novel

=== Various works ===
Author	Title	Year released	Publisher, notes
–	Baśnie i legendy Wysp Brytyjskich (Fairy Tales and Legends of the British Isles)	1985	Nasza Księgarnia, one of the translations in an anthology
Paul Claudel	Możliwości teatru (Theatre Possibilities)	1971	Art and Film Publishing House, selection of articles
Jacques Copeau	Naga scena (The Naked Stage)	1972	Art and Film Publishing House, selection of articles
Edward Craig	Gordon Craig: historia życia (Gordon Craig: The Story of His Life)	1976	State Publishing Institute PIW, biography
Edward G. Craig	O sztuce teatru (On the Art of the Theatre)	1964	Art and Film Publishing House, selection of articles
Jean Héritier	Katarzyna Medycejska (Catherine de' Medici)	1981	State Publishing Institute PIW, biography
Ronald Hewitt	Ziemia drży (The Earth Trembles)	1964	Iskry
–	Komuna (Commune)	1973	Collective work of The Performance Group by Richard Schechner, published in Dialog, songs translated by Wojciech Młynarski
–	Legendy Indian kanadyjskich (Legends of the Canadian Indians)	1982	Nasza Księgarnia, stories edited by Ella Elizabeth Clark
Jacques Faizant, Jacques Loew	Przypowieści i obrazki (Parables and Pictures)	1982	Pax Publishing House
Mao Zedong	O zadaniach artysty i pisarza (On the Tasks of the Artist and Writer)	1950	Czytelnik Publishing House, speeches from June 9 and May 23, 1942, co-translated with Wanda Jedlicka from English and French versions
Michel Pastoureau	Życie codzienne we Francji i Anglii w czasach rycerzy Okrągłego Stołu (XII–XIII wiek) (Daily Life in France and England in the Time of the Knights of the Round Table)	1983	State Publishing Institute PIW
George Bernard Shaw	Teatry londyńskie w latach dziewięćdziesiątych (London Theatres in the 1890s)	1967	Art and Film Publishing House, selection of reviews, co-translated with Zofia Sroczyńska
George Bernard Shaw	Aforyzmy (Aphorisms)	1975	State Publishing Institute PIW, one of the translations in an anthology
John Shearman	Manieryzm (Mannerism)	1970	State Publishing Institute PIW
Pierre Sichel	Modigliani	1971	Biography
Cornelia Otis Skinner	Madame Sarah	1981	State Publishing Institute PIW, biography
Ellen Terry	Historia mojego życia (The Story of My Life)	1989	State Publishing Institute PIW

== Awards and honors ==
- Medal of the 10th Anniversary of People's Poland (1954)
- Cross of Merit (1955)

== Bibliography ==
- "Cmentarz Wojskowy" [Military Cemetery]. www.cmentarzekomunalne.com.pl (in Polish).
- Derdziński, Ryszard (8 January 2009). "Ona przełożyła dla nas Śródziemie, cz. 2" [She translated Middle-earth for us, part 2]. Elendilion (in Polish).
- Gumkowski, Marek (2002). "Nota wydawcy" [Publisher's note]. In Tolkien, J. R. R. (ed.). Władca Pierścieni [Lord of the Rings] (in Polish). Vol. 1. Translated by Skibniewska, Maria. Warsaw: Muza SA. ISBN 83-7319-172-0.
- Sylwanowicz, Agnieszka; Leśniewski, Michał; Miklas, Sławomir, eds. (2023). "Historia polskich tłumaczeń dzieł Tolkiena: z Agnieszką Sylwanowicz i Michałem Leśniewskim rozmawia Sławomir Miklas „Bombadil"" [The History of Polish Translations of Tolkien's Works: An Interview with Agnieszka Sylwanowicz and Michał Leśniewski by Sławomir Miklas "Bombadil"]. Poznaj Tolkiena w Poznaniu. Tolkien Reading Day i konferencja naukowa 25–26 marca 2022 roku [Meet Tolkien in Poznań. Tolkien Reading Day and Academic Conference, March 25–26, 2022] (in Polish). Poznań: Uniwersytet im. Adama Mickiewicza w Poznaniu. ISBN 978-83-67372-92-3.
- Konarski, Stanisław (1997). "Skibniewski Stanisław Maria". Polski Słownik Biograficzny [Polish Biographical Dictionary] (in Polish). Vol. XXXVIII. Warsaw; Kraków: Polish Academy of Sciences. ISBN 978-83-86301-01-0.
- Lichański, Jakub Zdzisław (2003). Opowiadania o... krawędzi epok i czasów Johna Ronalda Reuela Tolkiena, czyli metafizyka, powieść, fantazja [Stories about... the edge of epochs and times of John Ronald Reuel Tolkien, that is metaphysics, novel, fantasy] (in Polish). Warsaw: DiG. ISBN 83-7181-278-7.
- Morawski, Marcin (2007). "Poland: Reception of Tolkien". In Drout, Michael (ed.). J.R.R. Tolkien Encyclopedia: Scholarship and Critical Assessment. New York; London: Routledge. ISBN 978-0-415-96942-0.
- Poradecki, Mateusz (2015). "Elfy i krasnoludy – adaptacje tolkienowskich ras" [Elves and Dwarves – adaptations of Tolkien's races]. Biblioteka Postscriptum Polonistycznego (in Polish). 5. ISSN 1898-1593.
- Skręt, Rościsław (1997). "Skibniewska ze Skibińskich Maria" [Maria Skibniewska, née Skibińska]. Polski Słownik Biograficzny [Polish Biographical Dictionary] (in Polish). Vol. XXXVIII. Warsaw; Kraków: Polish Academy of Sciences. ISBN 978-83-86301-01-0.
- Tolkien, J. R. R. (2010). Carpenter, Humphrey; Tolkien, Christopher (eds.). Listy [Letters] (in Polish). Translated by Sylwanowicz, Agnieszka. Poznań: Prószyński i S-ka. ISBN 978-83-7648-503-4.
- Umiński, Krzysztof (2022). Trzy tłumaczki [Three Translators] (in Polish). Warsaw: Marginesy. ISBN 978-83-67022-61-3.
- Zawadzka, Joanna (2001). "Skibniewska Maria". In Czachowska, Jadwiga; Szałagan, Alicja (eds.). Współcześni polscy pisarze i badacze literatury: Słownik biobibliograficzny [Contemporary Polish Writers and Literature Researchers: Biobibliographic Dictionary] (in Polish). Vol. 7. Warsaw: Wydawnictwa Szkolne i Pedagogiczne. ISBN 83-02-05444-5.
