= The Accounting =

Book by Bruce Marshall

- First edition (UK) with original title
- Author: Bruce Marshall
- Publisher: Constable
- Publication date: 1958
- Publication place: Scotland
- Media type: Print (hardback)
- Pages: 285
- Preceded by: Girl in May (1956)
- Followed by: A Thread of Scarlet (1959)

The Accounting is a 1958 novel by Scottish writer Bruce Marshall, published as The Bank Audit in the UK.

== Plot summary ==
The scene of this novel is Paris, where the branch of a well-known London bank is being audited. A normally routine affair, this year's audit is different—the auditors have reason to believe that there may be fraud or embezzlement at play. The auditors in the story suspect this after hearing a few words at a Paris nightclub.

The readers' attention is turned to each player, including the bank officials and overseers of the audit, but mostly to the unhappy junior and senior auditors, each a prisoner of his own private conflicts and aspirations, and each seeing the discovery and proving of the fraud as his chance for promotion.

The novel makes the task of auditing understandable and delves into the hearts of those who make business their life's work.
