= The Stooping Venus =

Book by Bruce Marshall

- Author: Bruce Marshall
- Language: English
- Genre: Novel
- Publisher: E. P. Dutton & Company
- Publication date: 1926
- Publication place: Scotland
- Media type: Print (hardback)
- Pages: 338
- Preceded by: This Sorry Scheme (1925)
- Followed by: Teacup Terrace (1926)

The Stooping Venus is a 1926 novel by Scottish writer Bruce Marshall.

== Plot summary ==
Lady Louise Eleanor Stromworth-Jenkins is "very much of the nineteen twenties." The daughter of an English Baron and a French mother, Louise is young, wealthy, intelligent, well-educated and beautiful. An object of pursuit by many eligible young men in her London, England area, Louise feels herself not really capable of love.

She meets Lord James Strathcrombie, a decorated war veteran and owner of Benhyter Motors, Limited, a successful automobile company. Eventually, despite her lack of deep love for James, they marry.

While Strathcrombie is in Paris on a business trip, Louise travels to Roscoff, France to visit her good friend Veronica Ashley, who is staying there with her family and several friends.

One of the friends is Robert Hewitt, a Scottish medical student and the author of one relatively unsuccessful novel. Although she believes in loyalty and is devoted to her husband, Louise feels an attraction to Robert which lasts through the visit. Soon all return to their respective endeavors.

A few months later Louise travels to St. Andrews, Scotland to visit friends. There she encounters Robert again, this time just after he has published his second novel, The Silver Fleece, which has become a great success.

Louise and Robert spend considerable time together and the encounters grow increasingly romantic. But again, nothing happens between them and soon they part.

In London, the Strathcrombies entertain the Merrill family in their home. The family has two young daughters, Babs and Mavis. While talking with Louise the young women express their admiration for The Silver Fleece. Louise mentions that she knows the author and using their enthusiasm as an excuse, invites Robert for a visit. After meeting him, Babs also finds herself very attracted to Robert.

During this visit, Louise and Robert discuss running off together. Louise still feels loyalty to James, but feels that this is her chance for love, a chance she did not believe was ever possible. Robert also expresses agreement with the idea, although he also feels an attraction to Babs.

They determine to tell James, but he leaves on an emergency business trip before Louise can work up the courage to do so. They attempt to follow him to Bordeaux, France, but en route, while staying in a hotel, Robert encounters Babs. Desperate, Babs kisses Robert just as Louise, looking for him in the hotel, walks in on them.

Realizing that Robert does not feel as deeply for her as she for him, she returns to James.

After all this, Veronica tells Louise about a statue that she has.

"A naked woman, stooping, groping for something, it seems. 'The Stooping Venus' I always call it. What she's stooping for I can never quite make out. A philosophy, perhaps, or even a garment. And I'm sure that it's something quite ordinary she wants to find: common sense if it’s a philosophy, a flannelette petticoat if it's a garment. That's you, Louise. Stooping to find—content, and motherhood, and lawful love."
