= The Early Stories: 1953–1975 =

2003 John Updike book

- First edition cover
- Author: John Updike
- Language: English
- Publisher: Knopf
- Publication date: October 21, 2003
- Publication place: United States
- Pages: 864
- ISBN: 978-1-4000-4072-8

The Early Stories: 1953–1975, published in 2003 by Knopf, is a John Updike book collecting much of his short stories written from the beginning of his writing career, when he was just 21, until 1975. Only four stories published in this entire time period have been omitted from this collection by John Updike himself: "Intercession" (collected in The Same Door), and "The Pro", "One of My Generation", and "God Speaks" (collected in Museums and Women and Other Stories). The majority of the stories were originally published in The New Yorker magazine. In 2004, the book received the PEN/Faulkner Award for Fiction.

== Stories collected ==
The stories are not arranged chronologically but rather by theme into eight sections: "Olinger Stories" (from "You'll Never Know, Dear, How Much I Love You" to "In Football Season", same as the 1964 collection Olinger Stories), "Out in the World" (from "The Lucid Eye in Silver Town" to "At a Bar in Charlotte Amalie"), "Married Life" (from "Toward Evening" to "Nakedness"), "Family Life" (from "The Family Meadow" to "Daughter, Last Glimpses of"), "The Two Iseults" (from "Solitaire" to " I Will Not Let Thee Go, Except Thou Bless Me"), "Tarbox Tales" (from "The Indian" to "Eclipse"), "Far Out" (from "Archangel" to "The Sea's Green Sameness"), and "The Single Life" (from "The Bulgarian Poetess" to "Love Song, for a Moog Synthesizer").

Title	Originally published	Originally collected
You'll Never Know, Dear, How Much I Love You	June 18, 1960 (The New Yorker)	Pigeon Feathers and Other Stories (1962)
The Alligators	March 22, 1958 (The New Yorker)	The Same Door (1959)
Pigeon Feathers	August 19, 1961 (The New Yorker)	Pigeon Feathers and Other Stories (1962)
Friends from Philadelphia	October 30, 1954 (The New Yorker)	The Same Door (1959)
A Sense of Shelter	January 16, 1960 (The New Yorker)	Pigeon Feathers and Other Stories (1962)
Flight	August 22, 1959 (The New Yorker)	Pigeon Feathers and Other Stories (1962)
The Happiest I've Been	January 3, 1959 (The New Yorker)	The Same Door (1959)
The Persistence of Desire	July 11, 1959 (The New Yorker)	Pigeon Feathers and Other Stories (1962)
The Blessed Man of Boston, My Grandmother's Thimble, and Fanning Island		Pigeon Feathers and Other Stories (1962)
Packed Dirt, Churchgoing, a Dying Cat, a Traded Car	December 16, 1961 (The New Yorker)	Pigeon Feathers and Other Stories (1962)
In Football Season	November 10, 1962 (The New Yorker)	The Music School (1966)
The Lucid Eye in Silver Town		
The Kid's Whistling	December 3, 1955 (The New Yorker)	The Same Door (1959)
Ace in the Hole	April 9, 1955 (The New Yorker)	The Same Door (1959)
Tomorrow and Tomorrow and So Forth	April 30, 1955 (The New Yorker)	The Same Door (1959)
The Christian Roommates	April 4, 1964 (The New Yorker)	The Music School (1966)
Dentistry and Doubt	October 29, 1955 (The New Yorker)	The Same Door (1959)
A Madman	December 22, 1962 (The New Yorker)	The Music School (1966)
Still Life	January 24, 1959 (The New Yorker)	Pigeon Feathers and Other Stories (1962)
Home	July 9, 1960 (The New Yorker)	Pigeon Feathers and Other Stories (1962)
Who Made Yellow Roses Yellow?	April 7, 1956 (The New Yorker)	The Same Door (1959)
His Finest Hour	June 23, 1956 (The New Yorker)	The Same Door (1959)
A Trillion Feet of Gas	December 8, 1956 (The New Yorker)	The Same Door (1959)
Dear Alexandros	October 31, 1959 (The New Yorker)	Pigeon Feathers and Other Stories (1962)
The Doctor's Wife	February 11, 1961 (The New Yorker)	Pigeon Feathers and Other Stories (1962)
At a Bar in Charlotte Amalie	January 11, 1964 (The New Yorker)	The Music School (1966)
Toward Evening	February 11, 1956 (The New Yorker)	The Same Door (1959)
Snowing in Greenwich Village ^{1}	January 21, 1956 (The New Yorker)	The Same Door (1959)
Sunday Teasing	October 13, 1956 (The New Yorker)	The Same Door (1959)
Incest	June 29, 1957 (The New Yorker)	The Same Door (1959)
A Gift from the City	April 12, 1958 (The New Yorker)	The Same Door (1959)
Walter Briggs		Pigeon Feathers and Other Stories (1962)
The Crow in the Woods		Pigeon Feathers and Other Stories (1962)
Should Wizard Hit Mommy?	June 13, 1959 (The New Yorker)	Pigeon Feathers and Other Stories (1962)
Wife-Wooing ^{1}	March 12, 1960 (The New Yorker)	Pigeon Feathers and Other Stories (1962)
Unstuck	February 3, 1962 (The New Yorker)	Trust Me (1984)
Giving Blood ^{1}	April 6, 1963 (The New Yorker)	The Music School (1966)
Twin Beds in Rome ^{1}	February 8, 1964 (The New Yorker)	The Music School (1966)
Marching through Boston ^{1}	January 22, 1966 (The New Yorker)	Museums and Women and Other Stories (1972)
Nakedness ^{1}		
The Family Meadow	July 24, 1965 (The New Yorker)	The Music School (1966)
The Day of the Dying Rabbit	August 30, 1969 (The New Yorker)	Museums and Women and Other Stories (1972)
How to Love America and Leave It at the Same Time	August 19, 1972 (The New Yorker)	Problems and Other Stories (1979)
The Music School	December 12, 1964 (The New Yorker)	The Music School (1966)
Man and Daughter in the Cold	March 9, 1968 (The New Yorker)	Museums and Women and Other Stories (1972)
The Rescue	January 2, 1965 (The New Yorker)	The Music School (1966)
Plumbing ^{1}	February 20, 1971 (The New Yorker)	Museums and Women and Other Stories (1972)
The Orphaned Swimming Pool	June 27, 1970 (The New Yorker)	Museums and Women and Other Stories (1972)
When Everyone Was Pregnant		Museums and Women and Other Stories (1972)
Eros Rampant ^{1}	June 1968 (Harper's)	Museums and Women and Other Stories (1972)
Sublimating ^{1}		Museums and Women and Other Stories (1972)
Nevada	January 1974 (Playboy)	Problems and Other Stories (1979)
The Gun Shop	November 25, 1972 (The New Yorker)	Problems and Other Stories (1979)
Son	April 21, 1973 (The New Yorker)	Problems and Other Stories (1979)
Daughter, Last Glimpses of	November 5, 1973 (The New Yorker)	Problems and Other Stories (1979)
Solitaire	January 22, 1972 (The New Yorker)	Museums and Women and Other Stories (1972)
Leaves	November 14, 1964 (The New Yorker)	The Music School (1966)
The Stare	April 3, 1965 (The New Yorker)	The Music School (1966)
Museums and Women	November 18, 1967 (The New Yorker)	Museums and Women and Other Stories (1972)
Avec la Bébé-Sitter	January 1, 1966 (The New Yorker)	The Music School (1966)
Four Sides of One Story	October 9, 1965 (The New Yorker)	The Music School (1966)
The Morning	July 18, 1964 (The New Yorker)	The Music School (1966)
My Lover Has Dirty Fingernails	July 17, 1965 (The New Yorker)	The Music School (1966)
Harv is Plowing Now	April 23, 1966 (The New Yorker)	The Music School (1966)
I Will Not Let Thee Go, Except Thou Bless Me	October 11, 1969 (The New Yorker)	Museums and Women and Other Stories (1972)
The Indian	August 17, 1963 (The New Yorker)	The Music School (1966)
The Hillies	December 20, 1969 (The New Yorker)	Museums and Women and Other Stories (1972)
The Tarbox Police		
The Corner	May 24, 1969 (The New Yorker)	Museums and Women and Other Stories (1972)
A & P	July 22, 1961 (The New Yorker)	Pigeon Feathers and Other Stories (1962)
Lifeguard	June 16, 1961 (The New Yorker)	Pigeon Feathers and Other Stories (1962)
The Deacon	February 21, 1970 (The New Yorker)	Museums and Women and Other Stories (1972)
The Carol Sing	December 19, 1970 (The New Yorker)	Museums and Women and Other Stories (1972)
The Taste of Metal ^{1}	March 11, 1967 (The New Yorker)	Museums and Women and Other Stories (1972)
Your Lover Just Called ^{1}		Museums and Women and Other Stories (1972)
Commercial	June 10, 1972 (The New Yorker)	Problems and Other Stories (1979)
Minutes of the Last Meeting	July–August 1972 (Audience)	Problems and Other Stories (1979)
Believers	July 1972 (Harper's Monthly)	Problems and Other Stories (1979)
Eclipse		
Archangel		Pigeon Feathers and Other Stories (1962)
The Dark	October 31, 1964 (The New Yorker)	The Music School (1966)
The Astronomer	April 1, 1961 (The New Yorker)	Pigeon Feathers and Other Stories (1962)
The Witnesses	August 13, 1966 (The New Yorker)	Museums and Women and Other Stories (1972)
A Constellation of Events		Trust Me (1984)
Ethiopia	January 14, 1974 (The New Yorker)	Problems and Other Stories (1979)
Transaction	March 1974 (Oui)	Problems and Other Stories (1979)
Augustine's Concubine	April 1975 (The Atlantic)	Problems and Other Stories (1979)
During the Jurassic		Museums and Women and Other Stories (1972)
Under the Microscope		Museums and Women and Other Stories (1972)
The Baluchitherium		Museums and Women and Other Stories (1972)
The Invention of the Horse Collar	Spring-Summer 1971 (The Transatlantic Review)	Museums and Women and Other Stories (1972)
Jesus on Honshu	December 25, 1971 (The New Yorker)	Museums and Women and Other Stories (1972)
The Slump		Museums and Women and Other Stories (1972)
The Sea's Green Sameness		Museums and Women and Other Stories (1972)
The Bulgarian Poetess	March 13, 1965 (The New Yorker)	The Music School (1966)
The Hermit	February 20, 1965 (The New Yorker)	The Music School (1966)
I Am Dying, Egypt, Dying		Museums and Women and Other Stories (1972)
Separating ^{1}	June 23, 1975 (The New Yorker)	Problems and Other Stories (1979)
Gesturing ^{1}		
Killing		Trust Me (1984)
Problems	November 3, 1975 (The New Yorker)	Problems and Other Stories (1979)
The Man Who Loved Extinct Mammals	July 21, 1975 (The New Yorker)	Problems and Other Stories (1979)
Love Song, for a Moog Synthesizer ^{2}	June 14, 1976 (The New Yorker)	Problems and Other Stories (1979)

== Notes ==
1. Stories later collected in Too Far to Go (1979), which was later reprinted in 2009 as The Maples Stories.
2. Despite being published in 1976, this story was written a year earlier.
