= Prayer for the Living =

Book by Bruce Marshall

- Author: Bruce Marshall
- Language: English
- Publication date: 1934
- Publication place: Scotland
- Media type: Print (Hardback)
- Preceded by: Father Malachy's Miracle (1931)
- Followed by: The Uncertain Glory (1935)

Prayer for the Living is a 1934 novel by Scottish writer Bruce Marshall.

== Plot summary ==
A witty, engrossing, unique novel about the life of masters and boys in a Scottish prep school. One way of describing this novel is to say that it is a story of life in a prep school in Scotland during World War I: and that, so far as the bare facts go, is an accurate description. But it is no way at all of conveying to the reader the devilish wit and cutting satire with which Mr. Marshall heightens and brightens the scene, or the pathos surrounding schoolboys who will overnight be turned into soldiers, or the moving idyl of love between the headmaster's daughter and a young student about to leave for the Front.
