= The Fair Bride =

Book by Bruce Marshall

- First edition (UK)
- Author: Bruce Marshall
- Cover artist: Paxton Chadwick
- Language: English
- Publisher: Constable (UK); Houghton Mifflin (US)
- Publication date: 1953
- Publication place: United Kingdom (Scotland)
- Media type: Print (Hardback)
- Pages: 274
- Preceded by: To Every Man a Penny (1949)
- Followed by: Only Fade Away (1954)

The Fair Bride is a 1953 novel by Scottish writer Bruce Marshall.

== Plot summary ==
A young priest decides to leave the church because disillusioned by the worldliness and minor cruelty of the clergy. This decision coincides with the outbreak of the Spanish Civil War. The rebels accuse priests of indoctrinating their followers against them, and many get beaten up and tortured. The priest discovers that the clergy he had despised are capable of heroism under terrible torture. He interprets this as holiness, and this prompts him to rejoin the church, in a state of great fear and personal confusion. This means that he, himself, has to go on the run. He goes into a cabaret to hide and meets a young girl, an entertainer in the club and an illiterate prostitute. She and her mother shelter him. They become lovers while he thinks of himself as an atheist. Later, when he reconverts to Christianity, he preaches purity to her. Both of them wind up being arrested, and she gets shot protecting him. As she dies in his arms, he suddenly recognises that this little prostitute has shown him a depth of pure love and acceptance that puts him, the intellectual, professional clergyman, to deep shame.

Meanwhile, both sides are searching for a sacred relic that is believed to have miraculous powers - it is said to have helped defeat Napoleon. Because the ordinary people believe that the side that has the relic is going to win, both sides obviously want to have it. The relic ends up in the priest's possession, and he recognises its power as a morale-booster so doesn't want it to fall into the wrong hands.

We watch this priest growing up and learning about the subtle depths of human motivation.

== Analysis ==
The Spanish Republicans have been lionized for decades for their struggle against Francisco Franco’s pre-war alliance with fascism. The novel reveals an under-publicized truth - that the Spanish Republicans singled out religious targets and many harmless middle class targets and killed or persecuted them. It depicts the Republicans running areas under their control along Stalinist lines.

== Adaptation ==
The novel was the basis of the 1960 film The Angel Wore Red starring Ava Gardner, Dirk Bogarde, Joseph Cotten and Vittorio De Sica, which was the last film directed by Nunnally Johnson.
