= And There Were Giants =

Book by Bruce Marshall

- Author: Bruce Marshall
- Language: English
- Genre: Fiction
- Publication date: 1927
- Publication place: United Kingdom

And There Were Giants is a 1927 novel by Scottish writer Bruce Marshall. The novel is about a Scottish priest who marries a prostitute in an attempt to make her leave the profession.

== Plot ==
The novel examines religious extremism in the context of modern life through the fictional life of John Glenuff, the very sincere only son of a Scots millionaire. He disappoints his parents by choosing a life as an Anglican priest. Though not required by his religion, he decides to live celibately and turns away the interest of a young, wealthy woman who throws herself at him. However, when a prostitute named Dorothy Spain approaches him in public he decides to marry her to get her out of a life on the streets. His unconventional decision results in them being transferred to a parish in Paris. The priest's devotion to his religious calling drives him to preach in nightspots. His religious zeal tires the members of his new parish and they show increasing indifference to him and his services. He works harder to convince everyone, including his superiors, and the stress of this brings religious delusions upon him. Though she is grateful to him, a celibate lifestyle is not at all what his wife wants and she leaves him for another man. He finds himself with that man's wife. He suffers a faith crisis and throws over his religious scruples to move in with this woman, who embodies the carefree worldliness of Paris.

== Reception ==
Upon publication it was described as "not a book to read lightly; requires serious contemplation," though the same reviewer found the main character too silly to merit interest. Another reviewer thought much more highly of the book. The East Anglian Daily Times felt it deserved notice because of its sincerity. The reviewer at The Western Mail found it cynical. The Australasian said it was interesting but not enjoyable to read. The Mercury's reviewer felt the book was cynical in its inability to bridge the gap between John's rigid ideals and the moral laxity of Paris. The reviewer at The Age felt it wasn't for young or unprepared readers but that, for the right readers, it would be memorable.
