= Thoughts of My Cats =

Book by Bruce Marshall

- First edition (UK)
- Author: Bruce Marshall
- Language: English
- Publisher: Constable & Co. (UK); Houghton Mifflin (US)
- Publication date: 1954
- Publication place: Scotland
- Media type: Print (Hardback)
- Pages: 104

Thoughts of My Cats is a 1954 non-fiction book by Scottish writer Bruce Marshall.

== Synopsis ==
It is the story of the cats who adopted the Marshalls' villa at Cap d'Antibes when their less loving owners departed at the end of the season minus their pets.

The book is contains photographs of the author and his felines, and is a witty treatise on how to influence cats.
