= A Foot in the Grave =

Book by Bruce Marshall

- First edition
- Author: Bruce Marshall
- Language: English
- Published: 1987 Robert Hale
- Publication place: Scotland
- Media type: Print (Paperback)
- Pages: 175
- ISBN: 0-7090-3021-5
- OCLC: 59693577

A Foot in the Grave is a 1987 novel by Scottish writer Bruce Marshall.

== Plot summary ==
When John Smith's garrulous South American wife was found dead in Buenos Aires, he is accused by the Argentine police not only of her murder, but also of tax evasion, links with the British Intelligence Service and of conspiring to overthrow the Argentine dictatorship.
