= Brigitte Friang =

French journalist and writer (1924–2011)

- Born: 23 January 1924; Paris, French
- Died: 6 March 2011 (aged 87)
- Occupations: Journalist; writer

Brigitte Friang (23 January 1924 – 6 March 2011) was a French journalist, writer and French Resistance member.

== Biography ==
Friang was born in Paris in 1924 and immediately after leaving school in Paris in 1943 joined the French Resistance. Working in the same group as Colonel F. F. E. Yeo-Thomas, she was captured by the Gestapo, shot while trying to escape, then taken to Fresnes Prison and tortured, before being deported to Ravensbrück concentration camp.

After the war, Friang was liberated and returned to Paris where she worked for four years as a press aide to André Malraux, before becoming a journalist. In 1953, she was sent to French Indochina as a war correspondent. There she undertook parachute training and was dropped, in the opening hours of Operation Castor, into Điện Biên Province, in the north-west corner of Vietnam. She made several combat jumps including one with Lt Col Bigeard's 6th Colonial Paratroop Battalion at Tu-Le after which she accompanied the 6th on their retreat to French lines. She survived the war and returned to Paris where she worked as a writer and journalist until her retirement.

On 6 June 1954, she appeared as a challenger on the TV panel show What's My Line? (the mystery guests for that episode were George Burns and Gracie Allen).

Friang died 6 March 2011 at the age of 87.

== Honors and awards ==
- Resistance medal
- Grand Officier of the Order of the Legion of Honour
- Grand Officier of the Ordre National du Mérite

== Published works ==
- Parachutes and Petticoats. Translated by Cadel, James. London: Jarrolds. 1958. ASIN B0006DCEQY. B0000CK0Z8.
- Les Fleurs du ciel [The Flowers of Heaven] (in French). Paris: Robert Laffont. 1955. ISBN 978-2-221-02334-1.
- La Mousson de la liberté. Vietnam, du colonialisme au stalinisme [The Storm of freedom. Vietnam, from colonialism to Stalinism] (in French). Paris: Plon. 1976. ISBN 978-2259001663.
- Un Autre Malraux [Another Malraux] (in French). Paris: Plon. 1977. ISBN 978-2-259-00274-5.
- Regarde-toi qui meurs 1943–1945 [Look at You Who Die 1943–1945] (in French) (2 Vols ed.). Paris: France Loisirs. 1978. ISBN 9782724203820.
- Petit tour autour de Malraux [Little Bit About Malraux] (in French). Paris: Félin. 2001. ISBN 978-2-86645-413-5.

== Notes and sources ==
- Fall, Barnard (2005). Street Without Joy. Barnsley: Pen & Sword Military. ISBN 978-1-84415-318-3.
- Simpson, Howard R. (1994). Dien Bien Phu: The Epic Battle America Forgot. London: Brassey's. ISBN 978-1-57488-024-3.
- Windrow, Martin (2004). The Last Valley. Weidenfeld and Nicolson. ISBN 0-306-81386-6.
