= The Angel Wore Red =

1960 film

- Theatrical release poster
- Directed by: Nunnally Johnson
- Screenplay by: Nunnally Johnson
- Based on: The Fair Bride; 1953 novel by Bruce Marshall
- Produced by: Goffredo Lombardo
- Starring: Ava Gardner; Dirk Bogarde; Joseph Cotten; Vittorio De Sica; Aldo Fabrizi; Enrico Maria Salerno
- Cinematography: Giuseppe Rotunno
- Edited by: Louis R. Loeffler
- Music by: Bronislau Kaper; Angelo Francesco Lavagnino
- Production companies: Metro-Goldwyn-Mayer; Titanus
- Distributed by: Metro-Goldwyn-Mayer (United States); Titanus (Italy)
- Release date: September 28, 1960
- Running time: Italy: 95 min USA: 99 min
- Countries: United States; Italy
- Languages: English; Italian
- Budget: $1,843,000
- Box office: $935,000

The Angel Wore Red, also known as La sposa bella in its Italian version, is a 1960 Italian-American MGM/Titanus coproduction war drama starring Ava Gardner and Dirk Bogarde. It was directed by Nunnally Johnson and produced by Goffredo Lombardo from a screenplay by Johnson based on the 1953 novel The Fair Bride by Bruce Marshall.

Giorgio Prosperi wrote the dialogue for the Italian version. The music score for the American version was written by Bronislau Kaper and by Angelo Francesco Lavagnino for the Italian version. The cinematography was handled by Giuseppe Rotunno.

== Plot ==
Young Catholic priest Arturo Carrera sympathizes with the poor in the Spanish Civil War but finds that his fellow priests have little concern for the poor because they support the Nationalist rebels. He resigns from the priesthood. Hours later, the city is bombarded and he takes shelter with a mysterious, beautiful woman named Soledad.

As night falls, Loyalist speakers induce a mob to torch the church, and its ranking cleric moves to hide the Blood of St. John relic by giving his deputy the task of taking it to Franco's Nationalists. Both the deputy and Arturo become hunted men. Arturo seeks shelter in a local cabaret, where he again meets Soledad, who is revealed to be a prostitute.

Soledad discovers that Arturo was a priest, but because she likes him, she tries unsuccessfully to hide him from the militiamen. Hawthorne, New York war correspondent and Soledad's friend, tries to free Arturo.

Arturo tells the Loyalist intelligence chief that he can make himself useful by comforting Catholic Loyalists who are wavering because of the treatment of the church.

Out of jail, but under surveillance, Arturo meets Soledad and the priest who has hidden the holy relic. The absence of the relic is causing unrest in the town and unsettling the local Loyalist militia. The Loyalists are now suffering a great number of desertions because of the missing relic, which is fabled to provide victory to those who possess it. This makes it essential for the local Loyalists to secure it. But because of a well-meaning, disastrous attempt to feed the old priest in hiding, Soledad leads Loyalist security men to his hideout.

Despite torture, the old priest refuses to divulge the relic's location, and he is to be shot at dawn. The security chief then has Arturo hear the condemned priest's confession. Learning of the relic's whereabouts, Arturo takes it, but claims not to know where it is. He is arrested and taken to see the torturing of Soledad, for whom he has declared his love.

Soledad is spared by the arrival of the commanding general, an old man who disapproves of torture and dirty tricks. He orders all 250 prisoners to be marched to the battle lines. They will be given arms to slow the Nationalist advance on the city and cover the Loyalists' retreat. On the march, Arturo gives Soledad the relic so she that can try to take it to safety. However, in a surprise nighttime rebel attack, she is wounded. The prisoners change hands, but the Nationalist commander decides that he cannot trust them or leave them behind, and he orders that they be executed. Arturo pleads with the officer assigned to the task, but the man does not believe Arturo's story. Before the unfortunates have been shot, however, Soledad and the relic are found. She dies, but the prisoners are set free.

== Cast ==
- Ava Gardner as Soledad
- Dirk Bogarde as Arturo Carrera
- Joseph Cotten as Hawthorne
- Vittorio De Sica as Republican General Clave
- Aldo Fabrizi as Canon Rota
- Arnoldo Foà as Insurgent major
- Finlay Currie as Bishop
- Rossana Rory as Mercedes
- Enrico Maria Salerno as Captain Botargus
- Robert Bright as Father Idlefonso
- Franco Castellani as Jose
- Bob Cunningham as Mac
- Gustavo De Nardo as Major Garcia
- Nino Castelnuovo as Captain Trinidad
- Aldo Pini as Chaplain

== Reception ==
In a contemporary review for The New York Times, critic Eugene Archer wrote: "Conventional though the story sounds, the unusual subject matter provides some intriguing scenes. ... No amount of thoughtful writing or glib direction, however, can salvage the effort when the plot, after going farther than other films toward investigating a religious quandary in the Graham Greene manner, takes everything back at the end and dissolves into a mass of inspirational sentimentality."

According to MGM records, the film earned $410,000 in the U.S. and Canada and $525,000 in other markets, resulting in a loss of $1,527,000, making it one of MGM's bigger box-office failures of the year.
