= To Every Man a Penny =

Book by Bruce Marshall

- First edition (US)
- Author: Bruce Marshall
- Language: English
- Publisher: Houghton Mifflin (US); Constable (UK)
- Publication date: 1949
- Publication place: Scotland
- Media type: Print (Hardback)
- Preceded by: Vespers in Vienna (1947)
- Followed by: The Fair Bride (1953)

To Every Man a Penny is a 1949 novel by Scottish writer Bruce Marshall. Two major characters in the novel, Gaston and Bessier, like the author himself, had legs amputated due to wounds suffered in World War I.

== Plot summary ==
The story of a young French priest, Gaston, who goes off to World War I. In the trenches he is mutilated, modestly administers the sacraments, hears the confessions of dying men, aids the wounded, and becomes a good friend of a Communist, Louis Philippe Bessier.

Both he and Bessier are wounded in the leg, which is amputated, and both limp through the rest of the book. When they return to Paris, no one is expecting them – neither the canons of Father Gaston’s parish nor Bessier’s employers.

Gaston, who had always sustained himself with the idea that the great evil of the war could lead to good, is forced to change his mind. The world is moving away from the Church and the Church from the world.

The little girl Armelle, his pupil in catechism class, of whom he is very fond and who had always written to him in the trenches, wants to become a model, and he gives her his permission, even if many of his fellow canons disapprove.

Marshall masterfully recounts the Catholic Church in France between the two world wars. The more formal people are in approaching her, the more the ecclesiastical hierarchies appear closed in their moralisms, their formalisms, their solipsistic way of thinking.

In the end, the Bishop sends Gaston to South America for a couple of years. When he returns, much has changed: Armelle’s mother has died and she has become a prostitute. Bessier is working for the French Communist Party. The canons of his parish barely tolerate him.

During his absence, friars and priests have been forbidden to go to the barber because of some magazines there (considered risqué by the ecclesiastic authority). He doesn’t know this and goes to get his hair cut. Surprised by a fellow priest, the not very well-loved Fr Moune, he has a noisy argument with him in the street, attracting a small crowd. This time, too, he is punished by the Bishop.

In the meantime, the World War II is drawing near: Benito Mussolini and Adolf Hitler have burst onto the European scene. Gaston receives another fierce blow, which is that his beloved Armelle dies giving birth to a baby girl, Michelle. But there is a place where our priest can take refuge: the convent of some nuns who appreciate his simplicity and faith. Michelle will grow up there, among countless economic hardships and countless little economies.

During the German occupation, Gaston helps an English soldier, while the canons of the parish are hanging Marshal Philippe Pétain’s portrait on the walls. But at the moment of liberation, when everyone is on the side of the Resistance, our priest this time feels obligated to help a German soldier escape with his Jewish fiancée, whom he himself had earlier hidden from the Nazis.

The three are caught on the way by men of the Communist Party who beat them and kill the two young people. Gaston is saved at the last minute by his friend Bessier, who miraculously appears and gets him out of prison. Gaston’s eyes never heal completely from this brutal beating.

In the end, mysteriously, the destinies of the characters fall into place: Bessier’s son, who has in the meantime become a “heretic” within the Communist Party, marries the lovely Michelle, and finally Gaston becomes resident chaplain at the convent of the nuns.
