= An Account of Capers =

Book by Bruce Marshall

- First UK edition
- Author: Bruce Marshall
- Language: English
- Publisher: Robert Hale (UK); Houghton Mifflin (US)
- Publication date: 1988
- Publication place: Scotland
- Media type: Print (Hardback)
- Pages: 160
- ISBN: 0709031076
- OCLC: 17776688

An Account of Capers is a novel by Scottish writer Bruce Marshall. His last book, it was published posthumously in 1988.

== Plot summary ==
Set against the background of an Italy poised on the brink of war with Abyssinia in 1935, the story focuses on chartered accountant Arthur Waters. He is sent to Milan to audit the books of an Italian firm. His job, which at first glance seems simple, is complicated by his involvement with Emma, a stunning woman, and Bazzini, a cunning man. But his problems really begin when he is mistaken for a British spy and prevented from leaving the country.
