= The Month of the Falling Leaves =

1963 novel by Bruce Marshall

- First UK edition
- Author: Bruce Marshall
- Publisher: Constable (UK); Doubleday (US)
- Publication date: 1963
- Publication place: Scotland
- Media type: Print (hardback)

The Month of the Falling Leaves is a 1963 novel by Scottish writer Bruce Marshall.

== Plot summary ==
A philosophy professor is mistaken for a spy.

== Adaptions ==
This novel was the basis of the 1968 German TV film Der Monat der fallenden Blätter. Marshall co-wrote the screenplay with Herbert Asmodi. It was directed by Dietrich Haugk.
