= A Girl from Lübeck =

Book by Bruce Marshall

- First edition (UK)
- Author: Bruce Marshall
- Published: Collins (UK) 1962; Houghton Mifflin (US) 1962
- Publication place: United Kingdom (Scotland)
- Media type: Print (hardback)
- Pages: 216

A Girl from Lübeck is a 1962 novel by Scottish writer Bruce Marshall. It is a satiric parable with themes of romance, suspense, and intrigue, while exploring the meaning of faith and grace.

== Plot summary ==
Versory is a literary lecturer who spreads English culture ("from Beowulf to Dylan Thomas") throughout Germany. He catches a ride after delivering a talk to a group of matrons. Versory is surprised that his driver is a young woman, Hannelore. He becomes infatuated with her blonde hair and charming personality. They arrange to meet again in Paris and attend a meeting of literary lecturers from other countries.

In Paris, Versory becomes suspicious about how Hannelore can afford her expensive clothing and lifestyle. Following their meeting, Hannelore mentions that there is no way to contact her, but she will reach out to him. She maintains regular contact and expresses her affection. Despite this, Versory remains suspicious and wonders what Hannelore might be concealing. His role as a lecturer is a facade for other activities, and he has connections with a gentleman from South America. After Hannelore is discovered at Mr. Putiphar's establishment, Versory's superior, he takes her away in his sports car. The narrative leaves ambiguity about whether Hannelore loves Versory or is using him, with the ending revealing the truth about Hannelore.
