= The White Rabbit (book) =

Book by Bruce Marshall

- First US edition
- Author: Bruce Marshall
- Genre: Biography
- Publisher: Evans Brothers (UK); Houghton Mifflin (US)
- Publication date: 1952
- Publication place: England
- Media type: Print (hardback)
- Pages: ix, 262

The White Rabbit
- Photograph of Yeo-Thomas taken eight hours before he parachuted into occupied France in September 1943

The White Rabbit is a 1952 non-fiction book by Scottish writer Bruce Marshall. Its title comes from a nickname of F. F. E. Yeo-Thomas.

== Synopsis ==
F. F. E. Yeo-Thomas was the British Special Operations Executive (SOE) agent, called by the Germans "The White Rabbit" of World War II. He was given responsibilities by the British government in occupied Vichy France because he had lived in France during the interwar years and was fluent in French.

An assignment required Yeo-Thomas to be parachuted into France. Shortly after his arrival he was betrayed and captured by the Gestapo at the Passy metro station in Paris.

The Gestapo took him to their headquarters in the Avenue Foch, and he was subjected to brutal torture, including beatings, electrical shocks to the genitals, psychological gameplaying, sleep deprivation, and repeated submersion in ice-cold water—to the point that artificial respiration was sometimes required.

After the interrogations and torture, he was moved to Fresnes prison. After he made two failed attempts to escape he was transferred first to Compiègne prison and then to Buchenwald concentration camp. Within these various detention camps he attempted to organise resistance.

Late in the war, he briefly escaped from Buchenwald and, on his recapture, was able to pass himself off as a French national and sent to Marienburg, Stalag XX-B, a "better" camp, where the Nazis sent enlisted Frenchmen, instead of back to Buchenwald. It is reasonable to conclude that his chances of surviving the remainder of the war at Buchenwald were low.

After the war he resumed his life in France.

== Notable people mentioned in the book ==
- Phil Lamason
- Christopher Burney
- Harry Peulevé
- Stéphane Hessel
- Alfred Balachowsky
- Hermann Pister
- Karl-Otto Koch
- Ilse Koch
- Pierre Brossolette
- Eugen Kogon
- Erwin Ding-Schuler
- Jean Moulin
- Arthur Steele

== Adaptations ==
The book was adapted for Australian radio in 1955 by Morris West.

It was also adapted for British television in 1967.
