= Father Hilary's Holiday =

1965 book by Bruce Marshall

- First edition (UK)
- Author: Bruce Marshall
- Publisher: Constable (UK); Doubleday (US)
- Publication date: 1965
- Publication place: Scotland
- Media type: Print (hardback)
- Pages: 179

Father Hilary's Holiday is a 1965 novel by Scottish writer Bruce Marshall.

== Plot summary ==
After thirty years in the priesthood, Father Hilary seizes the opportunity to attend a religious congress in South America. Father Hilary's well earned holiday is to be spent at a sort of ecumenical conference convened by "el Libertator" the Generalissimo of Tomasia. The result is a witty, pointed tale of humble but outspoken Franciscan friar and his wondrous escapades in the boiling maelstrom of a mythical Latin American dictatorship.
