= Girl in May =

Book by Bruce Marshall

- First US edition
- Author: Bruce Marshall
- Language: English
- Publisher: Constable & Co. (UK); Houghton Mifflin (US)
- Publication date: 1956
- Publication place: Scotland
- Media type: Print (Hardback)

Girl in May is a 1956 novel by Scottish writer Bruce Marshall.

== Plot summary ==
A romance set among a motley crowd of eccentrics of all ages who constitute the population of St. Andrews.
