= Dietrich Haugk =

German film director and voice actor (1925–2015)

Dietrich Haugk (12 May 1925 – 28 June 2015) was a German film director and voice actor. He was born in Ellrich/Harz, Germany. He made his stage debut at a theater in Bielefeld in 1946 and has been a noted theater director since 1949 and served as the German dubbing voice of Vittorio Gassman, Dirk Bogarde, Montgomery Clift and Jean-Louis Trintignant.

Married four times to actresses, he has three children, a son from his first and a son and a daughter from his fourth marriage. He died in Berlin. He was married four times and had three children.

== Selected filmography ==
- Heldinnen (1960) — (based on Minna von Barnhelm)
- Agatha, Stop That Murdering! (1960)
- Don't Tell Me Any Stories (1964)
- Der Richter von London (1966, TV film) — (based on The Shoemaker's Holiday by Thomas Dekker)
- Adrian der Tulpendieb (1966, TV miniseries) — (based on a novel by Otto Rombach)
- Der Trinker (1967, TV film) — (based on The Drinker by Hans Fallada)
- Der Monat der fallenden Blätter (1968, TV film) — (based on The Month of the Falling Leaves by Bruce Marshall)
- Der Kommissar (1969–1976, TV series, 8 episodes)
- Wienerinnen (1974, TV film) — (based on a play by Hermann Bahr)
- Derrick (1974–1998, TV series, 14 episodes)
- The Concert (1975, TV film) — (based on the play The Concert by Hermann Bahr)
- The Old Fox (1977–1998, TV series, 19 episodes)
- Tatort: Der King (1979, TV series episode)
- Sonderdezernat K1 (1982, TV series, 2 episodes)
- Die goldenen Schuhe (1983, TV miniseries) — (based on a play by Vicki Baum)
- Die Fräulein von damals (1986, TV film) — (screenplay by Robert Muller)
- Tatort: Tod auf Eis (1986, TV series episode)
- Praxis Bülowbogen (1987–1991, TV series, 16 episodes)
- Die Männer vom K3 (1988–1996, TV series, 5 episodes)
- Radiofieber (1989, TV miniseries) — (screenplay by Peter Märthesheimer and Pea Fröhlich)
- Rothenbaumchaussee (1991, TV film) — (screenplay by Robert Muller)
- Die Elefantenbraut (1994, TV film) — (screenplay by Manfred Purzer)
- Großstadtrevier (1995–1997, TV series, 10 episodes)
- Lebenslügen (2000, TV film)
