= Luckypenny =

Book by Bruce Marshall

- First edition
- Author: Bruce Marshall
- Publisher: E. P. Dutton
- Publication date: 1937
- Publication place: Scotland
- Media type: Print (hardback)
- Pages: 448

Luckypenny is a 1937 novel by Scottish writer Bruce Marshall.

== Plot summary ==
Luckypenny, the title character, is married with two young adult children. Like the author himself, Luckypenny has lost a leg in World War I. He works as an accountant with an English arms firm. Discovering some financial irregularities he blackmails his way to promotion.

He is sent to negotiate an arms sale to fascist Italy and becomes embroiled in a scheme to smuggle cash out of the country, arranged by his boss to get rid of him. He is caught, but escapes with the aid of a young woman, who, unbeknownst to Luckypenny, is an Italian espionage agent.

The agent falls in love with Luckypenny and helps him to land a large contract for his company.

Additional adventures involve Luckypenny's children. His son, Tom, and the boss's daughter fall in love, but Tom is shattered when he discovers that she is not a virgin. Luckypenny's daughter and his boss also begin a love affair.

The novel ends in Francoist Spain, where Luckypenny's fate depends upon the intervention of his Italian lover.
