= The Red Danube =

1949 film

- Film poster
- Directed by: George Sidney
- Screenplay by: Gina Kaus; Arthur Wimperis
- Based on: Vespers in Vienna; 1947 novel by Bruce Marshall
- Produced by: Carey Wilson
- Starring: Walter Pidgeon; Ethel Barrymore; Peter Lawford; Angela Lansbury; Janet Leigh
- Cinematography: Charles Rosher
- Edited by: James E. Newcom
- Music by: Miklós Rózsa
- Production company: Metro-Goldwyn-Mayer
- Distributed by: Loew's, Inc.
- Release date: October 14, 1949
- Running time: 119 minutes
- Country: United States
- Language: English
- Budget: $1.96 million
- Box office: $1.86 million

The Red Danube is a 1949 American drama film directed by George Sidney and starring Walter Pidgeon, Ethel Barrymore, Peter Lawford, Angela Lansbury, and Janet Leigh. The film uses the repatriation of Soviet citizens after World War II as a backdrop and was based on the 1947 novel Vespers in Vienna by Bruce Marshall.

== Plot ==
In Rome shortly after World War II, British Col. Michael "Hooky" Nicobar is expecting a transfer home when he is instead posted to Vienna with his aides Major John "Twingo" McPhimister, Junior Commander Audrey Quail, and Private David Moonlight. Hooky, who lost an arm in World War I, is assigned to assist Brigadier C.M.V. Catlock in monitoring possible "subversive activities" against the Allied nations and repatriating Soviet citizens living in the British zone of Vienna. He and his aides are billeted at a convent, led by the friendly Mother Superior. At this convent, Twingo is drawn to a ballerina who calls herself Maria Buhlen. He falls for her instantly and tries to meet her, but she is reluctant to, until they are officially introduced to each other by Mother Superior.

Twingo and Maria start spending time together until Soviet Colonel Piniev reports to Hooky, announcing that he is searching for a Russian ballerina named Olga Alexandrova, aka Maria Buhlen. Piniev assures Hooky that he means no harm to Olga and that it is his order to bring her back to the Soviet Union. Later that night, Maria and the Mother Superior reveal that Maria is actually Olga, a Volga German. Shortly later, the Soviets search the entire convent, looking for Maria. Hooky does not reveal his awareness of Maria's presence, as he does not want to put the Mother Superior's image in jeopardy. However, after the Russians leave without having found Maria, Hooky announces that he will turn her over to the Soviets the next day. After he observes Twingo trying to help Maria escape, an attempt that Maria declines because she does not want to endanger Hooky and Twingo's friendship, Hooky turns her over to the Soviets that night.

Hooky is reproved for his rigid obedience to duty by Twingo and the Mother Superior, but angrily shifts responsibility for what happened to the nun. He and Twingo continue their repatriation duties, and they announce to the Soviet Professor Serge Bruloff that he is about to be deported; Bruloff reacts by shooting himself. Hooky claims that there is no connection between Maria's reluctance to be deported to the Soviet Union and Serge's suicide, until the third person on his list, Helena Nagard, Serge's wife, responds by bursting into tears. When Piniev's aide tells Hooky that Bruloff's suicide was proof of "subversive activity and treasonable behavior," he starts to doubt the sincerity of the Soviets. After he witnesses Maria and Helena being forcibly deported to a harsh detainment camp, Hooky sends a brief to the War Office in London protesting the forcible repatriation of political dissidents.

On Christmas Eve, after the Mother Superior asks for his forgiveness for not treating him in a Christian manner, Hooky tells her that he lost his faith after the death of his son in combat. Catlock informs Hooky that the Soviets have sent into the British zone without authority a trainload of refugees. Hooky, enraged, goes to the train station to inspect them for subversive activities, where he witnesses the poor conditions the displaced persons are in. The Mother Superior, who accompanied him, notices Maria among the people in the train. Hooky upbraids the Soviets for their ploy, telling them he knows they staged the incident because they have no use for people too old or too young or too weak to work and are dumping them on the British. Hooky learns that Maria escaped from the Soviets and uses the technicality that she was on the train to bring her to safety and a reunion with Twingo.

When Hooky and Mother Superior are visited by Piniev, who is looking for Maria, they refuse to cooperate. The next day, in response to his brief, Hooky is ordered to fly to Rome as a representative to a United Nations conference to end forcible repatriation. The Mother Superior would very much like to seek an audience with the Pope on the same matter, and appears at the airfield despite Hooky explaining that she would not be allowed on an RAF transport. She assures him that if it is God's desire, it will be made possible. As they approach the plane before Hooky boards, the pair is accosted by a guard, who upbraids the nun for being in an unauthorized area. Hooky, who had begun to upbraid the guard for his sloppy appearance aggressively, shifts to defending the dignity and station of the nun.

While doing so, he attempts to don his overcoat, enlisting the guard's assistance. The guard snaps to and immediately becomes solicitous when he notices the four stars on the coat's epaulettes, which Hooky had mistaken for his own when leaving an earlier meeting with his commanding general. Hooky decides to roll with the misidentification and escorts Mother Superior onto the plane.

She is successful in seeing the Pontiff.

On his return, Piniev informs Hooky and Catlock that, unless Maria is surrendered immediately, the Soviets will cease cooperating with the British on more important matters. Catlock orders Hooky to do so, but he refuses and is removed from authority to face a court-martial. The pompous and rigid Colonel Omicron is appointed in his place. Twingo and Maria plan to move to Scotland when she is suddenly captured by Omicron, who intends to turn her in to Piniev. Realizing her fate, she jumps out of a window and is mortally injured. Before she dies, she confesses her sins - including attempting suicide - to Mother Superior, and professes her love for Twingo. Shortly after, Hooky is called before the General and, instead of being held to account for his earlier actions, is told that forcible repatriation has ended. He is being promoted to Brigadier to head a new operation called "Humanizing the Army", with special commendation from the General for his "creative" use of "special tactics" in carrying out the impersonation. Hooky, McPhimister, and Quail fly off together for London.

== Cast ==
- Walter Pidgeon as Col. Michael "Hooky" Nicobar
- Ethel Barrymore as The Mother Superior
- Peter Lawford as Maj. John "Twingo" McPhimister
- Angela Lansbury as Audrey Quail
- Janet Leigh as Maria Buhlen
- Louis Calhern as Col. Piniev
- Francis L. Sullivan as Col. Humphrey "Blinker" Omicron
- Melville Cooper as Private David Moonlight
- Robert Coote as Brigadier C.M.V. Catlock
- Alan Napier as The General
- Roman Toporow as 2nd Lieut. Maxim Omansky
- Tamara Shayne as Helena Nagard
- Kasia Orzazewski as Sister Kasimira

== Production ==
Shortly after the release of the novel Vespers in Vienna, Metro-Goldwyn-Mayer showed interest in a film adaptation, and production was set to start in June 1947. In January 1947, it was announced Irene Dunne, Spencer Tracy and Robert Taylor were set to star. In October 1947, some of the background footage was shot on location in Rome and Vienna. The film was shelved, however, and the original director Victor Saville was eventually replaced by George Sidney. Furthermore, the three principal actors withdrew and were replaced by Walter Pidgeon, Ethel Barrymore and Peter Lawford.

On October 14, 1948, it was announced Audrey Totter was slated to co-star as Audrey Quail. She was replaced by Angela Lansbury in early 1949. Agnes Moorehead briefly replaced Barrymore in March 1949.

For the scenes of the war camps, 1,500 starved-looking extras were sought. The crew admitted they were looking for real war refugees, but found that most of them were already looking too healthy. One crew member called it "the biggest casting problem since The Good Earth (1937)".

== Reception ==
Although MGM assigned an all-star cast and a big budget to The Red Danube, the film was a commercial failure. According to studio records, it earned $1,177,000 in the US and Canada and $682,000 overseas, resulting in a loss of $905,000.

Some criticized the film for being a propaganda film, "designed to make you hate Russia and recognize the Vatican as the true champion of freedom". Film Score Monthly, on the other hand, noted that film "struck a chord with reviewers" by "bringing humanity to a difficult subject" and having a message "not compromised by preachiness."

It was nominated for the Oscar for Best Art Direction (Cedric Gibbons, Hans Peters, Edwin B. Willis, and Hugh Hunt).
