= The Bishop (novel) =

Book by Bruce Marshall

- First edition (UK)
- Author: Bruce Marshall
- Publisher: Constable (UK); Doubleday (US)
- Publication date: 1970
- Publication place: Scotland
- Media type: Print (hardback)
- Pages: 278

The Bishop is a 1970 novel by Scottish writer Bruce Marshall.

== Plot summary ==
This novel is a sort of 'inside look" at the workings of a fictional Roman Catholic Bishop's headquarters in the United Kingdom.

The central characters are Bishop Bede Jenkins; Father Spyers, a young, recently ordained priest who serves as the Bishop's secretary; Monsignor Basil Powell, the Vicar General, who was once a Major in the Grenadier Guards; and Monsignor Finbar O'Flaherty, the administrator of the pro-Cathedral.

The story opens as Father Spyers opens a new encyclical, Humanae Vitae, which prohibits Catholics the use of chemical birth control methods (physical methods had long been banned). The process of implementing perhaps the most controversial papal bull released during the Church's second millennium supplies most of the activities of the story. Marshall introduces us to the discussions and arguments within the Catholic community during this time. The Bishop finds himself embroiled in fights with his superiors over his methods of implementing the decree. Father Spyers spends time in the hospital after being struck down by an angry husband.

Subplots include Monsignor Powell's counseling of a nun who wishes to leave the convent, problems that the Bishop's friend, an Anglican Bishop, experiences and the irreligious attitude of modern Englishmen. The novel touches on modern literature, the treatment of animals, modern art, cultural differences and Father Spyers' daydreams of his future papacy (and chooses Benedict XVI as his title).
