= Home Sweet Homicide =

1946 film by Lloyd Bacon

- Movie poster
- Directed by: Lloyd Bacon
- Written by: F. Hugh Herbert
- Based on: Home Sweet Homicide by Craig Rice
- Produced by: Louis D. Dighton
- Starring: Peggy Ann Garner; Randolph Scott; Lynn Bari; Dean Stockwell
- Cinematography: John Seitz
- Edited by: Louis Loeffler
- Music by: David Buttolph
- Production company: 20th Century-Fox
- Distributed by: 20th Century-Fox
- Release date: October 2, 1946
- Running time: 90 minutes
- Country: United States
- Language: English

Home Sweet Homicide is a 1946 American comedy mystery film directed by Lloyd Bacon and starring Peggy Ann Garner, Randolph Scott and Lynn Bari. It was based on the 1944 eponymous mystery novel by Craig Rice. Though he would make a further 39 films, Home Sweet Homicide is the second-to-last non-western film of Randolph Scott's career.

== Plot ==
When gunshots are heard next door, the three children of widowed mystery novelist Marian Carstairs try to help the police help their mother solve the case or solve it themselves.

Polly Walker, an actress, runs from the neighbors' house, telling police lieutenant Bill Smith that she had gone there to see Flora Sanford and found her dead. Flora was an agent who represented Polly as well as Marian, whose books feature a detective character with the same name as Bill's.

Various suspects are considered, including other neighbors and Flora's hiding husband, who had fallen in love with Polly and wanted a divorce. The children begin sending anonymous letters, believing they are helping the investigation, until Bill finally persuades them to let him handle the case. He solves it, then expresses a romantic interest in Marian, pleasing the kids.

== Cast ==
- Randolph Scott as Lt. Smith
- Peggy Ann Garner as Dinah
- Lynn Bari as Marian
- Dean Stockwell as Archie
- Connie Marshall as April
- Stanley Logan as Cherrington
- Anabel Shaw as Polly
- Barbara Whiting as Jo-Ella Holbrook
- James Gleason as Sgt. O'Hare
- Sheppard Strudwick as Wallace Sanford
- Lenita Lane as Mrs. Flora Sanford
- Olin Howland as Luke
- Marietta Canty as Cherrington Housekeeper
- Pat Flaherty as Murphy
- James Seay as Frank Riley

== Bibliography ==
- Goble, Alan. The Complete Index to Literary Sources in Film. Walter de Gruyter, 1999.
