= F. F. E. Yeo-Thomas =

British Special Operations Executive agent (1902–1964)

Tommy Yeo-Thomas
- Photograph of Yeo-Thomas taken eight hours before he parachuted into occupied France in September 1943
- Born: Forest Frederick Edward Yeo-Thomas; 17 June 1902; London, England
- Died: 26 February 1964 (aged 61); Paris, France
- Military career
- Allegiance: United Kingdom
- Branch: Royal Air Force
- Rank: Wing commander
- Nickname: Tommy
- Service number: 39215
- Unit: Special Operations Executive
- Conflicts: Polish-Soviet War; Second World War
- Awards: George Cross; Military Cross & Bar; Legion of Honour (France); Croix de guerre (France); Cross of Merit (Poland)

Wing Commander Forest Frederick Edward Yeo-Thomas (17 June 1902 – 26 February 1964), known as "Tommy", was a British Special Operations Executive (SOE) agent in the Second World War. Codenamed "Seahorse" and "Shelley" in the SOE, Yeo-Thomas was known by the Gestapo as "The White Rabbit". His particular sphere of operations was Occupied and Vichy France. He was one of the most highly decorated agents in the Second World War.

== Early life ==
Forest Frederick Edward Yeo-Thomas was born in London to John Yeo Thomas, a coal merchant, and Daisy Ethel Thomas (born Burrows). Early in his life, his family moved to Dieppe, France. He spoke both English and French fluently. Lying about his age, he enlisted in the US Army at the age of 16 and served on the Western Front as a dispatch rider in 1918. He saw action in the Polish-Soviet War of 1919 and 1920, fighting alongside the Poles. He was captured by the Soviet forces and avoided execution by escaping, in the process strangling a Soviet guard.

Between the wars, Yeo-Thomas held a number of jobs. He trained as an apprentice engineer with Rolls-Royce then became an accountant for a firm of travel agents before joining Molyneux in 1932, a fashion-house in Paris, rising to become a director.

== Early RAF service ==
On the outbreak of war in 1939, Yeo-Thomas was still living in France. He attempted to join the British Army but was turned down as they had received enough recruits at that stage of the war. He then attempted to join the French Foreign Legion but they were not accepting Britons. After placing his car at the service of the British Air Attaché in France he was granted permission to join the RAF in September 1939.

He applied to be trained as an air gunner but this application was rejected due to his age, instead he was enlisted as an AC2 (the lowest rank possible) in the Intelligence Branch taking up the trade of interpreter. His first posting was to a forward air ammunition park with the Advanced Air Striking Force (AASF) in France. He was soon promoted to corporal and then acting sergeant before being posted back to HQ Fighter Command and a Bomber Liaison Section at RAF Stanmore Park in England. While stationed here he met his second 'wife' Barbara who was then a young WAAF. At this point, a second application to become an air gunner was refused.

Posted back to France in April 1940, Yeo-Thomas was based at Le Bourget Aerodrome when he was caught up in the rapid German advance. In June 1940 he withdrew with his unit, travelling 800 km across France via Tours, Limoges and Bordeaux - finally sailing to England from Pointe de Grave. Before embarking on a ship to England he purchased a postcard from a stall at the monument commemorating the landing of American troops in France 1917, he sent it to a friend with the prophetic words "I know how you are feeling at present, but don't get discouraged. We will return and liberate France."

Back in England, he was assigned to work as an interpreter with the Free French Forces before being recommended for a commission by his commanding officer. He was commissioned as a pilot officer in the Administrative and Special Duties Branch of the RAFVR on 28 November 1940 and posted to No. 308 Polish Fighter Squadron as an intelligence officer, receiving further promotion to flying officer on 28 November 1941. After repeated complaints about his misemployment, and threatening to raise the issue in Parliament, he was posted to RF Section of the Special Operations Executive in February 1942.

== Life as an agent ==
At first, Yeo-Thomas worked in an administrative capacity, but SOE soon used him as a liaison officer with the Bureau Central de Renseignements et d'Action (BCRA), the Free French intelligence agency. He was parachuted into occupied France for the first time on 25 February 1943. Both within France and back in England, Yeo-Thomas forged links with Major Pierre Brossolette and Andre Dewavrin (who went under the codename "Colonel Passy"), and between them they created a strategy for obstructing the German occupation of France. During his missions in France, he dined with many infamous Nazis, such as Klaus Barbie who was known as the "Butcher of Lyon", to gather vital information, returning again to France on 18 September 1943. He was appalled by the lack of logistical and material support which the French resistance movements such as the maquis were receiving, to the extent that he begged five minutes with Winston Churchill, the British Prime Minister. Churchill, reluctant at first, but fascinated by what Yeo-Thomas told him, agreed to help him obtain resources for the resistance. During his captivity, he was in the same train with captured spy Violette Szabo, and Szabo helped keep up his spirits by bringing him water during the guards' brief absence.

In February 1944, Yeo-Thomas was parachuted into France after flying from RAF Tempsford. However, he was betrayed and captured at the Passy metro station in Paris. In endeavouring to hide his true identity, Yeo-Thomas claimed he was a British pilot named Kenneth Dodkin. He was then taken by the Gestapo to their headquarters at Avenue Foch and subjected to brutal torture by Ernst Misselwitz, including repeated submersion in ice-cold water (each time to the point that artificial respiration was required to bring him back to consciousness), innumerable beatings, and electric shocks applied to the genitals. Held in Fresnes prison, he made two failed attempts to escape and was transferred first to Compiègne prison and then to Buchenwald concentration camp. At Buchenwald with the help of Arthur Dietzsch he was committed to block 46, the Epidemic Typhus Experimentation Station (Fleckfieberversuchsstation) as a typhus patient. With Stéphane Hessel and Harry Peulevé he was given the name of a Frenchman (Maurice Choquet) who had died a short time earlier and whose death had not yet been reported. Under this new identity he survived as "a hospital orderly," being later transferred to "Willie," one of the many sub-camps of Buchenwald, at Tröglitz/Rehmsdorf in Saxony-Anhalt. The inmates were deployed there (from June 1944) primarily in the reconstruction of a coal liquefaction plant destroyed by allied bombing, which belonged to the Brabag company. Within the camp, he began to organize resistance and again made a brief escape. On his recapture he passed himself off as a French national and was sent to a prisoner-of-war camp, Stalag XX-B, near Marienburg.

While at Buchenwald, Yeo-Thomas met Squadron Leader Phil Lamason, the officer in charge of 168 Allied airmen, also being held there. At great risk, Yeo-Thomas assisted Lamason in getting word out of the camp to the German Luftwaffe of the airmen's captivity, knowing that RAF prisoners of war were the responsibility of the Luftwaffe, not of the Gestapo. He had to don many disguises, as well as shooting an enemy agent point blank with a pistol, to escape. Eventually he succeeded in escaping, leading 10 French prisoners of war through German patrols to the American lines in April 1945.

== After the war ==
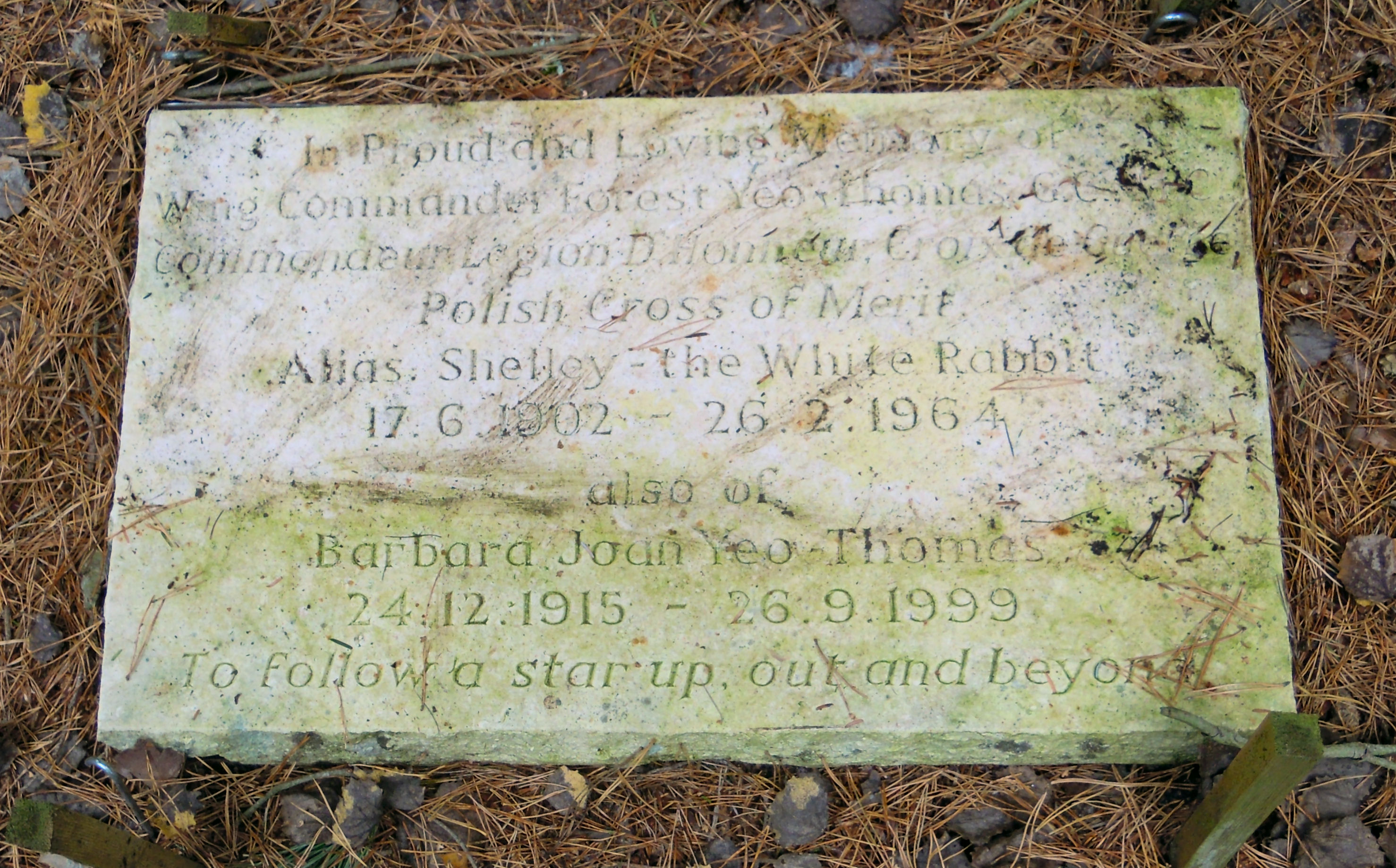
Marker for Yeo-Thomas' ashes in Brookwood Cemetery

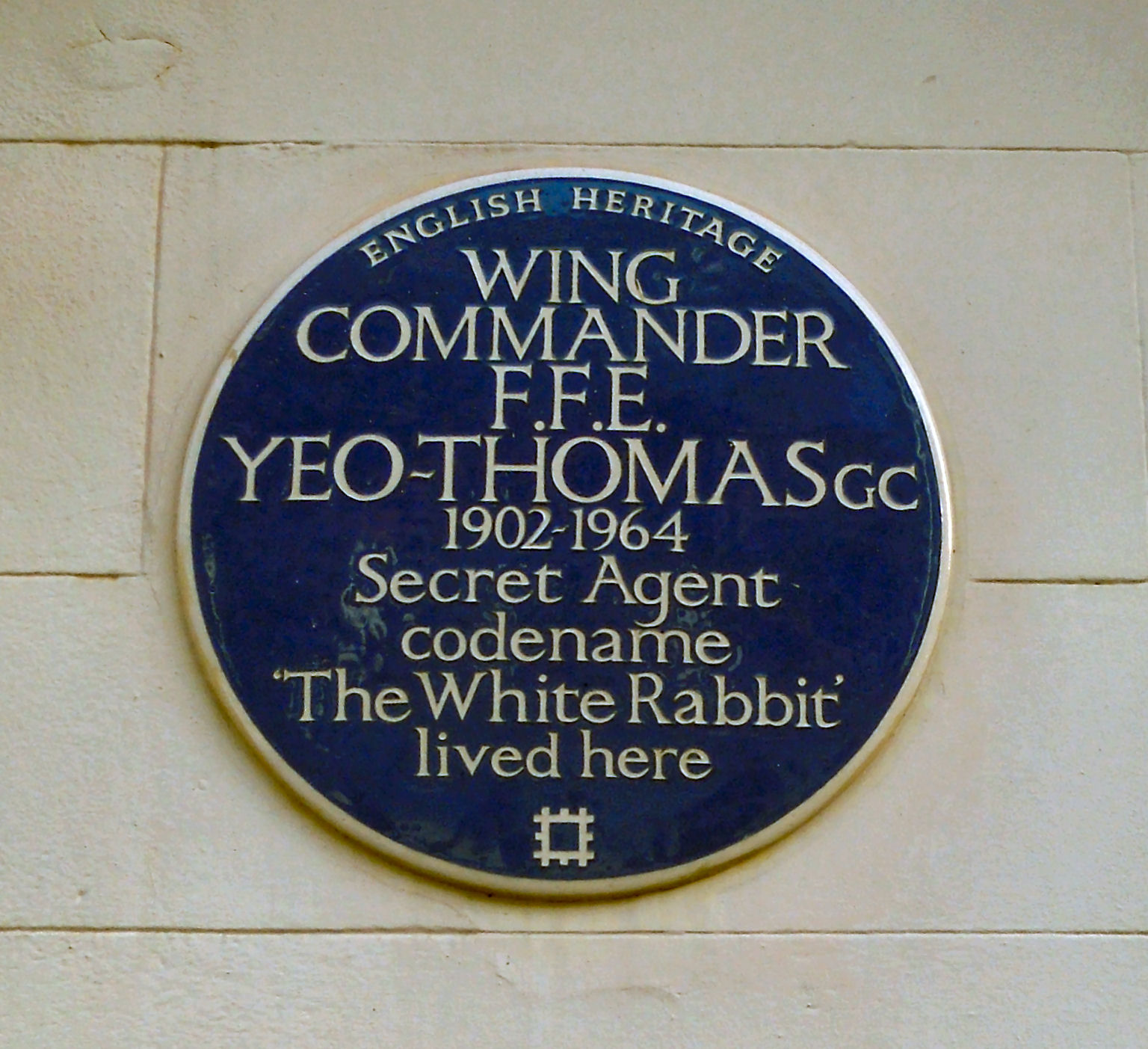
The blue plaque on Yeo-Thomas' flat in Guilford Street

After the war, Yeo-Thomas was to be an important witness at the Nuremberg trials in the identification of Buchenwald officials. He was a key prosecution witness at the Buchenwald trial held at Dachau Concentration Camp between April and August 1947. At this trial, 31 members of the Buchenwald staff were convicted of war crimes. He was also a surprise defence witness in the war crimes trial of Otto Skorzeny, particularly on the charge of Skorzeny's use of American uniforms in infiltrating American lines. Yeo-Thomas testified that he and his operatives wore German uniforms behind enemy lines while working for the SOE.

He died at the age of 61 in his Paris apartment following a massive haemorrhage. He was cremated in Paris and then subsequently repatriated to be interred in Brookwood Cemetery, Surrey, where his grave is in the Pine Glade Garden of Remembrance. In March 2010 his life was commemorated with an English Heritage blue plaque erected at his flat in Queen Court where he lived in Guilford Street, Bloomsbury.

== Awards and honours ==
Yeo-Thomas's medal list:

UK	George Cross
UK	Military Cross & Bar
UK	1939-45 Star
UK	France and Germany Star
UK	Defence Medal
UK	War Medal 1939-45
UK	Queen Elizabeth II Coronation Medal
France	Légion d'honneur (Commander)
France	Croix de Guerre with palm, 4 bronze palm leaves
France	Croix du combattant volontaire de la Résistance
France	Deported for acts of resistance medal
Poland	Gold Cross of Merit with Swords
USA	World War I Victory Medal

Yeo-Thomas's George Cross and other medals were displayed within the, now removed, Lord Ashcroft Gallery at the Imperial War Museum.

The Mairie of the 16th Arrondissement in Paris (where the Passy Metro Station is located) has a bust of Yeo-Thomas.

=== George Cross citation ===
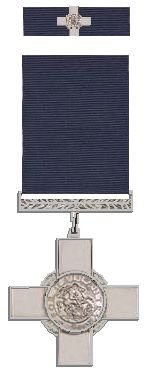
George Cross and its ribbon bar

The London Gazette 15 February 1946 citation read:

The KING has been graciously pleased to award the George Cross to Acting Wing Commander Forest Frederick Edward YEO-THOMAS, M.C. (89215), Royal Air Force Volunteer Reserve.

This officer was parachuted into France on 25th February 1943. He showed much courage and initiative during his mission, particularly when he enabled a French officer who was being followed by a Gestapo agent in Paris to reach safety and resume clandestine work in another area. He also took charge of a U.S. Army Air Corps officer who had been shot down and, speaking no French, was in danger of capture. This officer returned to England on the 15th April 1943, in the aircraft which picked up Wing Commander Yeo-Thomas.

Wing Commander Yeo-Thomas undertook a second mission on the 17th September 1943. Soon after his arrival in France, many patriots were arrested. Undeterred, he continued his enquires and obtained information which enabled the desperate situation to be rectified. On six occasions, he narrowly escaped arrest. He returned to England on the 15th November 1943, bringing British intelligence archives which he had secured from a house watched by the Gestapo.

This officer was again parachuted into France in February, 1944. Despite every security precaution, he was betrayed to the Gestapo in Paris on the 21st March. While being taken by car to Gestapo Headquarters he was badly "beaten up". He then underwent 4 days continuous interrogation, interspersed with beatings and torture, including immersions, head downwards, in ice-cold water, with legs and arms chained. Interrogations later continued for 2 months and Wing Commander Yeo-Thomas was offered his freedom in return for information concerning the Head of a Resistance Secretariat. Owing to his wrist being cut by chains, he contracted blood-poisoning and nearly lost his left arm. He made two daring but unsuccessful attempts to escape. He was then confined in solitude in Fresnes prison for 4 months, including 3 weeks in a darkened cell with very little food. Throughout these months of almost continuous torture, he steadfastly refused to disclose any information.

On the 17th July, Wing Commander Yeo-Thomas was sent with a party to Compiègne prison, from which he twice attempted to escape. He and 36 others were transferred to Buchenwald. On the way, they stopped at Saarbrücken, where they were beaten and kept in a tiny hut. They arrived at Buchenwald on the 16th August and 16 of them were executed and cremated on the 10th September. Wing Commander Yeo-Thomas had already commenced to organise resistance within the camp and remained undaunted by the prospect of a similar fate. He accepted an opportunity of changing his identity with that of a dead French prisoner, on condition that other officers would also be enabled to do so. In this way, he was instrumental in saving the lives of two officers.

Wing Commander Yeo-Thomas was later transferred to a work kommando for Jews. In attempting to escape, he was picked up by a German patrol and, claiming French nationality, was transferred to a camp near Marienburg for French prisoners of war. On the 16th April, 1945, he led a party of 20 in a most gallant attempt to escape in broad daylight. 10 of them were killed by gunfire from the guards. Those who reached cover split up into small groups. Wing Commander Yeo-Thomas became separated from his companions after 3 days without food. He continued alone for a week and was recaptured when only 800 yards from the American lines. A few days later, he escaped with a party of 10 French prisoners of war, whom he led through German patrols to the American lines.

Wing Commander Yeo-Thomas thus turned his final mission into a success by his determined opposition to the enemy, his strenuous efforts to maintain the morale of his fellow prisoners and his brilliant escape activities. He endured brutal treatment and torture without flinching and showed the most amazing fortitude and devotion to duty throughout his service abroad, during which he was under the constant threat of death.

== In popular culture ==
- Ian Fleming wrote in his memoirs of his fascination with the military career of Forest Thomas, becoming one of the inspirations behind the fictional character James Bond
- Michael Caine in the 1958 film Carve Her Name with Pride (minor uncredited appearance)
- Kenneth More in the BBC 1967 television mini-series The White Rabbit (1967)
- Peter Hudson in the 2008 French television mini-series La Résistance

== Bibliography about Yeo-Thomas ==
- Bruce Marshall, The White Rabbit (1952)
- Mark Seaman, Bravest of the Brave: True Story of Wing Commander Tommy Yeo-Thomas – SOE Secret Agent Codename, the White Rabbit (1997)
- Brigitte Friang, Parachutes and Petticoats (1958)
- Leo Marks, Between Silk and Cyanide: A Codemaker's Story 1941-1945 (1998)
- Sophie Jackson, Churchill's White Rabbit (2012)
