= Father Malachy's Miracle =

Book by Bruce Marshall

- First edition
- Author: Bruce Marshall
- Language: English
- Published: Heinemann 1931 (UK)
- Publication place: Scotland
- Media type: Print (Hardback)
- Pages: 201
- Preceded by: Children of This Earth (1930)
- Followed by: Prayer for the Living (1934)

Father Malachy's Miracle is a 1931 novel by the Scottish writer Bruce Marshall.

== Plot summary ==
The book sits in a small collection of Anglo-Catholic & Roman Catholic novels alongside The Chalice and the Sword by Ernest Raymond and Twenty years at St Hilary by Bernard Walke. All the authors knew each other through their discovery of Roman Catholicism via Anglo-Catholicism. The names of people and places in the book are only slightly changed. The Church of St Margaret is in fact the RC Cathedral Church of St. Mary in Broughton Street/61 York Place at the top of Leith Walk, Edinburgh. St Gabriel's Church is St Michaels, Hill Square, Edinburgh. The Reverend Denis Meaty being Father Beattie. The "Garden of Eden", a dance hall of dubious reputation, was the Kosmo Club in Little King Street in the shadow of the cathedral. The "Garden of Eden" is a thorn in the side of the innocent and unworldly Benedictine Catholic priest Father Malachy, who is praying to God that He will close the dance hall.

During an argument with a Protestant minister, in real life the Rector of St Pauls, York Place. Father Malachy claims that God could miraculously remove the "Garden of Eden". The skeptical Protestant scoffs and Father Malachy inadvertently predicts that God will indeed remove the "Garden of Eden" on a specific date.

Many people, including Father Malachy's superiors, attempt to persuade him to retract his prediction. He refuses. The date comes and the building and all the people inside do indeed vanish, reappearing on Bass Rock, a small island in the Firth of Forth. This apparent miracle draws the attention of the media, politicians and scientists, all trying to find rational explanations. The Catholic Church is reluctant to officially recognize this occurrence as a miracle, fearing either a loss of control in matters of faith, or a loss of face if the disappearance of the "Garden of Eden" should turn out to be a hoax or fabrication.

Meanwhile, believers from all over the world come on pilgrimage to the former location of the dance hall. Soon the site becomes a fairground, with the town's people, entrepreneurs and journalists trying to make a profit from the miracle and the resulting sudden influx of pilgrims. This includes the sale of holy water and miniature models of the "Garden of Eden". A young woman, who was in the dance hall during the night it vanished, becomes a media star. Financial investors buy the island where the "Garden of Eden" reappeared, and construct a casino that soon attracts crowds of people.

Father Malachy is confronted with interview requests from journalists, and pilgrims beleaguer the church, hoping to meet the miracle-working priest. As he has spent most of his life in the monastery, he feels helpless in the face of the excesses of modern society. He soon regrets that he asked God for the miracle. He travels to the island and prays for a second miracle that will end the frenzy. God answers his prayer and returns the "Garden of Eden" to its original location.

== Film ==
The novel was the basis for the German film Das Wunder des Malachias, a 1961 black-and-white film directed by Bernhard Wicki and starring Horst Bollmann. The film won several awards.

== Translations ==
- Marshall, Bruce. 2023. Čudo oca Malahije (in Croatian), translator: Mijo Pavić; Verbum: Split. ISBN 978-953-235-833-9.
