= Vespers in Vienna =

Book by Bruce Marshall

- First edition
- Author: Bruce Marshall
- Language: English
- Genre: Novel
- Published: 1947
- Publisher: Houghton Mifflin
- Publication place: Scotland
- Media type: Print (Hardback)
- Pages: 280
- Preceded by: George Brown's Schooldays (1946)
- Followed by: To Every Man a Penny (1949)

Vespers in Vienna is a 1947 novel by Scottish writer Bruce Marshall. It was the basis of the 1949 film The Red Danube starring Walter Pidgeon, Ethel Barrymore, Peter Lawford, Angela Lansbury, and Janet Leigh. George Sidney directed.

After the movie was released, the novel was re-issued as The Red Danube.

The Red Danube

== Plot summary ==
Shortly after the end of World War II, British Army Colonel Michael 'Hooky' Nicobar is assigned to the Displaced Persons Division in the British Zone of Vienna, Allied-occupied Austria. Like the author himself, Nicobar has had a limb amputated. Marshall also served in the Displaced Persons Division in Austria.

Nicobar's orders are to aid the Soviet Red Army and the NKVD in the forcible repatriation of alleged citizens of the Soviet Union as part of Operation Keelhaul. Billeted in the convent run by Mother Auxilia, Nicobar and his military aides Major John 'Twingo' McPhimister and Audrey Quail become involved in the plight of Maria, a young Volga German ballerina, who is trying to avoid being returned to Moscow; as she, like many other refugees, correctly expects torture, execution, or the Gulag immediately upon returning to the USSR. Colonel Nicobar's sense of duty and honour are tested to the breaking point as he sees firsthand the plight of the people he is forcibly repatriating to the Soviet Union. His Agnosticism is also shaken by his contact with the Mother Superior.
