= Home Sweet Homicide (novel) =

1944 comedic mystery novel by Craig Rice

- First edition
- Author: Craig Rice
- Language: English
- Genre: Mystery
- Published: 1944 (Simon & Schuster)
- Publication place: United States
- ISBN: 978-0915230532

Home Sweet Homicide is a 1944 comedic mystery novel written by American author Craig Rice, following the story of three young siblings as they investigate a murder in their neighborhood. The novel was adapted into a film of the same name in 1946.

== Plot summary ==
Widowed mystery writer Marian Carstairs is a mother of three living off the sales of her books. Her children, Dinah (14), April (12), and Archie (10), inspired by reading their mother’s fictitious mystery novels, decide to take part in some amateur sleuthing when they hear shots in the house next door. Understanding detective work from the novels, they take specific notes on clues that they encounter, but they also falsify their testimonies to the cops with the end goal of crediting the solved case back to their mother for publicity purposes. In addition to their detective work, the children also attempt to romantically connect the handsome police lieutenant, Bill Smith, on the case with their mother.

== Style and themes ==
Home Sweet Homicide is a slight diversion from Rice’s regular style of novel due to the absence of alcohol and focus on children, rather than a character similar to the hard-drinking womanizer, The Amazing Mr. Malone, who appears often in Rice’s most famous series of novels. Home Sweet Homicide is also thought to be a semi-autobiography of Rice, but the similarities to her life are very few and far between.

== Publications and adaptations ==
The novel was published by Simon & Schuster in 1944, and Rice immediately started to try and find a movie producer to take on the story for a sum of $50,000. However, after no sales all through 1944, Rice conceded to 20th Century Fox’s offer of $20,000 for the adaptation of Home Sweet Homicide. This sale earned Rice a spot on the January 28th, 1946 cover of Time Magazine. After a 50 year spell of dormancy out of print, Home Sweet Homicide began to gain popularity again with Jeffrey Marks’s 2001 biography of Craig Rice, Who Was That Lady.

== Reception ==
The Saturday Review declared the novel "delightful" with an "artfully deceptive plot, vast supply of good fun, and ample excitement," and the Carstairs "the most amusing children since Penrod."
