= Only Fade Away =

Book by Bruce Marshall

- First edition (UK)
- Author: Bruce Marshall
- Publisher: Constable (UK); Houghton Mifflin (US)
- Publication date: 1954
- Publication place: Scotland
- Media type: Print (hardback)
- Pages: 303

Only Fade Away is a 1954 novel by Scottish writer Bruce Marshall.

== Plot summary ==
A change of pace for Marshall, this book is only peripherally concerned with matters of faith and religion. Strang Methuen is an old soldier, a stiff-necked Scot who serves in the British Army in two world wars. Methuen is able to show more courage in the face of enemy fire than when dealing with friends and family—those he loves and hates.

Methuen has been bullied since his school days by Hermiston. For nearly 40 years, every time he thinks he has escaped or defeated the bully, a quirk of fate makes Methuen the goat again.

The very qualities that keep him from winning, integrity and personal honour, also make him a sympathetic and interesting character.

A revelation about his beloved daughter almost crushes Methuen, but he recovers. The story ends when Methuen, now a brigadier general fighting in World War II Italy, uses his experience and wiles to perform a vital military manoeuvre, preventing a major defeat. Unfortunately Hermiston, in an attempt to finally put things right, makes a confession which puts Methuen's achievement in a bad light. He is demoted and leaves the service in disgrace.

== Publication ==
The novel selected by the Vancouver Province as a Province Book-of-the-Week and was published in full as a supplement in the paper's July 9, 1955 edition.
