= Trust Me (short story collection) =

1959 book by John Updike

Trust Me: Short Stories
- First edition cover
- Author: John Updike
- Language: English
- Genre: Short Stories
- Publisher: Alfred A. Knopf
- Publication date: 1987
- Publication place: United States
- Media type: Print (hardcover)
- Pages: 302
- ISBN: 978-0394558332

Trust Me: Short Stories is a collection of 19 works of short fiction by John Updike. Each story originally appeared in The New Yorker or other literary journals. The stories were collected in 1987 by Alfred A. Knopf.

== Stories ==
The stories in the collection first appeared in The New Yorker, unless otherwise indicated.

- "Trust Me" (July 16, 1979)
- "More Stately Mansions" (Esquire, October 1982)
- "Still of Some Use" (October 6, 1980)
- "The Lovely Troubled Daughters of Our Old Crowd" (April 6, 1981)
- "Pygmalion" (The Atlantic Monthly, July 1981)
- "The City" (November 16, 1981)
- "Learn a Trade" (December 28, 1981)
- "The Ideal Village" (Ontario Review 17, Fall-Winter 1982-83)
- "Deaths of Distant Friends" (June 7, 1982)
- "The Other" (August 15, 1983)
- "One More Interview" (July 4, 1983)
- "Slippage" (February 20, 1984)
- "Poker Night" (Esquire, August 1984)
- "Made in Heaven" (The Atlantic Monthly, April, 1985)
- "Getting Into the Set" (Vanity Fair, October 1984)
- "The Wallet" Yankee, September, 1985)
- "The Other Woman" (December 23, 1985)
- "Beautiful Husbands" (Playboy, January 1987)
- "Leaf Season" (October 13, 1986)

== Critical assessment ==
Literary critic Marilynne Robinson at The New York Times writes:

There are other stories in this collection I find estimable, and others still whose virtues it is not in my gift to discover. At the end I find myself searching for language to describe the very palpable pleasure that comes with experiencing in a writer authority and also humor and elegance and honesty and generosity of spirit.

Literary scholar Robert M. Luscher notes a stylistic shift in Trust Me in that “the highly adjectival style has been replaced with a slightly leaner one that accentuates his poetic precision and makes it even more evident that his command of the language exceeds that of most of his contemporaries.”

== Theme ==
Updike’s “thematic concern with trust” is an examination of mostly middle-aged or elderly New England suburbanites who are “increasingly conscious of death, aging and illness.” Literary critic Robert M. Luscher writes:

[T]he thematic concern with trust resonates throughout the entire book…“Trust Me” can be the plea of a confidence man, the ploy of the sexual opportunist, the last ditch appeal of a friend who continually betrays - or merely the reassurance of loved ones who mistakenly believe in their ability to provide happiness and security…Updike combines a detached sympathy for his characters’ plights with honest exposure of their shortcomings. If his protagonists often do not confront the hard questions of existence head on, most are at least aware of the price they pay for security and the terror that the particulars of daily life imperfectly mask.

“Updike reasserts himself as Joyce’s successor in refining the epiphanic short story in Trust Me…Full of poignant, expertly crafted tales and interspersed with controlled flashes of his distinctive prose, it may be his best and most consistent effort thus far.”—Literary critic Robert M Luscher in John Updike: A Study of the Short Fiction (1993)

The dust jacket, portraying 19th Century artist Picart’s The Fall of Icarus (1731) was selected by Updike and is consistent with the volume’s theme. Critic Robert M. Lischer writes: “While Daedalus has instructed his son to [use his wings] prudently, Icarus betrays his trust, succumbing to the temptation to soar close to the sun…Updike has provided an appropriate mythological parallel before we even open the first story, since these issues— broken trust, family bonds, the fragile nature of promises, and our inevitable falls— are central to the stories within.”

== Sources ==
- Luscher, Robert M. 1993. John Updike: A Study of the Short Fiction. Twayne Publishers, New York. ISBN 0-8057-0850-2
- Carduff, Christopher. 2013. Ref. 2 Note on the Texts in John Updike: Collected Early Stories. Christopher Carduff, editor. The Library of America. pp. 948–958 ISBN 978-1-59853-252-4
- Robinson, Marilynne. 1987. At Play in the Backyard of the Psyche. The New York Times, Book Review Desk. https://archive.nytimes.com/www.nytimes.com/books/97/04/06/lifetimes/updike-trustme.html Retrieved 6 March 2023.
