= Museums and Women and Other Stories =

- First edition cover
- Author: John Updike
- Language: English
- Genre: Short story collection
- Publisher: Alfred A. Knopf
- Publication date: 1972
- Publication place: United States
- Media type: Print (hardcover)
- Pages: 282
- ISBN: 0-394-48173-9
- OCLC: 722247

Museums and Women and Other Stories is a collection of 29 works of short fiction by John Updike, first appearing individually in literary journals. The stories were collected by Alfred A. Knopf in 1972.

== Stories ==
[The year refers to the “date of composition” (completed draft) as quoted in the index of ‘1953-1975 The Early Stories’ collection]

3 sections:

· "Museums and Women" 1962

· "The Hillies" 1969

· "The Day of the Dying Rabbit" 1968

· "The Deacon" 1969

· "I will not let thee go, except thou bless me" 1969

· "The Corner" 1969

· "The Witnesses" 1965

· "Solitaire" 1962

· "The Orphaned Swimming Pool" 1969

· "When Everyone Was Pregnant" 1971

· "Man and Daughter in the Cold" 1968

· "I am Dying, Egypt, Dying" 1969 [included in the limited edition book 'Three Trips' (2003)]

· "The Carol Sing" 1970

· "Plumbing" 1970 [a Maples story included in ‘Too Far To Go’ (1979) and ‘The Maples Stories’ (2009)]

Other Modes

· "The Sea's Green Sameness" 1960

· "The Slump" 1967

· “The Pro” 1966 #

· “One of My Generation” 1969 #

· “God Speaks” [1^{st} titled "Deus Dixit"] 1965 #

· "Under the Microscope" 1967

· "During the Jurassic" 1965

· "The Baluchitherium" 1971

· "The Invention of the Horse Collar" 1971

· "Jesus on Honshu" 1971

The Maples [all included in ‘Too Far To Go’ (1979) and ‘The Maples Stories’ (2009)]

· "Marching Through Boston" 1965

· "The Taste of Metal" 1966

· "Your Lover Just Called" 1966

· "Eros Rampant" 1967

· "Sublimating" 1971

# omitted by J. Updike for the ‘1953-1975 The Early Stories’ collection

The following stories first appeared in The New Yorker, unless otherwise noted.

- "Museums and Women" (November 18, 1967)
- "The Hillies" (December 20, 1969)
- "The Deacon" (February 21, 1970)
- "I Will Not Let Thee Go, Except Thou Bless Me" (October 11, 1969)
- "The Corner" (May 24, 1969)
- "The Witnesses" (August 13, 1966)
- "Solitaire" (January 22, 1972)
- "The Orphaned Swimming Pool" (June 27, 1970)
- "When Everyone Was Pregnant" (Audience, November–December 1971)
- "Man and Daughter in the Cold" (March 9, 1968)
- "During the Jurassic" (The Transatlantic Review, Summer 1966)
- "I Am Dying, Egypt, Dying" (Playboy, September 1969)
- "The Carol Sing" (December 19, 1970)
- "Plumbing" (February 20, 1971)
- "The Sea's Green Sameness" (New World Writing, Fall 1960)
- "The Pro" (September 17, 1966)
- "The Slump" (Esquire, July 1968)
- "Under the Microscope" (The Transatlantic Review, Spring 1968)
- "The Day of the Dying Rabbit" (August 30, 1969)
- "Cemeteries" (The Transatlantic Review, Summer 1969)
- "One of My Generation" (November 15, 1969)
- "The Baluchitherium" (August 14, 1971)
- "The Invention of the Horse Collar" (The Transatlantic Review, Spring-Summer 1972)
- "Jesus on Honshu" (December 25, 1971)
- "God Speaks" (Esquire, September 1965 [titled "Deus Dixit"])

== Reception ==
"Updike's most tender reverence is reserved for women's bodies. The elegant style with which he describes female anatomy often becomes overwrought, as his descriptions do generally. But it always conveys wonder. Even in the many explicit accounts of sexual activity, some of them ludicrous and even perhaps pornographic, there is an awe for the physical aspect of women. This form of adoration is far from a consideration of women's needs...but it is a kind of naive appreciation."—Literary critic Mary Allen from The Necessary Blankness: Women in Major American Fiction of the Sixties. (1976)

As to the critical response to Museums and Women, appraisals of the collection were few "perhaps because reviewers felt there was not really much to say" according to literary critic William R. Macnaughton. The collection is composed of 25 tales, of which 10 are sketches and fables, and 5 more that continue the To Far to Go: The Maples Stories saga of Joan and Richard Maple.

Literary critic Tony Tanner writing in The New York Times Book Review offers a mixed appraisal of the collection. Tanner notes:

Updike's narrator writes with sympathy and insight about women. But despite his sensitivity, he fails to persuade me of the genuineness of his experience of love...I find it hard to think of any character in Updike's work who is convincing in his or her inner plenitude."

Tanner adds that "most of the stories are extremely readable, not one of them without some moments of dazzling minute observation...some abrupt accuracy about the harassments and consolations of day-to-day living...The thought occurred to me that Updike may be a better short-story writer than he is a novelist..."

Literary critic Robert M Luscher reports that Updike's skill at developing his characters has not diminished in this volume, but rather chronicles a decline in the circumstances of his protagonists.:

[It] is Updike's characters...that have lost the energy to fuel the push through the doors of memory or the ability to devise plausible harmonies amid maturity's discord. Their emotional peaks have leveled out, and fatigue is more frequent; numerous characters mention how "tired" they are from struggling to maintain the status quo...

== Style and theme ==
Novelist Joyce Carol Oates locates the key thematic elements of the collection in its title:

Museums and Women makes the point explicitly that both "museums" and "women" are mysterious structures which, once entered, once explored, somehow lose their mystery; yet they...attract the artist again and again."

The title story "Museums and Woman" reveals that the narrator's mother introduced him to museums when he was a child, attempting to instill in the boy a sense of his own destiny. Literary critic Mary Allen writes:

The museum with its valuable holdings of the past may be an apt metaphor for the mother with its emphasis on "radiance, antiquity, mystery and duty" Updike makes a specific attempt to define his view of women in general...The narrator's view of his mother however, is contradicted by the woman he chooses for his wife, who does not faintly resemble his mother."

The stories in Museums and Women are narrated by the fictional character William Young, "an Updike alter ego", who offers a "meditative reminiscence" of six women he had accompanied to art museums. Literary critic Robert Detwieler writes:

The recounting of his relationships to these six merges with the imagery of four terms he finds evoked by the two key title words—museums and women. It is portentous that the Maple tales conclude Museums and Women, for virtually all of Updike's fiction written since then stresses the pleasures and agonies of those who love neither wisely nor well. It is, however, short-sighted to conclude, from reading the Museums and Women stories...that "marriage is a relic." The marriage bonds are indeed vulnerable to the extreme [but] they are also as resilient as anything that exists.

== Sources ==
- Allen, Mary. 1976. John Updike's Love of "Dull Bovine Beauty" from The Necessary Blankness: Women in Major American Fiction of the Sixties. University of Illinois Press (1976), in John Updike: Modern Critical Views (1987), Harold Bloom, editor. pp. 69–95 ISBN 0-87754-717-3
- Carduff, Christopher. 2013. Note on the Texts in John Updike: Collected Early Stories. Christopher Carduff, editor. The Library of America. pp. 910–924 ISBN 978-1-59853-251-7
- Detweiler, Robert. 1984. John Updike. Twayne Publishers, G. K. Hall & Co., Boston, Massachusetts. ISBN 0-8057-7429-7 (Paperback).
- Luscher, Robert M. 1993. John Updike: A Study of the Short Fiction. Twayne Publishers, New York. ISBN 0-8057-0850-2
- Macnaughton, William R. 1982. Critical Essays on John Updike. G. K. Hall & Co., Boston, Massachusetts. ISBN 0-8186-8467-4
- Oates, Joyce Carol. 1975. Updike's American Comedies from Modern Fiction Studies 21, Fall 1975, Purdue Research Foundation, in John Updike: Modern Critical Views, Harold Bloom, editor. pp. 57–68 ISBN 0-87754-717-3
- Olster, Stacey. 2006. The Cambridge Companion to John Updike. Cambridge University Press, Cambridge. ISBN 0-521-60730-2 (paperback)
- Tanner, Tony. 1972. Review of Museum and Women and Other Stories from The New York Times Review of Books, 22 October 1972 in Critical Essays on John Updike. G. K. Hall & Co. (1982), William R. Macnaughton editor. pp. 71–75. ISBN 0-8186-8467-4
