= Too Far to Go =

1979 short story collection by John Updike

Too Far to Go: The Maples Stories
- First edition
- Author: John Updike
- Language: English
- Publisher: Fawcett Publications
- Publication date: 1979
- Publication place: United States
- Media type: Print (paperback)
- Pages: 256
- ISBN: 978-0-449-24002-1
- OCLC: 4725109
- Dewey Decimal: 813/.54 19
- LC Class: PS3571.P4 T66

Too Far to Go: The Maples Stories is a collection of 17 short stories by John Updike, published by Fawcett Publications in 1979. Most of the stories first appeared in The New Yorker.

The stories comprise the saga of Richard and Joan Maple, a middle-class couple living in New York City and New England in the 1950s and 60s.

== Stories ==
Unless otherwise indicated, all the stories first appeared in The New Yorker.

- "Snowing in Greenwich Village" (January 13, 1956)
- "Wife-wooing" (March 12, 1960)
- "Giving Blood" (March 29, 1963)
- "Twin Beds in Rome" (January 31, 1964)
- "Marching Through Boston" (January 22, 1966)
- "The Taste of Metal" (March 3, 1967)
- "Your Lover Just Called" (Harper's Magazine, January 1967)
- "Waiting Up" (Weekend)
- "Eros Rampant" (Harper's Magazine, June 1968)
- "Plumbing" (February 12, 1971)
- "The Red-Herring Theory" (The New York Times Sunday Magazine)
- "Sublimating" (Harper's Magazine, September 1971)
- "Nakedness" (The Atlantic Monthly, August 1974)
- "Separating" (June 15, 1975)
- "Gesturing" (Playboy Magazine, January 1979)
- "Divorcing: A Fragment" (Harper's Magazine, January 1967)
- "Here Come the Maples" (October 3, 1976)

== Critical assessment ==
Literary critic Jane Barnes places the Maple stories as among the most accomplished of Updike's literary career:

"Too Far to Go collects all the Maple stories, the first of which was written in 1956. None of them suffers from the stylistic excesses that mark other stories —as if the Maple series were the best stories from any given stage in Updike's developing perception...Updike has written many stories about the insight of that stage, but the Maple stories represent his most polished statement."

Barnes continues: "Because of the purity and sureness of the writing, the Maple stories are a clear medium for the narrator's moral dilemma. The medium is rendered clearer still by the fact that the Maples' experience is considered all by itself, in terms of Richard and Joan and their children.

Literary critic Richard Detwieler considers the central theme of the volume "the dissolution of a marriage and the varieties of attendant suffering."

== Adaptations ==
Too Far To Go: The Maples Stories was adapted as a two-hour television film directed by Fielder Cook. Entitled Too Far to Go, it stars Blythe Danner, Michael Moriarty, Kathryn Walker and Glenn Close, and aired on NBC on March 12, 1979. The linked stories focus upon the marriage and eventual divorce of Richard and Joan Maple and depict a 1960s New York City and New England milieu through the 1970s typical of much of Updike's fiction. Many of the stories were initially published as occasional stories in The New Yorker from the mid-1950s to the mid-1970s.

Literary critic Richard Detweiler writes: "The television dramatization of Too Far To Go, produced in 1979 (with Blythe Danner and Michael Moriarty playing Joan and Richard Maple), was a popular and critical triumph which demonstrated how good television, at times, can be.

The story "Your Lover Just Called" was later adapted into a playlet by Updike himself. It is included in his collection More Matter (1999). Most of these stories were also included in Updike's 2003 collection The Early Stories, except those published after 1975; namely, "Waiting Up", "The Red-Herring Theory", "Divorcing: A Fragment", and "Here Come the Maples". In August 2009, Everyman's Library published The Maples Stories, a new edition of Too Far to Go, including the final Maples story "Grandparenting".

== Sources ==
- Barnes, Jane. 1981. John Updike: A Literary Spider from Virginia Quarterly Review 57 no. 1 (Winter 1981) in John Updike: Modern Critical Views, Harold Bloom, editor. pp. 111–125 ISBN 0-87754-717-3
- Carduff, Christopher. 2013. Ref. 1 Note on the Texts in John Updike: Collected Early Stories. Christopher Carduff, editor. The Library of America. pp. 910–924 ISBN 978-1-59853-251-7
- Detweiler, Robert. 1984. John Updike. Twayne Publishers, G. K. Hall & Co., Boston, Massachusetts. ISBN 0-8057-7429-7 (Paperback).
- Olster, Stacey. 2006. The Cambridge Companion to John Updike. Cambridge University Press, Cambridge. ISBN 0-521-60730-2 (paperback)
