= This Sorry Scheme =

Book by Bruce Marshall

- Author: Bruce Marshall
- Language: English
- Publication date: 1924

This Sorry Scheme is a 1924 novel by Scottish writer Bruce Marshall.
