= A Thread of Scarlet =

Book by Bruce Marshall

- First edition (UK)
- Author: Bruce Marshall
- Publisher: Collins
- Publication date: 1959
- Publication place: Scotland
- Media type: Print (hardback)
- Pages: 256

A Thread of Scarlet (also known as Satan and Cardinal Campbell) is a 1959 novel by Scottish writer Bruce Marshall.

== Plot summary ==
The hero, as often in Marshall's novels, is a Scottish priest. The novel tracks the life of Father Campbell, a convert to Catholicism from a wealthy family, from his ordination to the priesthood just before the First World War until his death many years later, as a Cardinal.

In his first parish assignment, Father Campbell found himself pitted against his Rector, a canon, in a kind of running conflict the first of a series of minor entanglements and setbacks which lay in the path of his vocation like boulders.

World War I sees him sent to France with the British Expeditionary Force as a Chaplain. The experiences there hardened him some, but his essential faith is unshaken. After the war he returns to his parish, still a very serious, but unsophisticated young priest. He seeks a miracle for an Army companion who he has helped lead back to the faith. They go to Lourdes. Scotland, which had never been granted such a miracle, watched hopefully. The outcome was a surprise to everyone, and causes Father Campbell a good deal of bother.

Father Campbell was patient and humble; but in his early years his essential characteristic was a rebellious intelligence, challenged by Catholic discipline and eventually mellowed by the experiences which befell him after he had been created Cardinal.

A study of the complex problems facing the world and the church, the book presents a dramatic and absorbing reality to subjects the layman rarely sees and often feels kept from. The priest's rise through the church hierarchy allows him to travel widely and as he observes the actions of the people, both lay and clerical, he himself remains unspotted by the world. A famous writer has said that only the truly good can understand evil and Father Campbell is a man for whom the glory of God and the truth of the Church are the ultimate realities.

First US edition (publ. Houghton Mifflin)

The result is a heart-warmingly human story of richness and depth in which faith and intelligence triumph – as does charity. The story ends when the old Canon, having grown fond of the Cardinal, relents at last, bequeaths his excellent wine cellar, and his collection of soap scraps, to him.
