= Bruce Marshall (writer) =

Scottish writer (1899–1987)

- Dustjacket photo from Vespers in Vienna (1947)
- Born: 24 June 1899; Edinburgh, Scotland
- Died: 18 June 1987 (aged 87); Biot, France
- Occupations: Novelist and accountant

Lieutenant-Colonel Claude Cunningham Bruce Marshall (24 June 1899 – 18 June 1987) was a prolific Scottish writer who wrote fiction and non-fiction books on a wide range of topics and genres. His first book, A Thief in the Night, came out in 1918, possibly self-published. His last, An Account of Capers, was published posthumously in 1988, a span of 70 years. During his life, he was already translated to nine languages, with several works adapted for theatre and film.

== Life and work ==
Marshall was born in Edinburgh, Scotland, the son of Claude Niven Marshall and Annie Margaret (Bruce) Marshall. He was educated at St. Andrews. He became a Roman Catholic in 1917 and remained active and interested in the faith for the rest of his life. He was a member and at times served as an officer in the Una Voce and the Latin Mass Society organisations.

During World War I he initially served as a private in the Highland Light Infantry. He was commissioned as a second lieutenant into the Royal Irish Fusiliers in 1918 and was then moved to The 34th County of London Battalion. Six days before the 1918 Armistice he was seriously wounded at Bruyelles in France. Courageous German medical orderlies risked intense shelling to rescue him and he was taken prisoner. His injuries resulted in the amputation of one leg. He was promoted to lieutenant in 1919 and invalided out in 1920.

After the war he completed his education in Scotland, graduating with a Bachelor of Commerce from the University of Edinburgh in 1925 before becoming an auditor, and moved to France where he worked in the Paris branch of Peat Marwick Mitchell.

In 1928 he married Mary Pearson Clark (1908–1987). They had one daughter—Sheila Elizabeth Bruce Marshall. In 2009, his granddaughter, Leslie Ferrar, was Treasurer to the Prince of Wales.

He was living in Paris during the 1940 Invasion of France and escaped two days before the Nazis occupied the city. Returning to England he rejoined the military, initially serving in the Royal Army Pay Corps as a lieutenant. He was promoted to captain in Intelligence, assisting the French underground, and then was a lieutenant-colonel in the Displaced Persons Division in Austria. He transferred to the General List in 1945, and left the Army as a lieutenant-colonel in 1946.

After the war Marshall returned to France, moving to the Côte d'Azur and living there for the remainder of his life. He died in Biot, France, six days before his 88th birthday.

== Writing career ==
A Roman Catholic convert, Marshall wrote stories that are usually humorous, paradoxical and mildly satiric and typically have religious overtones. Important themes which run through his works are Catholicism, accounting, a Scottish heritage and war, adventure and intrigue. Often major characters are accountants or Catholic priests. Characters in his novels are often fond of animals and concerned about their treatment. Contempt for modern art and literature is often expressed, often critising detraditionalization of the society and culture.

Marshall's first literary work was a collection of short stories entitled A Thief in the Night published while he was still a student at St. Andrews University. His first novel, This Sorry Scheme, was published in 1924. A stream of novels soon followed, but none of the fiction he wrote before the Second World War gained as much notoriety or staying power as Father Malachy's Miracle (1931).

After the Second World War Marshall became a writer full-time, giving up his work as an accountant.

As to his dual career as an accountant and writer, Marshall once said, "I am an accountant who writes books. In accounting circles I am hailed as a great writer. Among novelists I am assumed to be a competent accountant."

Among his better known works after the Second World War is The White Rabbit (1953), a biography of Wing Commander F. F. E. Yeo-Thomas, describing his exploits and sufferings as a Special Operations Executive military adviser assigned to the French resistance during World War II.

In 1959 he was awarded the Włodzimierz Pietrzak prize.

The theme of much of Marshall's works is religion, with a focus on Roman Catholicism. His first great success, Father Malachy's Miracle, is about an innocent Scottish priest whose encounter with sinful behaviour causes him to become involved in a miracle. A number of his later novels also deal with clergy who are faced with temptation but manage to triumph in a modest and humble manner (e.g., The World, the Flesh, and Father Smith (AKA All Glorious Within) (1944), A Thread of Scarlet (AKA Satan and Cardinal Campbell) (1959), Father Hilary's Holiday (1965), The Month of the Falling Leaves (1963)). Other books centered on religious issues after the Second Vatican Council, dealt increasingly with the internal conflict between Traditionalist Catholicism and Modernism in the Catholic Church, such as The Bishop (1970), Peter the Second (1976), Urban the Ninth (1973) and Marx the First (1975).

Like many expatriates, Marshall expressed great love for his homeland. Most of his books were either set in Great Britain and/or have main characters of British nationality. The work which best shows Marshall's affection for Scotland may be The Black Oxen (1972), which Marshall billed as a Scottish national epic.

Several of Marshall's books have themes about espionage and intrigue, such as Luckypenny (1937), A Girl from Lübeck (1962), The Month of the Falling Leaves (1963), Operation Iscariot (1974), An Account of Capers (1988), The Accounting (AKA The Bank Audit) (1958), and Only Fade Away (1954).

Some of his novels feature major characters who, like Marshall himself, have suffered the loss of a limb. Often major characters from one novel appear in minor roles in other novels.

Marshall was relatively popular in his time. His books were reviewed in major publications on both sides of the Atlantic. At least two of his books were Book of the Month Club selections; Vespers in Vienna (1947) and The World, the Flesh, and Father Smith (AKA All Glorious Within) (1944), in June 1945. An Armed Services Edition of The World, the Flesh, and Father Smith was also produced.

His books were published in at least nine languages — English, Dutch, French, German, Italian, Polish, Czech, Portuguese and Spanish. Father Malachy's Miracle was translated and published in Croatian in 2023.

== Film, stage and television adaptations ==
His 1931 novel Father Malachy's Miracle was adapted for the stage in 1938 by Brian Doherty. The novel was adapted for presentation on The Ford Theatre Hour, an American TV show, in 1950. In 1961, the novel was the basis for the German film Das Wunder des Malachias directed by Bernhard Wicki and starring Horst Bollmann, Richard Münch and Christiane Nielsen.

His 1947 novel Vespers in Vienna, a highly critical depiction of the British military role in Operation Keelhaul, was the basis of the 1949 film The Red Danube starring Walter Pidgeon, Ethel Barrymore, Peter Lawford, Angela Lansbury and Janet Leigh. George Sidney directed. After the movie's release the novel was re-issued under the title The Red Danube.

His 1953 novel The Fair Bride was the basis of the 1960 film The Angel Wore Red starring Ava Gardner, Dirk Bogarde, Joseph Cotten and Vittorio De Sica. It was the last film directed by Nunnally Johnson.

His 1952 book, The White Rabbit, recounting the World War II exploits of Special Operations Executive agent F. F. E. Yeo-Thomas, was made into a TV mini-series in 1967.

His 1963 novel The Month of the Falling Leaves was the basis of the 1968 German TV show Der Monat der fallenden Blätter. Marshall co-wrote the screenplay with Herbert Asmodi. It was directed by Dietrich Haugk.
