= Ernst Misselwitz =

SS Officer and War criminal

- Born: 31 August 1909; Neumünster
- Died: unknown
- Conviction: War crimes
- Penalty: imprisonment 5 years (1952) (in absentia)
- SS service
- Allegiance: Nazi Germany
- Branch: Schutzstaffel
- Rank: SS-Hauptscharführer

Ernst Misselwitz (31 August 1909 –?) was an SS-Hauptscharführer who became head of the unit IV E of the RSHA – Reich Security Main Office of the Gestapo (secret state police) in occupied Paris, France, during World War II. In 1952 he was found guilty of having tortured French Resistance fighters. According to Serge Klarsfeld, French Intelligence employed Misselwitz after the war in helping them investigate Nazi war crimes and preparing court cases against wartime French collaborators.

== Gestapo ==
Ernst Misselwitz arrived in July 1942 rue des Saussaies at the Sicherheitsdienst (SD), the intelligence services of the SS. In January 1943, he joined the Befehlshaber der Sipo-SD (BdS) located at 84 Avenue Foch. The BdS included the Gestapo for which he was in charge of unit IV E of the RSHA, whose remit was French Communists and French Resistance. Karl Bömelburg was his boss as chief of unit IV. As a senior Sicherheitsdienst (SD) officer, he was given freedom of action and autonomy to hunt anyone thought to be anti-Nazi. He became a trusted agent of the SD and led numerous operations against the French Resistance. Misselwitz ran the interrogation and torture chamber in Paris Gestapo HQ. Before working in Paris, Misselwitz worked in Gestapo HQ in Lyon.

On 3–4 July 1943 Jean Moulin was taken to the Gestapo headquarters in Paris where Misselwitz interrogated him along with Klaus Barbie. Jean Moulin officially died of his injuries on July 8, 1943.

Gilberte Brossolette, the widow of the Resistance hero, Pierre Brossolette, testified to Misselwitz' war crimes. In February 1944, Pierre Brossolette was arrested in Rennes. On 16 March, Misselwitz made the trip to identify him as they met in Lyon while Misselwitz was on a mission. He ordered the transfer of Brossolette to avenue Foch on 19 March. Brossolette was interrogated and tortured by Misselwitz and also Robert Krekeller. On 21 March, Forest Yeo-Thomas, an agent of the Special Operations Executive was captured by the Gestapo at the Passy tube station. He was on a mission to rescue Brossolette from the Rennes prison and Misselwitz would interrogate him. Since Brossolette was afraid of talking and betraying his cause under further torture, he jumped out of a sixth-floor window to his death on 22 March.

In May 1944, Jean Moulin's sister went to the Gestapo office in Paris to ask for her brother's ashes. Misselwitz dismissed her.

== French agent ==
With the Liberation of Paris on 25 August 1944, Misselwitz fled from Paris to Germany. In October 1945, the 36-year-old Misselwitz reported to the French security services in northwest Berlin. Misselwitz was arrested and imprisoned for a short time and offered to spy among the inmates, starting in early 1946. In 1952 Misselwitz was convicted in a Paris court In absentia. He was sentenced to five years' imprisonment for the torture of Brossolette, but was never found or arrested. Serge and Beate Klarsfeld discovered that the French secret services employed Ernst Misselwitz beginning in 1945.

The time and place of his death are unknown.

== See also ==
- Pierre Paoli
- Colonel Fabien (in French)
