= List of places named after Pierre Brossolette =

Many places, predominantly in France, have been named after French Resistance leader and hero Pierre Brossolette (1903-1944).

== Summary ==
More than 600 public places can be accounted for bearing the name of Pierre Brossolette, including streets, squares schools, sports facilities, housing developments and other sites. Most of them were inaugurated before 1964, when he was considered to be the most influential leader and the greatest hero of the wartime period. Accessorily, street inaugurations were systematically made, before Jean Moulin's Panthéon enthronement in 1964, according to the official government "tripartite" chart: Henri Honoré d'Estienne d'Orves (representing royalists and by extension the right-wing), Pierre Brossolette (socialists) and Gabriel Péri (communists).

Among these places, most are streets/squares distributed all over France, including overseas counties like La Réunion. The total count nears 500 (at least 490 actually) streets ranging from boulevards to cul-de-sacs, squares and greens, quays and bridges.

Also at least 76 schools, 27 venues (stadia, gyms, community centers), 8 estates/projects and 23 condominia can be counted, adding up to a minimum count of 624 places (not including building and street plaques, steles and monuments).

== Streets and squares ==
=== Detailed list ===
- Rue Pierre Brossolette, 50100, Cherbourg-Octeville, Cherbourg-en-Cotentin
- Rue Pierre Brossolette, 50110, Tourlaville, Cherbourg-en-Cotentin
- Rue Pierre Brossolette, 66350, Toulouges, Arrondissement of Perpignan
- Rue Pierre Brossolette, 66700, Argelès-sur-Mer, Arrondissement of Céret
- Rue Pierre Brossolette, 66160, Le Boulou, Arrondissement of Céret
- Rue Pierre Brossolette, 78350, Jouy-en-Josas, Arrondissement of Versailles
- Rue Pierre Brossolette, 92140, Clamart, Arrondissement of Antony
- Rue Pierre Brossolette / Rue de Châtillon, 92140, Clamart, Arrondissement of Antony
- Rue Pierre Brossolette, 91350, Grigny Municipality, Arrondissement d'Évry
- Rue Pierre Brossolette, 78280, Guyancourt, Arrondissement of Versailles
- Rue Pierre Brossolette, 78220, Viroflay, Arrondissement of Versailles
- Rue Pierre Brossolette, 56270, Plœmeur, Arrondissement of Lorient
- Rue Pierre Brossolette, 78390, Fontenay-le-Fleury, Arrondissement of Versailles
- Avenue Pierre Brossolette, 78340, Les Clayes-sous-Bois, Arrondissement of Versailles
- Allée Pierre Brossolette, 91700, Fleury-Mérogis, Arrondissement d'Évry
- Rue Pierre Brossolette, 91700, Fleury-Mérogis, Arrondissement d'Évry
- Rue Pierre Brossolette, 91700, Sainte-Geneviève-des-Bois Municipality, Arrondissement of Palaiseau
- Rue Pierre Brossolette, 91360, Épinay-sur-Orge, Arrondissement of Palaiseau
- Rue Pierre Brossolette, 91600, Savigny-sur-Orge, Arrondissement of Palaiseau
- Place Pierre Brossolette, 91420, Morangis Municipality, Arrondissement of Palaiseau
- Rue Pierre Brossolette, 31170, Tournefeuille, Arrondissement of Toulouse
- Rue Pierre Brossolette, 51100, Reims, Arrondissement of Reims
- Rue Pierre Brossolette, 51430, Tinqueux, Arrondissement of Reims
- Rue Pierre Brossolette, 26100, Romans-sur-Isère, Arrondissement of Valence
- Rue Pierre Brossolette, 92320, Châtillon Municipality, Arrondissement of Antony
- Rue Pierre Brossolette, 92260, Fontenay-aux-Roses, Arrondissement of Antony
- Rue Pierre Brossolette, 92220, Bagneux Municipality, Arrondissement of Antony
- Avenue Pierre Brossolette, 92240, Malakoff Municipality, Arrondissement of Antony
- Rue Pierre Brossolette, 68200, Mulhouse, Arrondissement of Mulhouse
- Rue Pierre Brossolette, 78190, Trappes, Arrondissement of Versailles
- Avenue Pierre Brossolette, 94100, Le Parc Saint-Maur, Saint-Maur-des-Fossés
- Rue Pierre Brossolette, 54510, Tomblaine, Arrondissement of Nancy
- Rue Pierre Brossolette, 59494, Aubry-du-Hainaut, Arrondissement of Valenciennes
- Rue Pierre Brossolette, 59860, Bruay-sur-l'Escaut, Arrondissement of Valenciennes
- Rue Pierre Brossolette, 59163, Condé-sur-l'Escaut, Arrondissement of Valenciennes
- Rue Pierre Brossolette, 59230, Saint-Amand-les-Eaux, Arrondissement of Valenciennes
- Rue Pierre Brossolette, 59300, Aulnoy-lez-Valenciennes, Arrondissement of Valenciennes
- Rue Pierre Brossolette, 35340, Liffré, Arrondissement of Rennes
- Rue Pierre Brossolette, 11100, Narbonne, Arrondissement of Narbonne
- Rue Pierre Brossolette, 59460, Jeumont, Arrondissement of Avesnes-sur-Helpe
- Rue Pierre Brossolette, 59540, Caudry, Arrondissement of Cambrai
- Rue Pierre Brossolette, 59198, Haspres, Arrondissement of Valenciennes
- Rue Pierre Brossolette, 59554, Neuville-Saint-Rémy, Arrondissement of Cambrai
- Rue Pierre Brossolette, 59252, Marquette-en-Ostrevant, Arrondissement of Valenciennes
- Rue Pierre Brossolette, 59293, Neuville-sur-Escaut, Arrondissement of Valenciennes
- Rue Pierre Brossolette, 59172, Rœulx, Arrondissement of Valenciennes
- Rue Pierre Brossolette, 59450, Sin-le-Noble, Arrondissement of Douai
- Place Pierre Brossolette, 59500, Douai, Arrondissement of Douai
- Rue Pierre Brossolette, 59500, Douai, Arrondissement of Douai
- Rue Pierre Brossolette, 59128, Flers-en-Escrebieux, Arrondissement of Douai
- Rue Pierre Brossolette, 59286, Roost-Warendin, Arrondissement of Douai
- Rue Pierre Brossolette, 59148, Flines-lez-Raches, Arrondissement of Douai
- Boulevard Pierre Brossolette, 92160, Antony, Arrondissement of Antony
- Rue Pierre Brossolette, 59239, Thumeries, Arrondissement of Lille
- Rue Pierre Brossolette, 59162, Ostricourt, Arrondissement of Lille
- Rue Pierre Brossolette, 59830, Cysoing, Arrondissement of Lille
- Rue Pierre Brossolette, 59136, Wavrin, Arrondissement of Lille
- Rue Pierre Brossolette, 59120, Loos, Arrondissement of Lille
- Rue Pierre Brossolette, 59160, Lomme, Lille
- Rue Pierre Brossolette, 59100, Hem, Arrondissement of Lille
- Rue Pierre Brossolette, 59390, Lys-lez-Lannoy, Arrondissement of Lille
- Rue Pierre Brossolette, 59700, Marcq-en-Barœul, Arrondissement of Lille
- Rue Pierre Brossolette, 59290, Wasquehal, Arrondissement of Lille
- Rue Pierre Brossolette, 59100, Roubaix, Arrondissement of Lille
- Rue Pierre Brossolette, 59223, Roncq, Arrondissement of Lille
- Allée Pierre Brossolette, 59250, Halluin, Arrondissement of Lille
- Place Pierre Brossolette, 78360, Le Vésinet, Arrondissement of Saint-Germain-en-Laye
- Rue Pierre Brossolette, 26500, Bourg-lès-Valence, Arrondissement of Valence
- Rue Pierre Brossolette, 59116, Houplines, Arrondissement of Lille
- Avenue Pierre Brossolette, 59280, Armentières, Arrondissement of Lille
- Rue Pierre Brossolette, 34500, Béziers, Arrondissement of Béziers
- Rue Pierre Brossolette, 34760, Boujan-sur-Libron, Arrondissement of Béziers
- Avenue Pierre Brossolette, 13100, Aix-en-Provence, Arrondissement of Aix-en-Provence
- Impasse Pierre Brossolette, 13300, Salon-de-Provence, Arrondissement of Aix-en-Provence
- Rue Pierre Brossolette, 13300, Salon-de-Provence, Arrondissement of Aix-en-Provence
- Rue Pierre Brossolette, 91370, Verrières-le-Buisson, Arrondissement of Palaiseau
- Rue Pierre Brossolette, 13140, Miramas, Arrondissement of Istres
- Avenue Pierre Brossolette, 28500, Vernouillet Municipality, Arrondissement of Dreux
- Boulevard Pierre Brossolette, 13320, Bouc-Bel-Air, Arrondissement of Aix-en-Provence
- Avenue Pierre Brossolette, 13120, Gardanne, Arrondissement of Aix-en-Provence
- Rue Pierre Brossolette, 13700, Marignane, Arrondissement of Istres
- Rue Pierre Brossolette, 95310, Saint-Ouen-l'Aumône, Arrondissement of Pontoise
- Rue Pierre Brossolette, 13200, Arles, Arrondissement of Arles
- Rue Pierre Brossolette, 13160, Châteaurenard, Arrondissement of Arles
- Traverse Pierre Brossolette, 13160, Châteaurenard, Arrondissement of Arles
- Rue Pierre Brossolette, 84300, Cavaillon, Arrondissement of Apt
- Rue Pierre Brossolette, 02600, Villers-Cotterêts, Arrondissement of Soissons
- Rue Pierre Brossolette, 02880, Crouy, Arrondissement of Soissons
- Rue Pierre Brossolette, 13110, Port-de-Bouc, Arrondissement of Istres
- Rue Pierre Brossolette, 13960, Sausset-les-Pins, Arrondissement of Istres
- Rue Pierre Brossolette, 13500, Martigues, Arrondissement of Istres
- Rue Pierre Brossolette, 13220, Châteauneuf-les-Martigues, Arrondissement of Istres
- Avenue Pierre Brossolette, 13400, Aubagne, Arrondissement of Marseille
- Rue Pierre Brossolette, 11100, Montredon-des-Corbières, Arrondissement of Narbonne
- Rue Pierre Brossolette, 90000, Belfort, Territoire-de-Belfort
- Rue Pierre Brossolette, 30100, Alès, Arrondissement of Alès
- Rue Pierre Brossolette, 40160, Parentis-en-Born, Arrondissement of Mont-de-Marsan
- Rue Pierre Brossolette, 95600, Eaubonne, Arrondissement of Argenteuil
- Avenue Pierre Brossolette, 83160, La Valette-du-Var, Arrondissement of Toulon
- Rue Pierre Brossolette, 11620, Villemoustaussou, Arrondissement of Carcassonne
- Avenue Pierre Brossolette, 11700, Pépieux, Arrondissement of Carcassonne
- Impasse Pierre Brossolette, 11700, Pépieux, Arrondissement of Carcassonne
- Allée Pierre Brossolette, 59190, Hazebrouck, Arrondissement of Dunkirk
- Avenue Pierre Brossolette, 11560, Fleury Municipality, Arrondissement of Narbonne
- Rue Pierre Brossolette, 77410, Claye-Souilly, Arrondissement of Meaux
- Rue Pierre Brossolette, 94240, L'Haÿ-les-Roses, Arrondissement de L'Haÿ-les-Roses
- Rue Pierre Brossolette, 77380, Combs-la-Ville, Arrondissement of Melun
- Rue Pierre Brossolette, 16000, Angoulême, Arrondissement of Angoulême
- Passage Pierre Brossolette, 77100, Meaux, Arrondissement of Meaux
- Rue Pierre Brossolette, 92300, Levallois-Perret, Arrondissement of Arrondissement of Nanterre
- Rue Pierre Brossolette, 33310, Lormont, Arrondissement of Bordeaux
- Rue Pierre Brossolette, 33270, Floirac Municipality, Arrondissement of Bordeaux
- Rue Pierre Brossolette, 38530, Pontcharra, Arrondissement of Grenoble
- Rue Pierre Brossolette, 92390, Villeneuve-la-Garenne, Arrondissement of Arrondissement of Nanterre
- Rue Pierre Brossolette, 92700, Colombes, Arrondissement of Arrondissement of Nanterre
- Rue Pierre Brossolette, 92400, La Garenne-Colombes, Arrondissement of Arrondissement of Nanterre
- Rue Pierre Brossolette, 76300, Sotteville-lès-Rouen, Arrondissement of Rouen
- Rue Pierre Brossolette, 76140, Le Petit-Quevilly, Arrondissement of Rouen
- Rue Pierre Brossolette, 62500, Saint-Martin-au-Laërt, Saint-Martin-lez-Tatinghem
- Rue Pierre Brossolette, 62219, Longuenesse, Arrondissement of Saint-Omer
- Rue Pierre Brossolette, 62510, Arques Municipality, Arrondissement of Saint-Omer
- Rue Pierre Brossolette, 13800, Istres, Arrondissement of Istres
- Rue Pierre Brossolette, 33230, Coutras, Arrondissement of Libourne
- Rue du Colonel Pierre Brossolette, 94290, Villeneuve-le-Roi, Arrondissement de L'Haÿ-les-Roses
- Allée Pierre Brossolette, 76380, Canteleu, Arrondissement of Rouen
- Rue Pierre Brossolette, 76650, Petit-Couronne, Arrondissement of Rouen
- Rue Pierre Brossolette, 95210, Saint-Gratien Municipality, Arrondissement of Sarcelles
- Rue Pierre Brossolette, 94110, Arcueil, Arrondissement de L'Haÿ-les-Roses
- Rue Pierre Brossolette, 76600, Le Havre, Arrondissement of Le Havre
- Rue du Colonel Pierre Brossolette, 94480, Ablon-sur-Seine, Arrondissement de L'Haÿ-les-Roses
- Rue Pierre Brossolette, 33130, Bègles, Arrondissement of Bordeaux
- Avenue Pierre Brossolette, 33110, Le Bouscat, Arrondissement of Bordeaux
- Boulevard Pierre Brossolette, 72100, Le Mans, Arrondissement of Le Mans
- Chemin Pierre Brossolette, 84160, Cadenet, Arrondissement of Apt
- Rue Pierre Brossolette, 94880, Noiseau, Arrondissement of Créteil
- Rue Pierre Brossolette, 94350, Villiers-sur-Marne, Arrondissement of Nogent-sur-Marne
- Avenue Georges Clemenceau - Rue Pierre Brossolette, 94360, Bry-sur-Marne, Arrondissement of Nogent-sur-Marne
- Rue Pierre Brossolette, 94360, Bry-sur-Marne, Arrondissement of Nogent-sur-Marne
- Avenue Pierre Brossolette, 94170, Le Perreux-sur-Marne, Arrondissement of Nogent-sur-Marne
- Rue Pierre Brossolette, 03100, Montluçon, Arrondissement of Montluçon
- Rue Pierre Brossolette, 63200, Riom, Arrondissement of Riom
- Rue Pierre Brossolette, 56700, Hennebont, Arrondissement of Lorient
- Allée Pierre Brossolette, 54700, Pont-à-Mousson, Arrondissement of Nancy
- Rond-Point Pierre Brossolette, 73800, Montmélian, Arrondissement of Chambéry
- Rue Pierre Brossolette, 76770, Malaunay, Arrondissement of Rouen
- Rue Pierre Brossolette, 87000, Limoges, Arrondissement of Limoges
- Rue Pierre Brossolette, 80100, Abbeville, Arrondissement of Abbeville
- Rue Pierre Brossolette, 80330, Longueau, Arrondissement of Amiens
- Rue Pierre Brossolette, 80700, Roye Municipality, Arrondissement of Montdidier
- Rue Pierre Brossolette, 80800, Corbie, Arrondissement of Amiens
- Rue Pierre Brossolette, 56440, Languidic, Arrondissement of Lorient
- Route Pierre Brossolette, 87240, Ambazac, Arrondissement of Limoges
- Rue Pierre Brossolette, 95150, Taverny, Arrondissement of Argenteuil
- Rue Pierre Brossolette, 87410, Le Palais-sur-Vienne, Arrondissement of Limoges
- Rue Pierre Brossolette, 12700, Capdenac-Gare, Arrondissement of Villefranche-de-Rouergue
- Rue Pierre Brossolette, 87350, Panazol, Arrondissement of Limoges
- Rue Pierre Brossolette, 42100, Saint-Étienne, Arrondissement of Saint-Étienne
- Rue Pierre Brossolette, 23000, Guéret, Arrondissement of Guéret
- Rue Pierre Brossolette, 31240, Saint-Jean Municipality, Arrondissement of Toulouse
- Allée Pierre Brossolette, 19100, Brive-la-Gaillarde, Arrondissement of Brive-la-Gaillarde
- Boulevard Pierre Brossolette, 19100, Brive-la-Gaillarde, Arrondissement of Brive-la-Gaillarde
- Impasse Pierre Brossolette, 42150, La Ricamarie, Arrondissement of Saint-Étienne
- Rue Pierre Brossolette, 69330, Meyzieu, Arrondissement of Lyon
- Avenue Pierre Brossolette, 31600, Seysses, Arrondissement of Muret
- Avenue Pierre Brossolette, 07700, Bourg-Saint-Andéol, Arrondissement of Privas
- Rue Pierre Brossolette, 69960, Corbas, Arrondissement of Lyon
- Rue Pierre Brossolette, 46300, Gourdon Municipality, Arrondissement of Gourdon
- Rue Pierre Brossolette, 36100, Issoudun, Arrondissement of Issoudun
- Rue Pierre Brossolette, 07500, Guilherand-Granges, Arrondissement of Tournon-sur-Rhône
- Rue Pierre Brossolette, 32000, Auch, Arrondissement of Auch
- Rue Pierre Brossolette, 73300, Saint-Jean-de-Maurienne, Arrondissement of Saint-Jean-de-Maurienne
- Place Pierre Brossolette, 93260, Les Lilas, Arrondissement of Bobigny
- Rue Pierre Brossolette, 93110, Rosny-sous-Bois, Arrondissement of Le Raincy
- Rue Pierre Brossolette, 76500, Elbeuf, Arrondissement of Rouen
- Rue Pierre Brossolette, 42153, Riorges, Arrondissement of Roanne
- Rue Pierre Brossolette, 42300, Roanne, Arrondissement of Roanne
- Rue Pierre Brossolette, 93360, Neuilly-Plaisance, Arrondissement of Le Raincy
- Rond-Point Pierre Brossolette, 86100, Châtellerault, Arrondissement of Châtellerault
- Rue Pierre Brossolette, 63800, Cournon-d'Auvergne, Arrondissement of Clermont-Ferrand
- Rue Pierre Brossolette, 76320, Caudebec-lès-Elbeuf, Arrondissement of Rouen
- Rue Pierre Brossolette, 82000, Montauban, Arrondissement of Montauban
- Rue Pierre Brossolette, 63540, Romagnat, Arrondissement of Clermont-Ferrand
- Rue Pierre Brossolette, 95270, Asnières-sur-Oise, Arrondissement of Sarcelles
- Rue Pierre Brossolette, 95470, Fosses, Arrondissement of Sarcelles
- Avenue Pierre Brossolette, 95500, Gonesse, Arrondissement of Sarcelles
- Rue Pierre Brossolette, 95130, Le Plessis-Bouchard, Arrondissement of Argenteuil
- Rue Pierre Brossolette, 60180, Nogent-sur-Oise, Arrondissement of Senlis
- Allée Pierre Brossolette, 47000, Agen, Arrondissement of Agen
- Rue Pierre Brossolette, 44480, Donges, Arrondissement of Saint-Nazaire
- Rue Pierre Brossolette, 45140, Saint-Jean-de-la-Ruelle, Arrondissement of Orléans
- Rue Pierre Brossolette, 44260, Malville, Arrondissement of Saint-Nazaire
- Avenue Pierre Brossolette, 91100, Corbeil-Essonnes, Arrondissement d'Évry
- Rue Pierre Brossolette, 91130, Ris-Orangis, Arrondissement d'Évry
- Rue Pierre Brossolette, 91270, Vigneux-sur-Seine, Arrondissement d'Évry
- Rue Pierre Brossolette, 02430, Gauchy, Arrondissement of Saint-Quentin
- Rue Pierre Brossolette, 02420, Nauroy, Arrondissement of Saint-Quentin
- Rue Pierre Brossolette, 02100, Saint-Quentin, Arrondissement of Saint-Quentin
- Rue Pierre Brossolette, 08000, Charleville-Mézières, Arrondissement of Charleville-Mézières
- Rue Pierre Brossolette, 79400, Saint-Maixent-l'École, Arrondissement of Niort
- Impasse Pierre Brossolette, 31320, Castanet-Tolosan, Arrondissement of Toulouse
- Rue Pierre Brossolette, 31140, Montberon, Arrondissement of Toulouse
- Avenue Pierre Brossolette, 93380, Pierrefitte-sur-Seine, Arrondissement of Saint-Denis
- Impasse Pierre Brossolette, 31700, Cornebarrieu, Arrondissement of Toulouse
- Rue Pierre Brossolette, 31700, Cornebarrieu, Arrondissement of Toulouse
- Rue Pierre Brossolette, 31830, Plaisance-du-Touch, Arrondissement of Toulouse
- Rue Pierre Brossolette, 31120, Portet-sur-Garonne, Arrondissement of Muret
- Allée Pierre Brossolette, 58600, Garchizy, Arrondissement of Nevers
- Rue Pierre Brossolette, 58600, Garchizy, Arrondissement of Nevers
- Rue Pierre Brossolette, 93290, Tremblay-en-France, Arrondissement of Le Raincy
- Rue Pierre Brossolette, 65600, Séméac, Arrondissement of Tarbes
- Rue Pierre Brossolette, 58640, Varennes-Vauzelles, Arrondissement of Nevers
- Avenue Pierre Brossolette, 93150, Le Blanc-Mesnil, Arrondissement of Le Raincy
- Avenue Pierre Brossolette, 93420, Villepinte Municipality, Arrondissement of Le Raincy
- Allée Pierre Brossolette, 93320, Les Pavillons-sous-Bois, Arrondissement of Le Raincy
- Avenue Pierre Brossolette, 69500, Bron, Arrondissement of Lyon
- Rue Pierre Brossolette, 85000, La Roche-sur-Yon, Arrondissement of La Roche-sur-Yon
- Rue Pierre Brossolette, 64150, Mourenx, Arrondissement of Pau
- Rue Pierre Brossolette, 62575, Blendecques, Arrondissement of Saint-Omer
- Rue Pierre Brossolette, 62590, Oignies, Arrondissement of Lens
- Rue Pierre Brossolette, 62790, Leforest, Arrondissement of Lens
- Rue Pierre Brossolette, 62410, Wingles, Arrondissement of Lens
- Rue Pierre Brossolette, 62240, Desvres, Arrondissement of Boulogne-sur-Mer
- Rue Pierre Brossolette, 30240, Le Grau-du-Roi, Arrondissement of Nîmes
- Rue Pierre Brossolette, 44600, Saint-Nazaire Municipality, Arrondissement of Saint-Nazaire
- Rue Pierre Brossolette, 38140, Rives Municipality, Arrondissement of Grenoble
- Avenue Pierre Brossolette, 84110, Vaison-la-Romaine, Arrondissement of Carpentras
- Rue Pierre Brossolette, 95200, Sarcelles, Arrondissement of Sarcelles
- Rue Pierre Brossolette, 62480, Le Portel, Arrondissement of Boulogne-sur-Mer
- Rue Pierre Brossolette, 82300, Caussade, Arrondissement of Montauban
- Impasse Pierre Brossolette, 34440, Nissan-lez-Enserune, Arrondissement of Béziers
- Square Pierre Brossolette, 34410, Sérignan, Arrondissement of Béziers
- Rue Pierre Brossolette, 34450, Vias, Arrondissement of Béziers
- Rue Pierre Brossolette, 34200, Sète, Arrondissement of Montpellier
- Rue Pierre Brossolette, 34110, Frontignan, Arrondissement of Montpellier
- Rue Pierre Brossolette, 28400, Nogent-le-Rotrou, Arrondissement of Nogent-le-Rotrou
- Rue Pierre Brossolette, 28300, Mainvilliers, Arrondissement of Chartres
- Rue Pierre Brossolette, 34230, Paulhan, Arrondissement of Lodève
- Rue Pierre Brossolette, 34130, Mauguio, Arrondissement of Montpellier
- Rue Pierre Brossolette, 34590, Marsillargues, Arrondissement of Montpellier
- Rue Pierre Brossolette, 62100, Calais, Arrondissement of Calais
- Rue Pierre Brossolette, 29600, Saint-Martin-des-Champs Municipality, Arrondissement of Morlaix
- Rue Pierre Brossolette, 11700, Puichéric, Arrondissement of Carcassonne
- Impasse Pierre Brossolette, 29100, Douarnenez, Arrondissement of Quimper
- Place Pierre Brossolette, 91480, Quincy-sous-Sénart, Arrondissement d'Évry
- Rue Pierre Brossolette, 78440, Gargenville, Arrondissement of Mantes-la-Jolie
- Avenue Pierre Brossolette, 04800, Gréoux-les-Bains, Arrondissement of Forcalquier
- Rue Pierre Brossolette, 78520, Limay, Arrondissement of Mantes-la-Jolie
- Rue Pierre Brossolette, 78711, Mantes-la-Ville, Arrondissement of Mantes-la-Jolie
- Rue Pierre Brossolette, 83400, Hyères, Arrondissement of Toulon
- Rue Pierre Brossolette, 30490, Montfrin, Arrondissement of Nîmes
- Rue Pierre Brossolette, 18130, Dun-sur-Auron, Arrondissement of Saint-Amand-Montrond
- Rue Pierre Brossolette, 32330, Lauraët, Arrondissement of Condom
- Rue Pierre Brossolette, 53100, Mayenne, Arrondissement of Mayenne
- Avenue Pierre Brossolette, 91380, Chilly-Mazarin, Arrondissement of Palaiseau
- Rue Pierre Brossolette, 33200, Caudéran, Bordeaux
- Allée Pierre Brossolette, 77200, Torcy Municipality, Arrondissement of Torcy
- Avenue Pierre Brossolette, 77330, Ozoir-la-Ferrière, Arrondissement of Torcy
- Avenue Pierre Brossolette, 95250, Beauchamp, Arrondissement of Argenteuil
- Rue Pierre Brossolette, 22700, Perros-Guirec, Arrondissement of Lannion
- Rue Pierre Brossolette, 77160, Poigny, Arrondissement of Provins
- Avenue Pierre Brossolette, 78380, Bougival, Arrondissement of Versailles
- Avenue Pierre Brossolette, 10000, Troyes, Arrondissement of Troyes
- Rue Pierre Brossolette, 10300, Sainte-Savine, Arrondissement of Troyes
- Avenue Pierre Brossolette, 51000, Châlons-en-Champagne, Arrondissement of Châlons-en-Champagne
- Rue Pierre Brossolette, 91210, Draveil, Arrondissement d'Évry
- Rond-Point Pierre Brossolette, 78130, Les Mureaux, Arrondissement of Mantes-la-Jolie
- Rue Pierre Brossolette, 78130, Les Mureaux, Arrondissement of Mantes-la-Jolie
- Avenue Pierre Brossolette, 91170, Quartier Centre Ville, Viry-Châtillon
- Impasse Pierre Brossolette, 91170, Quartier Centre Ville, Viry-Châtillon
- Rue Pierre Brossolette, 95140, Garges-lès-Gonesse, Arrondissement of Sarcelles
- Avenue Pierre Brossolette, 95400, Arnouville, Arrondissement of Sarcelles
- Rue Pierre Brossolette, 60110, Méru, Arrondissement of Beauvais
- Allée Pierre Brossolette, 95400, Villiers-le-Bel, Arrondissement of Sarcelles
- Rue Pierre Brossolette, 95340, Persan, Arrondissement of Pontoise
- Rue Pierre Brossolette, 27340, Pont-de-l'Arche, Arrondissement of Les Andelys
- Rue Pierre Brossolette, 27000, Évreux, Arrondissement of Évreux
- Rue Pierre Brossolette, 29800, Landerneau, Arrondissement of Brest
- Rue Pierre Brossolette, 27930, Gravigny, Arrondissement of Évreux
- Rue Pierre Brossolette, 95260, Beaumont-sur-Oise, Arrondissement of Pontoise
- Rue Pierre Brossolette, 95590, Presles Municipality, Arrondissement of Pontoise
- Boulevard Pierre Brossolette, 78230, Le Pecq, Arrondissement of Saint-Germain-en-Laye
- Rue Pierre Brossolette, 71410, Sanvignes-les-Mines, Arrondissement of Autun
- Avenue Pierre Brossolette, 27800, Brionne, Arrondissement of Bernay
- Impasse Pierre Brossolette, 27800, Brionne, Arrondissement of Bernay
- Impasse Pierre Brossolette, 11120, Argeliers, Arrondissement of Narbonne
- Rue Pierre Brossolette, 02320, Anizy-le-Château, Anizy-le-Grand
- Rue Pierre Brossolette, 83210, Solliès-Pont, Arrondissement of Toulon
- Rue Pierre-Brossolette, 62880, Annay Municipality, Arrondissement of Lens
- Rue Pierre Brossolette, 62160, Bully-les-Mines, Arrondissement of Lens
- Rue Pierre Brossolette, 62300, Éleu-dit-Leauwette, Arrondissement of Lens
- Rue Pierre Brossolette, 62150, Houdain, Arrondissement of Béthune
- Rue Pierre-Brossolette, 71160, Digoin, Arrondissement of Charolles
- Rue Pierre Brossolette, 62300, Lens, Arrondissement of Lens
- Rue Pierre Brossolette, 62640, Montigny-en-Gohelle, Arrondissement of Lens
- Rue Pierre Brossolette, 62290, Nœux-les-Mines, Arrondissement of Béthune
- Rue Pierre Brossolette, 62880, Vendin-le-Vieil, Arrondissement of Lens
- Rue Pierre Brossolette, 62130, Saint-Pol-sur-Ternoise, Arrondissement of Arras
- Rue Pierre Brossolette, 80390, Fressenneville, Arrondissement of Abbeville
- Rue Pierre Brossolette, 94350, Centre Ville, Villiers-sur-Marne
- Rue Pierre Brossolette, 94350, Les Stades, Villiers-sur-Marne
- Rue Pierre Brossolette, 80470, Saint-Sauveur Municipality, Arrondissement of Amiens
- Rue Pierre Brossolette, 80470, Ailly-sur-Somme, Arrondissement of Amiens
- Rue Pierre Brossolette, 80470, Breilly, Arrondissement of Amiens
- Rue Pierre Brossolette, 77130, Montereau-Fault-Yonne, Arrondissement of Provins
- Allée Pierre Brossolette, 77370, Nangis, Arrondissement of Provins
- Rue Pierre Brossolette, 29270, Carhaix-Plouguer, Arrondissement of Châteaulin
- Impasse Pierre Brossolette, 31190, Miremont Municipality, Arrondissement of Muret
- Avenue Pierre Brossolette, 92240, Arrondissement of Antony, Hauts-de-Seine
- Rue Pierre Brossolette, 81400, Blaye-les-Mines, Arrondissement of Albi
- Avenue Pierre Brossolette, 94500, Le Tremblay, Champigny-sur-Marne
- Rue Pierre Brossolette, 28170, Châteauneuf-en-Thymerais, Arrondissement of Dreux
- Rue Pierre Brossolette, 24150, Lalinde, Arrondissement of Bergerac
- Passage Pierre Brossolette, 28200, Châteaudun, Arrondissement of Châteaudun
- Rue Pierre Brossolette, 28200, Châteaudun, Arrondissement of Châteaudun
- Impasse du 9 Pierre Brossolette, 33920, Saint-Yzan-de-Soudiac, Arrondissement of Blaye
- Rue Pierre Brossolette, 33920, Saint-Yzan-de-Soudiac, Arrondissement of Blaye
- Rue Pierre Brossolette, 51260, Saint-Just-Sauvage, Arrondissement of Épernay
- Rue Pierre Brossolette, 24200, Sarlat-la-Canéda, Arrondissement of Sarlat-la-Canéda
- Rue Pierre Brossolette, 94120, Bois - Clos d'Orléans, Fontenay-sous-Bois
- Avenue Pierre Brossolette, 24120, Terrasson-Lavilledieu, Arrondissement of Sarlat-la-Canéda
- Rue Pierre Brossolette, 54110, Varangéville, Arrondissement of Nancy
- Rue Pierre Brossolette, 80110, Moreuil, Arrondissement of Montdidier
- Rue Pierre Brossolette, 31400, Pont des Demoiselles, Montaudran, La Terrasse, Toulouse Sud-Est, Toulouse
- Rue Pierre Brossolette, 76680, Saint-Saëns, Arrondissement of Dieppe
- Avenue Pierre Brossolette, 66310, Estagel, Arrondissement of Perpignan
- Rue Pierre Brossolette, 94130, Nogent Village, Nogent-sur-Marne
- Parvis Pierre Brossolette, 34000, Gares, Centre, Montpellier
- Avenue Pierre Brossolette, 10100, Romilly-sur-Seine, Arrondissement of Nogent-sur-Seine
- Rue Pierre Brossolette, 52600, Chalindrey, Arrondissement of Langres
- Rue Pierre Brossolette, 64800, Coarraze, Arrondissement of Pau
- Rue Pierre Brossolette, 65260, Pierrefitte-Nestalas, Arrondissement of Argelès-Gazost
- Rue Pierre Brossolette, 75005, Quartier du Val-de-Grâce, 5th Arrondissement
- Rue Pierre Brossolette, 25490, Fesches-le-Châtel, Arrondissement of Montbéliard
- Allée Pierre Brossolette, 71360, Épinac, Arrondissement of Autun
- Rue Pierre Brossolette, 62380, Esquerdes, Arrondissement of Saint-Omer
- Rue Pierre Brossolette, 10200, Bar-sur-Aube, Arrondissement of Bar-sur-Aube
- Rue Pierre Brossolette, 27600, Gaillon Municipality, Arrondissement of Les Andelys
- Rue Pierre Brossolette, 62270, Frévent, Arrondissement of Arras
- Avenue Pierre Brossolette, 94300, Centre Ville, Vincennes
- Avenue Pierre Brossolette, 94300, Domaine du Bois, Vincennes
- Rue Pierre Brossolette, 43300, Langeac, Arrondissement of Brioude
- Rue Pierre Brossolette, 59430, Fort-Mardyck, Dunkirk
- Rue Pierre Brossolette, 25200, Petite Hollande-Hexagone, Montbéliard
- Rue Pierre Brossolette, 94200, Louis Bertrand - Mirabeau - Sémard, Ivry-sur-Seine
- Allée Pierre Brossolette, 92000, Quartier de l'Université, Nanterre
- Place Pierre Brossolette, 13004, Les Chartreux, 4th Arrondissement, Marseille
- Place Pierre Brossolette, 13004, Les Cinq-Avenues, 4th Arrondissement, Marseille
- Rue Pierre Brossolette, 62700, La Buissière, Bruay-la-Buissière
- Square Pierre Brossolette, 35200, La Poterie, Francisco-Ferrer - Vern - Poterie, Quartiers Sud-Est, Rennes
- Rue Pierre Brossolette, 92500, Village Plaine Gare, Rueil-Malmaison
- Rue Pierre Brossolette, 92130, Quartier Les Hauts d'Issy / Les Epinettes / Le Fort, Issy-les-Moulineaux
- Rue Pierre Brossolette, 92600, Centre-Ville, Asnières-sur-Seine
- Rue Pierre Brossolette, 33600, Noès, Pessac
- Rue Pierre Brossolette, 33700, La Glacière, Mérignac Municipality
- Rue Pierre Brossolette, 49300, Cholet, Cholet
- Avenue Pierre Brossolette, 92240, Quartier Plein Sud, Montrouge
- Avenue Pierre Brossolette, 92240, Quartier Jean Jaurès, Montrouge
- Avenue Pierre Brossolette, 92240, Quartier Portes de Montrouge, Montrouge
- Rue Pierre Brossolette, 78500, Le Val Notre-Dame, Sartrouville
- Rue Pierre Brossolette, 93100, Montreau - Le Morillon, Montreuil Municipality
- Avenue Pierre Brossolette, 94000, Centre Ancien - Chenevier - Déménitroux, Créteil
- Avenue Pierre Brossolette, 94400, Port à l'Anglais, Vitry-sur-Seine
- Pont Pierre Brossolette, 93600, Mairie - Vieux-Pays, Aulnay-sous-Bois
- Pont Pierre Brossolette, 93600, Nonneville, Aulnay-sous-Bois
- Rue Pierre Brossolette, 93600, Nonneville, Aulnay-sous-Bois
- Rue Pierre Brossolette, 93170, Malassis, Bagnolet
- Rue Pierre Brossolette, 94370, Le Petit Val, Sucy-en-Brie
- Rue Pierre Brossolette, 93190, Centre, Livry-Gargan
- Rue Pierre Brossolette, 53000, Le Bourny, Laval Municipality
- Avenue Pierre Brossolette, 78210, Résidence Pierres et Lumières, Saint-Cyr-l'École
- Rue Pierre Brossolette, 49000, La Roseraie, Angers
- Rue Pierre Brossolette, 93130, Centre-Ville - Mairie, Noisy-le-Sec
- Rue Pierre Brossolette, 93500, Petit Pantin - Les Limites, Pantin
- Rue Pierre Brossolette, 93140, Le Saule Blanc, Bondy
- Place Pierre Brossolette, 94600, Gondoles Nord, Choisy-le-Roi
- Quai Pierre Brossolette, 94340, Paris - Canadiens, Joinville-le-Pont
- Quai Pierre Brossolette, 94340, Quai de la Marne, Joinville-le-Pont
- Rue Pierre Brossolette, 94270, La Mairie - Salengro, Le Kremlin-Bicêtre
- Rue Pierre Brossolette, 93160, Quartier Centre, Noisy-le-Grand
- Avenue Georges Clemenceau - Rue Pierre Brossolette, 93160, Quartier Nord-Ouest, Noisy-le-Grand
- Rue Pierre Brossolette, 93160, Quartier Nord-Ouest, Noisy-le-Grand
- Rue Pierre Brossolette, 93200, Delaunay - Belleville - Semard, Saint-Denis Municipality
- Rue Pierre Brossolette, 62110, Quartier Sud, Hénin-Beaumont
- Avenue Pierre Brossolette, 41000, Sud (Vienne), Blois-Vienne, Blois
- Rue Pierre Brossolette, 47300, Saint-Etienne, Villeneuve-sur-Lot
- Rue Pierre Brossolette, 93330, Centre - Bords de Marne - Coulée Verte, Neuilly-sur-Marne
- Rue Pierre Brossolette, 18100, Chaillot, Vierzon
- Rue Pierre Brossolette, 18000, Bourges Nord, Bourges
- Rue Pierre Brossolette, 11500, La Joncquière, Quillan, Quillan
- Avenue Pierre Brossolette, 33150, Les Quatre Pavillons, Cenon
- Rue Pierre Brossolette, 11150, Cité Rancoulle, Bram
- Rue Pierre Brossolette, 11200, Lézignan-Corbières, Lézignan-Corbières
- Rue Pierre Brossolette, 62300, Cité n° 12, Lens
- Rue Pierre Brossolette, 62800, Cité n° 16, Liévin
- Route Pierre Brossolette, 87240, Mazaudon, Ambazac
- Rue Pierre Brossolette, 44400, Saint-Paul, Rezé
- Rue Pierre Brossolette, 93160, Centre, Noisy-le-Grand
- Boulevard Pierre Brossolette, 72100, La Cartoucherie, Le Mans
- Allée Pierre Brossolette, 93700, Cité de la Résistance, Drancy
- Résidence Pierre Brossolette, 83300, Notre-Dame du Peuple, Draguignan
- Avenue Pierre Brossolette, 83300, Le Moulin Neuf, Draguignan
- Avenue Pierre Brossolette, 83300, Le Petit Plan, Draguignan
- Avenue Pierre Brossolette, 33150, Plaisance, Cenon
- Rue Pierre Brossolette, 30000, Chemin Bas d'Avignon, Nîmes
- Rue Pierre Brossolette, 13127, La Frescoule, Vitrolles Municipality
- Impasse Pierre Brossolette, 84170, Lotissement les rives de la Lône 1, Monteux
- Avenue Pierre Brossolette, 13120, Les Logis de Notre-Dame, Gardanne
- Avenue Pierre Brossolette, 40000, Briole, Mont-de-Marsan
- Rue Pierre Brossolette, 33320, Gasteboy, Eysines
- Avenue Pierre Brossolette, 13100, Cuques, Aix-en-Provence
- Rue Pierre Brossolette, 86380, Saint-Léger, Marigny-Brizay, Jaunay-Marigny
- Rue Pierre Brossolette, 29770, Keristumm, Audierne, Audierne
- Rue Pierre Brossolette, 38400, Bidal-Péri, Saint-Martin-d'Hères
- Rue Pierre Brossolette, 02300, Ognes, Ognes Municipality, Arrondissement of Laon
- Rue Pierre Brossolette, 91200, Centre-ville, Athis-Mons
- Rue Pierre Brossolette, 29200, Porte Tourville, Brest
- Quai Pierre Brossolette, 94340, Vautier, Joinville-le-Pont
- Rue Pierre Brossolette, 29770, Kerisbleis, Plogoff
- Rue Pierre Brossolette, 29770, Ar Stumm, Audierne, Audierne
- Rue Pierre Brossolette, 29770, Croas Avel, Plogoff
- Rue Pierre Brossolette, 29770, Lanval, Plogoff
- Rue Pierre Brossolette, 44570, Menée Lambourg, Trignac
- Impasse Pierre Brossolette, 44570, Certé, Trignac
- Rue Pierre Brossolette, 44570, Certé, Trignac
- Rue Pierre Brossolette, 81000, Les Fontanelles, Albi
- Rue Pierre Brossolette, 60100, Plateau Rouher, Creil
- Impasse Pierre Brossolette, 29250, Prédic, Saint-Pol-de-Léon
- Rue Pierre Brossolette, 52000, Les Lavières, Chaumont Municipality
- Avenue Pierre Brossolette, 71400, Bellevue, Autun
- Place Pierre Brossolette, 70400, La Grand Pré, Héricourt, Héricourt Municipality
- Rue Pierre Brossolette, 27000, Le Clos au Duc, Évreux
- Avenue Pierre Brossolette, 13120, Lotissement La Crau, Gardanne
- Rue Pierre Brossolette, 84100, Nogent, Orange
- Rue Pierre Brossolette, 29200, Porte Surcouf, Brest
- Boulevard Pierre Brossolette, 87200, Le Foirail, Saint-Junien
- Boulevard Pierre Brossolette, 87200, Chez le Rat, Saint-Junien
- Boulevard Pierre Brossolette, 02000, Saint-Marcel, Laon
- Avenue Pierre Brossolette, 69500, Les Brosses, Vaulx-en-Velin
- Place Pierre Brossolette, 70400, Champs du Creux, Héricourt, Héricourt Municipality
- Impasse Pierre Brossolette, 29820, Coat Mez, Guilers
- Rue Pierre Brossolette, 94550, Bretagne, Chevilly-Larue
- Rue Pierre Brossolette, 14460, Saint-Pierre Saint-Paul, Colombelles
- Boulevard Pierre Brossolette, 02000, Gare, Laon
- Rue Pierre Brossolette, 63100, Les Vergnes, Clermont-Ferrand
- Avenue Pierre Brossolette, 69500, La Croix, Bron
- Avenue Pierre Brossolette, 69500, Lessivas, Bron
- Rue Pierre Brossolette, 29770, Kerhas, Plogoff
- Rue Pierre Brossolette, 76530, Les Essarts, Grand-Couronne
- Rue Pierre Brossolette, 12150, Moulin de Thibaut, Sévérac-le-Château, Sévérac d'Aveyron
- Rue Pierre Brossolette, 56650, Brangueul, Inzinzac-Lochrist
- Rue Pierre Brossolette, 18510, Fontbertrange, Menetou-Salon
- Rue Pierre Brossolette, 29780, Kersugard, Plouhinec Municipality
- Avenue Pierre Brossolette, 11560, Pleine-Vue-sur-Mer, Fleury Municipality
- Avenue Pierre Brossolette, 11560, Borne, Fleury Municipality
- Impasse Pierre Brossolette, 11560, Borne, Fleury Municipality
- Rue Pierre Brossolette, 26200, Montlouis, Montélimar
- Boulevard Pierre Brossolette, 91220, Résidence de Cossigny, Brétigny-sur-Orge
- Boulevard Pierre Brossolette, 91290, Cité des Grouaisons, Arpajon
- Rue Pierre Brossolette, 37000, Cité Jolivet, Tours
- Rue Pierre Brossolette, 21240, Le Belvédère, Talant
- Rue Pierre Brossolette, 91230, Résidence Gaston Mangin, Montgeron
- Rue Pierre Brossolette, 91270, La Prairie de l'Oly, Montgeron
- Rue Pierre Brossolette, 85000, Les Dorinières, La Roche-sur-Yon
- Avenue Pierre Brossolette, 26800, La Chaffine, Portes-lès-Valence
- Avenue Pierre Brossolette, 26800, Les Aureats, Portes-lès-Valence
- Avenue Pierre Brossolette, 95250, Le Clos de Boissy, Beauchamp
- Rue Pierre Brossolette, 35136, Le Pigeon Blanc, Saint-Jacques-de-la-Lande
- Rue Pierre Brossolette, 91130, La Ferme du Temple, Ris-Orangis
- Rue Pierre Brossolette, 62600, Le Tir aux Pigeons, Berck
- Rue Pierre Brossolette, 59820, Petit-Fort-Philippe, Gravelines
- Rue Pierre Brossolette, 69200, Moulin à Vent, Vénissieux
- Rue Pierre Brossolette, 91330, Le Champ Blanc, Yerres
- Rue Pierre Brossolette, 91330, Le Taillis, Yerres
- Rue Pierre Brossolette, 09200, Les Vignes, Saint-Girons
- Rue Pierre Brossolette, 91430, Gommonvilliers, Igny Municipality
- Rue Pierre Brossolette, 62210, Cité des Bouviers, Avion
- Rue Pierre Brossolette, 93310, Cité-Jardin Henri Sellier, Le Pré-Saint-Gervais
- Rue Pierre Brossolette, 64000, Guilhem, Le Hameau, Pau
- Rue Pierre Brossolette, 17450, La Grand' Plante, Fouras
- Rue Pierre Brossolette, 29630, Pont Coz, Plougasnou
- Rue Pierre Brossolette, 81400, Le Bourg, Saint-Benoît-de-Carmaux
- Rue Pierre Brossolette, 33240, Peyrillac, Lugon-et-l'Île-du-Carnay
- Rue Pierre Brossolette, 81400, La Plaine de Groc, Carmaux
- Route Pierre Brossolette, 87240, Le Got de Mazaudon, Ambazac
- Rue Pierre Brossolette, 13127, Les Pignes, Vitrolles Municipality
- Place Pierre Brossolette, 92310, Les Jardies, Sèvres
- Place Pierre Brossolette, 92310, Les Prés Verdy, Sèvres
- Rue Pierre Brossolette, 29720, Keriequel, Plonéour-Lanvern
- Rue Pierre Brossolette, 91430, Les Ruchères, Igny Municipality
- Route Pierre Brossolette, 87240, Le Pont de Jonas, Ambazac
- Rue Pierre Brossolette, 10190, Le Moulin Gonin, Estissac
- Rue Pierre Brossolette, 10190, Le Bas de Pennerats, Estissac
- Avenue Pierre Brossolette, 77000, Quartier de l'Almont, Melun
- Impasse Pierre Brossolette, 47240, Labonde, Bon-Encontre
- Rue Pierre Brossolette, 54800, Bois du Four, Jarny
- Rue Pierre Brossolette, 44260, Le Pré du Matz, Savenay
- Rue Pierre Brossolette, 10160, Faubourg Notre Dame, Aix-en-Othe, Aix-Villemaur-Pâlis
- Impasse Pierre Brossolette, 10190, Le Fauchiot, Estissac
- Rue Pierre Brossolette, 10190, L'Île Close, Estissac
- Rue Pierre Brossolette, 10350, Voie de Belleville, Saint-Flavy
- Rue Pierre Brossolette, 91130, La Mare à Pilatre, Ris-Orangis
- Rue Pierre Brossolette, 95240, Le Village, Cormeilles-en-Parisis
- Rue Pierre Brossolette, 95240, Le Martray, Cormeilles-en-Parisis
- Rue Pierre Brossolette, 10130, Loge Borgne, Chessy-les-Prés
- Rue Pierre Brossolette, 10130, Les Avinières, Marolles-sous-Lignières
- Rue Pierre Brossolette, 71230, Les Bois Francs, Saint-Vallier Municipality
- Rue Pierre Brossolette, 13130, Cité Boety, Berre-l'Étang
- Avenue Pierre Brossolette, 84350, La Plaine, Courthézon
- Rue Pierre Brossolette, 84000, Grange d'Orel, Avignon
- Rue Pierre Brossolette, 56570, Le Gelin, Locmiquélic
- Rue Pierre Brossolette, 78450, Les Hauts du Moulin, Villepreux
- Rue Pierre Brossolette, 30400, Villeneuve Centre, Villeneuve-lès-Avignon
- Rue Pierre Brossolette, 84310, Morières Centre, Morières-lès-Avignon
- Rue Pierre Brossolette, 62217, Petit Bapaume, Achicourt
- Rue Pierre Brossolette, 45200, Bas du Grand Clos, Amilly Municipality
- Rue Pierre Brossolette, 45120, Le Petit Lancy, Châlette-sur-Loing
- Allée Pierre Brossolette, 37270, Sous les Bodets, Montlouis-sur-Loire
- Rue Pierre Brossolette, 56600, Le Penher, Lanester
- Rue Pierre Brossolette, 56600, Toulhouët, Lanester
- Impasse Pierre Brossolette, 24150, Clos de la Roque, Lalinde
- Impasse Pierre Brossolette, 11100, Saint-Salvayre, Narbonne
- Rue Pierre Brossolette, 26240, Ollanet, Saint-Vallier Municipality
- Rue Pierre Brossolette, 87800, Les Garennes, Nexon
- Rue Pierre Brossolette, 56100, Le Moustoir, Lorient
- Rue Pierre Brossolette, 45400, Clos de l'Arche, Fleury-les-Aubrais
- Rue Pierre Brossolette, 29100, Tréboul, Douarnenez
- Rue Pierre Brossolette, 29100, Golvez, Douarnenez
- Rue Pierre Brossolette, 19360, Château de Sérignac, Malemort-sur-Corrèze, Malemort
- Boulevard Pierre Brossolette, 91220, Éco-Quartier Clause - Bois Badeau, Brétigny-sur-Orge
- Place Pierre Brossolette, 10370, Les Dix Arpents, Villenauxe-la-Grande
- Place Pierre Brossolette, 10370, Les Prés Prés Le Château, Villenauxe-la-Grande
- Passage Pierre Brossolette, 31130, Résidence Pierre Aussire, Balma
- Rue Pierre Brossolette, 52100, Les Orgères, Bettancourt-la-Ferrée
- Avenue Pierre Brossolette, 92350, Cité Haute, Le Plessis-Robinson
- Place Pierre Brossolette, 52600, Croix Saint-Pierre, Chalindrey
- Rue Pierre Brossolette, 64400, Pic d'Arlas, Oloron-Sainte-Marie
- Rue Pierre Brossolette, 66380, Le Saint André, Pia
- Rue Pierre Brossolette, 51800, Les Jardins des Ruelles, Sainte-Menehould
- Rue Pierre Brossolette, 51170, Sous la Tour, Fismes
- Rue Pierre Brossolette, 10410, Le Pied Aux Vaches, Saint-Parres-aux-Tertres
- Rue Pierre Brossolette, 10410, Les Epicières, Saint-Parres-aux-Tertres
- Rue Pierre Brossolette, 54490, Derrière le Village, Piennes
- Rue Pierre Brossolette, 93270, Rougemont, Rougemont - Charcot, Sevran
- Rue Pierre Brossolette, 57250, Grande Vigne, Moyeuvre-Grande
- Rue Pierre Brossolette, 59150, Beaulieu, Wattrelos
- Rue Pierre Brossolette, 62740, Au Quinze, Fouquières-lès-Lens
- Rue Pierre Brossolette, 37400, Malétrenne, Amboise
- Rue Pierre Brossolette, 28500, La Croix Giboreau, Vernouillet Municipality
- Rue Pierre Brossolette, 10190, Les Clozos, Fontvannes
- Rue Pierre Brossolette, 10600, Prés de Lyon, La Chapelle-Saint-Luc
- Rue Pierre Brossolette, 93230, Résidence Duclos, Romainville
- Rue Pierre Brossolette, 58160, Champ des Jalons, Imphy
- Avenue Pierre Brossolette, 83300, Sant Armentari, Draguignan
- Résidence Pierre Brossolette, 83300, Sant Armentari, Draguignan
- Rue Pierre Brossolette, 58300, Lotissement de Jumilhac, Faubourg d'Allier, Decize
- Rue Pierre Brossolette, 69008, La Petite-Guille, Lyon 8e Arrondissement, Lyon
- Place Pierre Brossolette, 33140, Seeheim-Jugenheim, Villenave-d'Ornon
- Impasse Pierre Brossolette, 18270, La Ville, Culan
- Avenue Pierre Brossolette, 41000, Les Métaires, Sud (Vienne), Blois-Vienne, Blois
- Rue Pierre Brossolette, 37400, Les Corneaux, Amboise
- Rue Pierre Brossolette, 37400, La Croix Moreau, Amboise
- Impasse Pierre Brossolette, 24660, Cité Jacqueline Auriol, Coulounieix-Chamiers
- Rue Pierre Brossolette, 24660, Cité Jacqueline Auriol, Coulounieix-Chamiers
- Rue Pierre Brossolette, 76200, Neuville-lès-Dieppe, Dieppe
- Rue Pierre Brossolette, 69210, Square Charley, L'Arbresle
- Avenue Pierre Brossolette, 41000, Les Prés de Lesse, Sud (Vienne), Blois-Vienne, Blois
- Rue Pierre Brossolette, 37390, La Grande Noue, Notre-Dame-d'Oé
- Rue Pierre Brossolette, 11000, Le Viguier, Carcassonne
- Rue Pierre Brossolette, 62230, Fraternité, Outreau
- Rue Pierre Brossolette, 37700, Les Sablons, Saint-Pierre-des-Corps
- Rue Pierre Brossolette, 41100, La Fosse Piquet, Vendôme-Quartiers Nord, Vendôme
- Rue Pierre Brossolette, 79000, La Brissonniere, Sainte-Pezenne, Niort
- Allée Pierre Brossolette, 37160, Le Marchais des Granges, Descartes
- Rue Pierre Brossolette, 29000, Kervir, Quimper
- Rue Pierre Brossolette, Arrondissement of Argelès-Gazost, Hautes Pyrenees
- Rue Pierre Brossolette, Arrondissement d'Évry, Essonne
- Rue Pierre Brossolette, Avion, Arrondissement of Lens
- Rue Pierre Brossolette, Trignac, Arrondissement of Saint-Nazaire
- Rue Pierre Brossolette, Brest, Arrondissement of Brest
- Rue Pierre Brossolette, Arrondissement of Lille, Nord
- Rue Pierre Brossolette, Arrondissement of Antony, Hauts-de-Seine
- Rue Pierre Brossolette, Arrondissement of Amiens, Somme
- Rue Pierre Brossolette, Talant, Arrondissement of Dijon
- Rue Pierre Brossolette, Douarnenez, Arrondissement of Quimper
- Rue Pierre Brossolette, Amboise, Arrondissement of Loches
- Rue Pierre Brossolette, Marolles-sous-Lignières, Arrondissement of Troyes
- Rue Pierre Brossolette, Vitrolles Municipality, Arrondissement of Istres
- Rue Pierre Brossolette, Audierne, Audierne
- Rue Pierre Brossolette, Noisy-le-Grand, Arrondissement of Le Raincy
- Rue Pierre Brossolette, Igny Municipality, Arrondissement of Palaiseau
- Rue Pierre Brossolette, Plogoff, Arrondissement of Quimper
- Rue Pierre Brossolette, Estissac, Arrondissement of Troyes
- Rue Pierre Brossolette, Cormeilles-en-Parisis, Arrondissement of Argenteuil
- Rue Pierre Brossolette, Yerres, Arrondissement d'Évry
- Rue Pierre Brossolette, Saint-Parres-aux-Tertres, Arrondissement of Troyes
- Rue Pierre Brossolette, Lanester, Arrondissement of Lorient
- Rue Pierre Brossolette, Lyon 8e Arrondissement, Lyon
- Rue du Colonel Pierre Brossolette, Arrondissement de L'Haÿ-les-Roses, Val-de-Marne
- Résidence Pierre Brossolette, Draguignan, Arrondissement of Draguignan
- Quai Pierre Brossolette, Joinville-le-Pont, Arrondissement of Nogent-sur-Marne
- Pont Pierre Brossolette, Aulnay-sous-Bois, Arrondissement of Le Raincy
- Place Pierre Brossolette, 4th Arrondissement, Marseille
- Place Pierre Brossolette, Sèvres, Arrondissement of Boulogne-Billancourt
- Place Pierre Brossolette, Héricourt, Héricourt Municipality
- Place Pierre Brossolette, Villenauxe-la-Grande, Arrondissement of Nogent-sur-Seine
- Boulevard Pierre Brossolette, Le Grand-Quevilly, Arrondissement of Rouen
- Boulevard Pierre Brossolette, Saint-Junien, Arrondissement of Rochechouart
- Boulevard Pierre Brossolette, Laon, Arrondissement of Laon
- Boulevard Pierre Brossolette, Brétigny-sur-Orge, Arrondissement of Palaiseau
- Boulevard Pierre Brossolette, Arpajon, Arrondissement of Palaiseau
- Avenue Pierre Brossolette, Vincennes, Arrondissement of Nogent-sur-Marne
- Avenue Pierre Brossolette, Portes-lès-Valence, Arrondissement of Valence
- Avenue Pierre Brossolette, Draguignan, Arrondissement of Draguignan
- Avenue Pierre Brossolette, Arrondissement of Nogent-sur-Marne, Val-de-Marne
- Avenue Pierre Brossolette, Cenon, Arrondissement of Bordeaux
- Avenue Georges Clemenceau - Rue Pierre Brossolette, Noisy-le-Grand, Arrondissement of Le Raincy

=== By county ===
As of 2010, France counts 36 683 counties averaging an area of 14.88 km².

==== Among top 500 counties in France ====
The top 500 populated counties account for a population of 26.5M (40% of the overall French population).

| County | Dépt. | Type |
|---|---|---|
| Paris | 75 | Rue |
| Marseille | 13 | Place |
| Lyon | 69 | |
| Toulouse | 31 | Rue |
| Nice | 06 | |
| Nantes | 44 | |
| Strasbourg | 67 | |
| Montpellier | 34 | |
| Bordeaux | 33 | Rue |
| Lille | 59 | Rue |
| Rennes | 35 | Square |
| Reims | 51 | Rue |
| Le Havre | 76 | Rue |
| Saint-Étienne | 42 | Rue |
| Toulon | 83 | |
| Grenoble | 38 | |
| Dijon | 21 | |
| Angers | 49 | Rue |
| Le Mans | 72 | Boulevard |
| Villeurbanne | 69 | |
| Saint-Denis | 974 | |
| Brest | 29 | Rue |
| Brest | 29 | Impasse |
| Nîmes | 30 | Rue |
| Aix-en-Provence | 13 | Avenue |
| Clermont-Ferrand | 63 | |
| Limoges | 87 | Avenue |
| Limoges | 87 | Rue |
| Tours | 37 | Rue |
| Amiens | 80 | Rue |
| Metz | 57 | |
| Besançon | 25 | |
| Perpignan | 66 | |
| Orléans | 45 | |
| Boulogne-Billancourt | 92 | |
| Rouen | 76 | |
| Caen | 14 | |
| Mulhouse | 68 | Rue |
| Saint-Denis | 93 | Rue |
| Nancy | 54 | |
| Argenteuil | 95 | |
| Saint-Paul | 974 | Rue |
| Montreuil | 93 | Rue |
| Roubaix | 59 | Rue |
| Dunkerque | 59 | Rue |
| Tourcoing | 59 | |
| Avignon | 84 | Rue |
| Nanterre | 92 | Allée |
| Créteil | 94 | Avenue |
| Poitiers | 86 | |
| Fort-de-France | 972 | |
| Versailles | 78 | |
| Courbevoie | 92 | Rue |
| Vitry-sur-Seine | 94 | Avenue |
| Colombes | 92 | Rue |
| Asnières-sur-Seine | 92 | Rue |
| Aulnay-sous-Bois | 93 | Pont |
| Pau | 64 | Rue |
| Rueil-Malmaison | 92 | Rue |
| Saint-Pierre | 974 | |
| La Rochelle | 17 | |
| Aubervilliers | 93 | |
| Champigny-sur-Marne | 94 | Avenue |
| Saint-Maur-des-Fossés | 94 | Avenue |
| Antibes | 06 | |
| Calais | 62 | Rue |
| Cannes | 06 | |
| Le Tampon | 974 | |
| Béziers | 34 | Rue |
| Saint-Nazaire | 44 | Rue |
| Colmar | 68 | |
| Bourges | 18 | |
| Drancy | 93 | Allée |
| Mérignac | 33 | Rue |
| Quimper | 29 | Rue |
| Ajaccio | 20A | |
| Issy-les-Moulineaux | 92 | Rue |
| Valence | 26 | |
| Levallois-Perret | 92 | Rue |
| Levallois-Perret | 92 | Square |
| Villeneuve-d'Ascq | 59 | |
| Noisy-le-Grand | 93 | Rue |
| La Seyne-sur-Mer | 83 | |
| Antony | 92 | Boulevard |
| Neuilly-sur-Seine | 92 | |
| Troyes | 10 | Avenue |
| Vénissieux | 69 | Rue |
| Niort | 79 | |
| Les Abymes | 971 | |
| Clichy | 92 | |
| Sarcelles | 95 | Rue |
| Chambéry | 73 | |
| Pessac | 33 | Avenue |
| Lorient | 56 | Rue |
| Ivry-sur-Seine | 94 | Rue |
| Montauban | 82 | Rue |
| Cergy | 95 | |
| Saint-Quentin | 02 | Rue |
| Beauvais | 60 | |
| Cholet | 49 | Rue |
| La Roche-sur-Yon | 85 | Rue |
| Cayenne | 973 | |
| Hyères | 83 | Rue |
| Villejuif | 94 | |
| Vannes | 56 | |
| Épinay-sur-Seine | 93 | |
| Pantin | 93 | Rue |
| Saint-André | 974 | |
| Laval | 53 | Rue |
| Bondy | 93 | Rue |
| Arles | 13 | Rue |
| Fontenay-sous-Bois | 94 | Rue |
| Castres | 94 | |
| Évreux | 27 | Rue |
| Chelles | 77 | |
| Clamart | 92 | Rue |
| Évry | 91 | |
| Fréjus | 83 | |
| Meaux | 77 | Passage |
| Saint-Louis | 974 | |
| Narbonne | 11 | Rue |
| Narbonne | 11 | Impasse |
| Narbonne-Plage | 11 | Quai |
| Annecy | 74 | |
| Grasse | 06 | |
| Le Blanc-Mesnil | 93 | Avenue |
| Charleville-Mézières | 08 | Rue |
| Sartrouville | 78 | Rue |
| Belfort | 90 | Rue |
| Albi | 81 | |
| Brive-la-Gaillarde | 19 | Boulevard |
| Brive-la-Gaillarde | 19 | Allée |
| Sevran | 93 | Rue |
| Montrouge | 92 | Avenue |
| Vincennes | 94 | Avenue |
| Carcassonne | 11 | Rue |
| Blois | 41 | Avenue |
| Martigues | 13 | Rue |
| Saint-Brieuc | 22 | |
| Châteauroux | 36 | |
| Saint-Malo | 35 | |
| Bobigny | 93 | |
| Cagnes-sur-Mer | 06 | |
| Saint-Ouen | 93 | |
| Suresnes | 92 | |
| Aubagne | 13 | Avenue |
| Chalon-sur-Saône | 71 | |
| Châlons-en-Champagne | 51 | Avenue |
| Bayonne | 64 | |
| Meudon | 92 | |
| Puteaux | 92 | |
| Tarbes | 65 | |
| Alfortville | 94 | |
| Valenciennes | 59 | |
| Angoulême | 16 | Rue |
| Saint-Herblain | 44 | |
| Castres | 81 | |
| Salon-de-Provence | 13 | Rue |
| Boulogne-sur-Mer | 62 | Rue |
| Corbeil-Essonnes | 91 | Avenue |
| Istres | 13 | Rue |
| Bastia | 20B | |
| Douai | 59 | Rue |
| Douai | 59 | Place |
| Sète | 34 | Rue |
| Sète | 34 | Place |
| Arras | 62 | |
| Mantes-la-Jolie | 78 | |
| Massy | 91 | |
| Le Cannet | 06 | |
| Alès | 30 | Rue |
| Saint-Priest | 69 | |
| Compiègne | 60 | |
| Bourg-en-Bresse | 01 | |
| Livry-Gargan | 93 | Rue |
| Saint-Germain-en-Laye | 78 | |
| Talence | 33 | |
| Thionville | 57 | |
| Vaulx-en-Velin | 69 | Square |
| Caluire-et-Cuire | 69 | |
| Wattrelos | 59 | Rue |
| Gennevilliers | 92 | |
| Gap | 05 | |
| Rosny-sous-Bois | 93 | Rue |
| Choisy-le-Roi | 94 | Place |
| Melun | 77 | Avenue |
| Chartres | 28 | Rue |
| Garges-lès-Gonesse | 95 | Rue |
| Le Lamentin | 972 | |
| Noisy-le-Sec | 93 | Rue |
| Marcq-en-Baroeul | 59 | Rue |
| Cherbourg-Octeville | 50 | Rue |
| Montluçon | 03 | Rue |
| Rezé | 44 | Rue |
| Anglet | 64 | |
| Gagny | 93 | |
| Bron | 69 | Avenue |
| Le Port | 974 | Rue |
| Saint-Laurent-du-Maroni | 973 | |
| Bagneux | 92 | Rue |
| La Courneuve | 93 | |
| Nevers | 58 | |
| Auxerre | 89 | |
| Roanne | 42 | Rue |
| Poissy | 78 | |
| Draguignan | 83 | Avenue |
| Savigny-sur-Orge | 91 | Rue |
| Montélimar | 26 | Rue |
| Joué-lès-Tours | 37 | |
| Saint-Martin-d'Hères | 38 | Rue |
| Saint-Joseph | 974 | |
| Saint-Chamond | 42 | |
| Échirolles | 38 | |
| Villepinte | 93 | Avenue |
| Villefranche-sur-Saône | 69 | |
| Pontault-Combault | 77 | |
| Conflans-Sainte-Honorine | 78 | |
| Lens | 62 | Rue |
| Colomiers | 31 | |
| Vitrolles | 13 | Rue |
| Six-Fours-les-Plages | 83 | |
| Agen | 47 | Allée |
| Thonon-les-Bains | 74 | |
| Saint-Benoît | 974 | |
| Mâcon | 71 | |
| Haguenau | 67 | |
| Marignane | 13 | Rue |
| Tremblay-en-France | 93 | Rue |
| Épinal | 88 | |
| Sainte-Geneviève-des-Bois | 91 | Rue |
| Romans-sur-Isère | 26 | Rue |
| La Ciotat | 13 | |
| Bagnolet | 93 | Rue |
| Saint-Raphaël | 83 | |
| Stains | 93 | |
| Creil | 60 | Rue |
| Montigny-le-Bretonneux | 78 | |
| Neuilly-sur-Marne | 93 | Rue |
| Châtellerault | 86 | Rond-point |
| Cambrai | 59 | |
| Franconville | 95 | |
| Mont-de-Marsan | 40 | Avenue |
| Dieppe | 76 | Rue |
| Châtillon | 92 | Rue |
| Le Perreux-sur-Marne | 94 | Avenue |
| Annemasse | 74 | |
| Châtenay-Malabry | 92 | |
| Villeneuve-Saint-Georges | 94 | |
| Viry-Châtillon | 91 | Avenue |
| Viry-Châtillon | 91 | Impasse |
| Liévin | 62 | Rue |
| Nogent-sur-Marne | 94 | Rue |
| Houilles | 78 | |
| Dreux | 28 | |
| Vandoeuvre-lès-Nancy | 54 | |
| Maubeuge | 59 | |
| Plaisir | 78 | |
| Malakoff | 92 | Avenue |
| Saint-Leu | 974 | |
| Goussainville | 95 | |
| Schiltigheim | 67 | |
| Palaiseau | 91 | |
| Les Mureaux | 78 | |
| Pontoise | 95 | |
| Périgueux | 24 | |
| Athis-Mons | 91 | Rue |
| La Possession | 974 | |
| Baie-Mahault | 971 | |
| Meyzieu | 69 | Rue |
| Meyzieu | 69 | Impasse |
| Chatou | 78 | |
| L' Haÿ-les-Roses | 94 | Rue |
| Saint-Cloud | 92 | |
| Rillieux-la-Pape | 69 | |
| Carpentras | 84 | |
| Sainte-Marie | 974 | |
| Saint-Laurent-du-Var | 06 | |
| Vienne | 38 | |
| Clichy-sous-Bois | 93 | |
| Thiais | 94 | |
| Soissons | 02 | |
| Orange | 84 | |
| Trappes | 78 | Rue |
| Le Chesnay | 78 | |
| Aurillac | 15 | |
| Charenton-le-Pont | 94 | |
| Bois-Colombes | 92 | |
| Sotteville-lès-Rouen | 76 | Rue |
| Yerres | 91 | Rue |
| Menton | 06 | |
| Villenave-d'Ornon | 33 | Place |
| Lambersart | 59 | |
| Savigny-le-Temple | 77 | |
| Draveil | 91 | Rue |
| Saumur | 49 | |
| Bergerac | 24 | |
| Saint-Étienne-du-Rouvray | 76 | |
| Cachan | 94 | |
| Guyancourt | 78 | Rue |
| Vallauris | 06 | |
| Aix-les-Bains | 73 | |
| Matoury | 973 | |
| Saint-Médard-en-Jalles | 33 | |
| Bezons | 95 | |
| Villemomble | 93 | |
| Pierrefitte-sur-Seine | 93 | Avenue |
| Le Plessis-Robinson | 92 | Avenue |
| La Garenne-Colombes | 92 | Rue |
| Alençon | 61 | |
| Ermont | 95 | |
| Ris-Orangis | 91 | Rue |
| Vierzon | 18 | Rue |
| Villiers-sur-Marne | 94 | Rue |
| Illkirch-Graffenstaden | 67 | |
| Vigneux-sur-Seine | 91 | Rue |
| Saintes | 17 | |
| Vanves | 92 | |
| Élancourt | 78 | |
| Villiers-le-Bel | 95 | Allée |
| Rambouillet | 78 | |
| Laon | 02 | Boulevard |
| Bourgoin-Jallieu | 38 | |
| Grigny | 91 | Rue |
| Le Gosier | 971 | |
| Hénin-Beaumont | 62 | Rue |
| Sannois | 95 | |
| Gonesse | 95 | Avenue |
| Saint-Dizier | 52 | |
| Herblay | 95 | |
| Béthune | 62 | |
| Montbéliard | 25 | Rue |
| Fresnes | 94 | |
| Taverny | 95 | Rue |
| La Garde | 83 | |
| Vernon | 27 | |
| Le Kremlin-Bicêtre | 94 | Rue |
| Sucy-en-Brie | 94 | Rue |
| Romainville | 93 | Rue |
| Biarritz | 64 | |
| Décines-Charpieu | 69 | |
| Rodez | 12 | |
| Rochefort | 17 | |
| Tournefeuille | 31 | Rue |
| Saint-Sébastien-sur-Loire | 44 | |
| Miramas | 13 | Rue |
| Armentières | 59 | Avenue |
| Brunoy | 91 | |
| Dole | 39 | |
| Sens | 89 | |
| Lunel | 34 | |
| Montfermeil | 93 | |
| Cavaillon | 84 | Rue |
| Oullins | 69 | |
| Kourou | 973 | |
| Villeneuve-la-Garenne | 92 | Rue |
| Vichy | 03 | |
| Orvault | 44 | |
| Bègles | 33 | Rue |
| Le Grand-Quevilly | 76 | Boulevard |
| Le Grand-Quevilly | 76 | Échangeur |
| Les Ulis | 91 | |
| La Teste-de-Buch | 33 | |
| Agde | 34 | |
| Abbeville | 80 | Rue |
| Épernay | 51 | |
| Villeneuve-sur-Lot | 47 | Rue |
| Muret | 31 | |
| Champs-sur-Marne | 77 | |
| Sainte-Anne | 971 | |
| Chaumont | 52 | Rue |
| Eaubonne | 95 | Rue |
| Libourne | 33 | |
| Villeparisis | 77 | |
| Le Robert | 972 | |
| Saint-Ouen-l'Aumône | 95 | Rue |
| Bruay-la-Buissière | 62 | Rue |
| Brétigny-sur-Orge | 91 | Boulevard |
| Bussy-Saint-Georges | 77 | |
| Petit-Bourg | 971 | |
| Fontenay-aux-Roses | 92 | Rue |
| Étampes | 91 | |
| Gradignan | 33 | |
| Le Bouscat | 33 | Avenue |
| Sèvres | 92 | Place |
| Cormeilles-en-Parisis | 95 | Rue |
| Oyonnax | 01 | |
| Maisons-Laffitte | 78 | |
| Le Creusot | 71 | |
| Beaune | 21 | |
| Montgeron | 91 | Avenue |
| Montigny-lès-Metz | 57 | |
| Auch | 32 | Rue |
| Coudekerque-Branche | 59 | |
| Manosque | 04 | |
| Millau | 12 | |
| La Madeleine | 59 | |
| Lanester | 56 | Rue |
| Frontignan | 34 | Rue |
| Le Moule | 971 | |
| Saint-Mandé | 94 | |
| Torcy | 77 | Allée |
| Sainte-Suzanne | 974 | |
| Cenon | 33 | Avenue |
| Lisieux | 14 | |
| Roissy-en-Brie | 77 | |
| Mandelieu-la-Napoule | 06 | |
| Fontaine | 38 | |
| Les Lilas | 93 | Rond-point |
| Sainte-Foy-lès-Lyon | 69 | |
| Saint-Dié-des-Vosges | 88 | |
| Le Petit-Quevilly | 76 | Rue |
| Blagnac | 31 | |
| Vertou | 44 | |
| Sarreguemines | 57 | |
| Hazebrouck | 59 | |
| Loos | 59 | Rue |
| Mons-en-Baroeul | 59 | |
| Les Pavillons-sous-Bois | 93 | Allée |
| Forbach | 57 | |
| Bois-Guillaume - Bihorel | 76 | |
| Combs-la-Ville | 77 | Rue |
| Hérouville-Saint-Clair | 14 | |
| Deuil-la-Barre | 95 | |
| Dax | 40 | |
| Orly | 94 | |
| Longjumeau | 91 | |
| Montmorency | 95 | |
| Fleury-les-Aubrais | 45 | Rue |
| La Celle-Saint-Cloud | 78 | Rue |
| Cahors | 46 | |
| Gif-sur-Yvette | 91 | |
| Grande-Synthe | 59 | |
| Schoelcher | 972 | |
| Morsang-sur-Orge | 91 | |
| La Valette-du-Var | 83 | Avenue |
| La Valette-du-Var | 83 | Carrefour |
| Lannion | 22 | |
| Saint-Genis-Laval | 69 | |
| Croix | 59 | |
| Dammarie-les-Lys | 77 | |
| Annecy-le-Vieux | 74 | |
| Le Mée-sur-Seine | 77 | |
| Gardanne | 13 | Avenue |
| Neuilly-Plaisance | 93 | Rue |
| Fougères | 35 | |
| Ozoir-la-Ferrière | 77 | Avenue |
| Voiron | 38 | |
| Lagny-sur-Marne | 77 | |
| Denain | 59 | |
| Saint-Louis | 68 | |
| Sainte-Rose | 971 | |
| Halluin | 59 | Rue |
| Vélizy-Villacoublay | 78 | |
| Saint-Michel-sur-Orge | 91 | |
| Saint-Gratien | 95 | Rue |
| Bourg-la-Reine | 92 | |
| Wasquehal | 59 | Rue |
| Lunéville | 54 | |
| Lormont | 33 | Rue |
| Moulins | 03 | |
| Olivet | 45 | |
| Limeil-Brévannes | 94 | |
| Eysines | 33 | Rue |
| Sceaux | 92 | |
| Arcueil | 94 | Rue |
| Saint-Lô | 50 | |
| Tassin-la-Demi-Lune | 69 | |
| Mont-Saint-Aignan | 76 | |
| Gujan-Mestras | 33 | |
| Montceau-les-Mines | 71 | |
| Allauch | 13 | |
| Achères | 78 | |
| Verdun | 55 | |
| Albertville | 73 | |
| Cournon-d'Auvergne | 63 | |
| Les Pennes-Mirabeau | 13 | |
| Remire-Montjoly | 973 | |
| Concarneau | 29 | |
| Bressuire | 79 | |
| Le Puy-en-Velay | 43 | |
| Saint-Jean-de-Braye | 45 | |
| Fécamp | 76 | |
| Sélestat | 67 | |
| Le François | 972 | |
| Capesterre-Belle-Eau | 971 | |
| L' Isle-sur-la-Sorgue | 84 | |
| Seynod | 74 | |
| Vence | 06 | |
| Mantes-la-Ville | 78 | Rue |
| Challans | 85 | |
| Cognac | 16 | |
| Le Plessis-Trévise | 94 | |
| Montigny-lès-Cormeilles | 95 | |
| Mougins | 06 | |
| Pertuis | 84 | |
| Givors | 69 | |
| Pontarlier | 25 | |
| Nogent-sur-Oise | 60 | |
| Bourg-lès-Valence | 26 | Rue |
| Marmande | 47 | |
| Sedan | 08 | |
| Maurepas | 78 | |
| Chaville | 92 | |
| Couëron | 44 | |
| Bouguenais | 44 | |
| Bagnols-sur-Cèze | 30 | |
| Villefontaine | 38 | |
| Riom | 63 | Rue |
| Royan | 17 | |
| Mitry-Mory | 77 | |
| Chilly-Mazarin | 91 | Avenue |
| Chevilly-Larue | 94 | Rue |

- Street/square count: 211
- County count: 199
- Population coverage: 52% (13.6M inhabitants)

In a nutshell, 1 out of 2 Frenchmen residing in a top 500 county will have that county featuring a street/square Pierre-Brossolette.

==== Remaining featured French counties ====
| County | Dépt. | Type |
|---|---|---|
| Ploemeur | 56 | Rue |
| Villeneuve-le-Roi | 94 | Rue du Colonel |
| Le Pré-Saint-Gervais | 93 | Rue |
| Joinville-le-Pont | 94 | Quai |
| Saint-Cyr-l'École | 78 | Rue |
| Les Clayes-sous-Bois | 78 | Avenue |
| Vendôme | 41 | Rue |
| Port-de-Bouc | 13 | Rue |
| Elbeuf | 76 | Rue |
| Avion | 62 | Rue |
| Saint-Jean-de-la-Ruelle | 45 | Rue |
| Montereau-fault-Yonne | 77 | Rue |
| Saint-Amand-les-Eaux | 59 | Rue |
| Le Pecq | 78 | Boulevard |
| Limay | 78 | Rue |
| Mauguio | 34 | Rue |
| Floirac | 33 | Rue |
| Plaisance-du-Touch | 31 | Rue |
| Tourlaville | 50 | Rue |
| Sin-le-Noble | 59 | Rue |
| Viroflay | 78 | Rue |
| Landerneau | 29 | Rue |
| Verrières-le-Buisson | 91 | Rue |
| Bry-sur-Marne | 94 | Rue |
| Berck-sur-Mer | 62 | Rue |
| Saint-Pierre-des-Corps | 37 | Rue |
| Hennebont | 56 | Rue |
| Douarnenez | 29 | Rue |
| Douarnenez | 29 | Impasse |
| Montesson | 78 | Rue |
| Montesson | 78 | Place |
| Canteleu | 76 | Allée |
| Châteaurenard | 13 | Avenue |
| Pont-à-Mousson | 54 | Allée |
| Outreau | 62 | Rue |
| Caudry | 59 | Rue |
| Guéret | 23 | Rue |
| Mayenne | 53 | Rue |
| Châteaudun | 28 | Rue |
| Bouc-Bel-Air | 13 | Boulevard |
| Balma | 31 | Passage |
| Romilly-sur-Seine | 10 | Avenue |
| Berre-l'Étang | 13 | Rue |
| Arnouville-lès-Gonesse | 95 | Rue |
| Méru | 60 | Rue |
| Issoudun | 36 | Rue |
| La Chapelle-Saint-Luc | 10 | Rue |
| Châlette-sur-Loing | 45 | Rue |
| Amboise | 37 | Rue |
| Lys-lez-Lannoy | 59 | Rue |
| Roncq | 59 | Rue |
| Villeneuve-lès-Avignon | 30 | Rue |
| Villeneuve-lès-Avignon | 30 | Traverse |
| Fontenay-le-Fleury | 78 | Rue |
| Bully-les-Mines | 62 | Rue |
| Bruay-sur-l'Escaut | 59 | Rue |
| Noeux-les-Mines | 62 | Rue |
| Morangis | 91 | Place |
| Amilly | 45 | Rue |
| Vernouillet | 28 | Rue |
| Gravelines | 59 | Rue |
| Saint-Junien | 87 | Boulevard |
| Châteauneuf-lès-Martigues | 13 | Rue |
| Talant | 21 | Rue |
| Longuenesse | 62 | Rue |
| Oloron-Sainte-Marie | 64 | Rue |
| Nogent-le-Rotrou | 28 | Rue |
| Guilherand-Granges | 07 | Rue |
| Castanet-Tolosan | 31 | Impasse |
| Solliès-Pont | 83 | Rue |
| Claye-Souilly | 77 | Rue |
| Riorges | 42 | Rue |
| Igny | 91 | Rue |
| Arpajon | 91 | Boulevard |
| Villers-Cotterêts | 02 | Rue |
| Lézignan-Corbières | 11 | Rue |
| Saint-Jacques-de-la-Lande | 35 | Rue |
| Héricourt | 70 | Place |
| Panazol | 87 | Rue |
| Mainvilliers | 28 | Rue |
| Persan | 95 | Rue |
| Sainte-Savine | 10 | Rue |
| Tinqueux | 51 | Rue |
| Trets | 13 | Rue |
| Saint-Jean | 31 | Rue |
| Carmaux | 81 | Rue |
| Corbas | 69 | Rue |
| Sarlat-la-Canéda | 24 | Rue |
| Épinay-sur-Orge | 91 | Rue |
| Arques | 62 | Rue |
| Argelès-sur-Mer | 66 | Rue |
| Montigny-en-Gohelle | 62 | Rue |
| Villepreux | 78 | Rue |
| Jeumont | 59 | Rue |
| Oignies | 62 | Rue |
| Grand-Couronne | 76 | Rue |
| Caudebec-lès-Elbeuf | 76 | Rue |
| Varennes-Vauzelles | 58 | Rue |
| Condé-sur-l'Escaut | 59 | Rue |
| Le Portel | 62 | Rue |
| Fosses | 95 | Rue |
| Portes-lès-Valence | 26 | Avenue |
| Portet-sur-Garonne | 31 | Rue |
| Saint-Germain-lès-Arpajon | 91 | Boulevard |
| Saint-Vallier | 71 | Rue |
| Petit-Couronne | 76 | Rue |
| Fleury-Mérogis | 91 | Allée |
| Beaumont-sur-Oise | 95 | Rue |
| Beauchamp | 95 | Avenue |
| Coulounieix-Chamiers | 24 | Rue |
| Saint-Jean-de-Maurienne | 73 | Rue |
| Jarny | 54 | Rue |
| Bougival | 78 | Rue |
| Digoin | 71 | Rue |
| Romagnat | 63 | Rue |
| Wingles | 62 | Rue |
| Jouy-en-Josas | 78 | Rue |
| Le Grau-du-Roi | 30 | Rue |
| Coutras | 33 | Rue |
| Carhaix-Plouguer | 29 | Rue |
| Quincy-sous-Sénart | 91 | Place |
| Nangis | 77 | Allée |
| La Ricamarie | 42 | Impasse |
| Tomblaine | 54 | Rue |
| Seysses | 31 | Avenue |
| Malemort-sur-Corrèze | 19 | Rue |
| Achicourt | 62 | Rue |
| Morières-lès-Avignon | 84 | Rue |
| Perros-Guirec | 22 | Rue |
| Le Plessis-Bouchard | 95 | Rue |
| Trignac | 44 | Rue |
| Pia | 66 | Rue |
| Houplines | 59 | Rue |
| Sausset-les-Pins | 13 | Avenue |
| Vendin-le-Vieil | 62 | Rue |
| Wavrin | 59 | Rue |
| Houdain | 62 | Rue |
| Saint-Maixent-l'École | 79 | Rue |
| Guilers | 29 | Impasse |
| Auby | 59 | Impasse |
| Languidic | 56 | Rue |
| Bourg-Saint-Andéol | 07 | Avenue |
| Gaillon | 27 | Rue |
| Aulnoy-lez-Valenciennes | 59 | Rue |
| Mourenx | 64 | Rue |
| Leforest | 62 | Rue |
| Saint-Pol-de-Léon | 29 | Impasse |
| Liffré | 35 | Rue |
| Saint-Girons | 09 | Rue |
| Gargenville | 78 | Rue |
| Sérignan | 34 | Square |
| Caussade | 82 | Rue |
| Fouquières-lès-Lens | 62 | Rue |
| Corbie | 80 | Rue |
| Roye | 80 | Rue |
| Terrasson-Lavilledieu | 24 | Avenue |
| Boussy-Saint-Antoine | 91 | Rond-point |
| Vaison-la-Romaine | 84 | Avenue |
| Toulouges | 66 | Rue |
| Roost-Warendin | 59 | Rue |
| Bon-Encontre | 47 | Impasse |
| L' Arbresle | 69 | Rue |
| Marsillargues | 34 | Rue |
| Inzinzac-Lochrist | 56 | Rue |
| Le Palais-sur-Vienne | 87 | Rue |
| Malaunay | 76 | Rue |
| Plonéour-Lanvern | 29 | Rue |
| Decize | 58 | Rue |
| Cornebarrieu | 31 | Rue |
| Cornebarrieu | 31 | Impasse |
| Jonage | 69 | Impasse |
| Port-la-Nouvelle | 11 | Avenue |
| Longueau | 80 | Rue |
| Flers-en-Escrebieux | 59 | Rue |
| Colombelles | 14 | Rue |
| Parentis-en-Born | 40 | Rue |
| Gauchy | 02 | Rue |
| Flines-lez-Raches | 59 | Rue |
| Le Boulou | 66 | Rue |
| Fismes | 51 | Rue |
| Bar-sur-Aube | 10 | Rue |
| Vias | 34 | Rue |
| Saint-Pol-sur-Ternoise | 62 | Rue |
| Blendecques | 62 | Rue |
| Ostricourt | 59 | Rue |
| Desvres | 62 | Rue |
| Ablon-sur-Seine | 94 | Rue du Colonel |
| Saint-Martin-des-Champs | 29 | Rue |
| Séméac | 65 | Rue |
| Gourdon | 46 | Rue |
| Noiseau | 94 | Rue |
| Sainte-Menehould | 51 | Rue |
| Cysoing | 59 | Rue |
| Capdenac-Gare | 12 | Rue |
| Dun-sur-Auron | 18 | Rue |
| Sanvignes-les-Mines | 71 | Rue |
| Brionne | 27 | Avenue |
| Brionne | 27 | Impasse |
| Plouhinec | 29 | Rue |
| Annay | 62 | Rue |
| Locmiquélic | 56 | Rue |
| Gravigny | 27 | Rue |
| Lectoure | 32 | Place |
| Cadenet | 84 | Chemin |
| Fouras | 17 | Rue |
| Pont-de-l'Arche | 27 | Rue |
| Langeac | 43 | Rue |
| Notre-Dame-d'Oé | 37 | Rue |
| Moreuil | 80 | Rue |
| Garchizy | 58 | Rue |
| Garchizy | 58 | Allée |
| Varangéville | 54 | Rue |
| Thumeries | 59 | Rue |
| Presles | 95 | Rue |
| Imphy | 58 | Rue |
| Neuville-Saint-Rémy | 59 | Rue |
| Nissan-lez-Enserune | 34 | Impasse |
| Paulhan | 34 | Rue |
| Villemoustaussou | 11 | Rue |
| Villemoustaussou | 11 | Place |
| Quillan | 11 | Rue |
| Fleury d'Aude | 11 | Avenue |
| Bram | 11 | Rue |
| Plougasnou | 29 | Rue |
| Plougasnou | 29 | Impasse |
| Malville | 44 | Rue |
| Blaye-les-Mines | 81 | Rue |
| Ailly-sur-Somme | 80 | Rue |
| Boujan-sur-Libron | 34 | Rue |
| Montfrin | 30 | Rue |
| Lalinde | 24 | Rue |
| Éleu-dit-Leauwette | 62 | Rue |
| Saint-Parres-aux-Tertres | 10 | Rue |
| Villenauxe-la-Grande | 10 | Place |
| Haspres | 59 | Rue |
| Crouy | 02 | Rue |
| Chalindrey | 52 | Rue |
| Châteauneuf-en-Thymerais | 28 | Rue |
| Gréoux-les-Bains | 04 | Avenue |
| Asnières-sur-Oise | 95 | Rue |
| Souchez | 62 | Rue |
| Saint-Saëns | 76 | Rue |
| Piennes | 54 | Rue |
| Nexon | 87 | Rue |
| Aix-en-Othe | 10 | Rue |
| Épinac | 71 | Allée |
| Fressenneville | 80 | Rue |
| Audierne | 29 | Rue |
| Coarraze | 64 | Rue |
| Saint-Yzan-de-Soudiac | 33 | Rue |
| Saint-Benoît-de-Carmaux | 81 | Rue |
| Estagel | 66 | Rue |
| Anizy-le-Château | 02 | Rue |
| Bettancourt-la-Ferrée | 52 | Rue |
| Plougoulm | 29 | Impasse |
| Estissac | 10 | Rue |
| Estissac | 10 | Impasse |
| Menetou-Salon | 18 | Rue |
| Marquette-en-Ostrevant | 59 | Rue |
| Marigny-le-Châtel | 10 | Rue |
| Esquerdes | 62 | Rue |
| Esquerdes | 62 | Impasse |
| Saint-Just-Sauvage | 51 | Rue |
| Aubry-du-Hainaut | 59 | Rue |
| Saint-Sauveur | 80 | Rue |
| Plogoff | 29 | Rue |
| Montredon-des-Corbières | 11 | Rue |
| Pierrefitte-Nestalas | 65 | Rue |
| Ognes | 02 | Rue |
| Marigny-Brizay | 86 | Rue |
| Lugon-et-l'Île-du-Carnay | 33 | Rue |
| Puichéric | 11 | Rue |
| Pépieux | 11 | Impasse |
| Pleurs | 51 | Square |
| Culan | 18 | Impasse |
| Nauroy | 02 | Rue |
| Fontvannes | 10 | Rue |
| Chessy-les-Prés | 10 | Rue |
| Poigny | 77 | Rue |
| Colombier-le-Cardinal | 07 | Rue |
| Lauraët | 32 | Place |
| Soulom | 65 | Rue |

- Street/square count: 282
- County count: 272

=== By region/province ===
- Île-de-France's #1 Paris metropolitan area alone accounts for 127 counties featuring streets/squares Pierre-Brossolette.

=== Walloon county ===
- Seraing, province of Liège, Belgium — Place (Square) Pierre-Brossolette

=== Totals ===
- Street/square count: 490

Obs.: at least 4 streets are double-counted as they border two counties: Montrouge (rank 128) / Malakoff (249), Draveil (284) / Vigneux-sur-seine (305), Villeneuve-le-Roi (503) / Ablon-sur-Seine (2 000), Pierrefitte-Nestalas (7 743) / Soulom (24 935). The count above is rectified accordingly.

Street/square type split
- 11 Boulevards, 47 Avenues, 367 Rues (Streets)
- 13 Allées (Alleys), 21 Impasses (Cul-de-sacs)
- 2 Quais (Wharves), 1 Pont (Bridge)
- 1 Passage, 1 Chemin (Way), 1 Traverse (Shortcut)
- 15 Places (Squares), 5 Squares (Greens)
- 3 Rond-Points (Roundabouts), 1 Carrefour (Junction), 1 Échangeur (Interchange)
- County count: 472
- Urban Area count: 148 out of 771 continental (19%) and 1 out of 21 overseas, totaling 149 out of 792 (18%)
- Département count: 81 out of 95 (continental) and 1 out of 5 (overseas), totaling 82 out of 100.
Unfeatured départements
- Ain (01), Jura (39), Haute-Savoie (74)
- Hautes-Alpes (05), Alpes-Maritimes (06)
- Cantal (15), Lozère (48)
- Corse (2A/B)
- Meuse (55), Moselle (57), Haut-Rhin (67), Vosges (88)
- Orne (61)
- Yonne (89)
- Martinique (971), Guadeloupe (972), Guyane (973), Mayotte (976).
- Region count: 22 (all French regions except non-mainland Corsica, Martinique, Guadeloupe, Guyane and Mayotte)
- Population coverage: 24% (15.8M) of the overall French population (66.1M).

== Schools ==
Primaire = Maternelle (Nursery) + Élémentaire (Elementary) Groupe (scolaire) = Primaire + Collège (Middle) + Lycée (High)
| County | Dépt. | Level |
|---|---|---|
| Paris | 75 | Primaire |
| Reims | 51 | Collège |
| Le Havre | 76 | Collège |
| Le Havre | 76 | Maternelle |
| Villeurbanne | 69 | Lycée |
| Besançon | 25 | Groupe |
| Mulhouse | 68 | Maternelle |
| Argenteuil | 95 | Groupe |
| Roubaix | 59 | Primaire |
| Dunkerque | 59 | Primaire |
| Tourcoing | 59 | Primaire |
| Aubervilliers | 93 | Maternelle |
| Saint-Nazaire | 44 | Groupe |
| Valence | 26 | Groupe |
| Troyes | 10 | Collège |
| Bondy | 93 | Collège |
| Narbonne | 11 | Primaire |
| Charleville-Mézières | 08 | Primaire |
| Sartrouville | 78 | Primaire |
| Bayonne | 64 | Primaire |
| Meudon | 92 | Groupe |
| Wattrelos | 59 | Groupe |
| Melun | 77 | Collège |
| Noisy-le-Sec | 93 | Primaire |
| Nevers | 58 | Groupe |
| Draguignan | 83 | Primaire |
| Tremblay-en-France | 93 | Primaire |
| Le Perreux-sur-Marne | 94 | Primaire |
| Châtenay-Malabry | 92 | Primaire |
| Châtenay-Malabry | 92 | Collège |
| Villeneuve-Saint-Georges | 94 | Collège |
| Liévin | 62 | Primaire |
| Vandoeuvre-lès-Nancy | 54 | Primaire |
| Plaisir | 78 | Primaire |
| Les Mureaux | 78 | Primaire |
| Yerres | 91 | Primaire |
| Savigny-le-Temple | 77 | Groupe |
| Draveil | 91 | Maternelle |
| Le Plessis-Robinson | 92 | Espace |
| Saint-Dizier | 52 | Groupe |
| Montbéliard | 25 | Collège |
| Le Kremlin-Bicêtre | 94 | Lycée |
| Le Kremlin-Bicêtre | 94 | Primaire |
| Oullins | 69 | Collège |
| Les Pavillons-sous-Bois | 93 | Maternelle |
| Riom | 63 | Élémentaire |
| Riom | 63 | Maternelle |
| Ronchin | 59 | Primaire |
| Le Pré-Saint-Gervais | 93 | Primaire |
| Bruz | 35 | Collège |
| Domont | 95 | Primaire |
| Châteaudun | 28 | Maternelle |
| La Chapelle-Saint-Luc | 10 | Collège |
| Castelnaudary | 11 | Maternelle |
| Nogent-le-Rotrou | 28 | Collège |
| Pont-du-Château | 63 | Élémentaire |
| Oignies | 62 | Primaire |
| Grand-Couronne | 76 | Groupe |
| Rouvroy | 62 | Primaire |
| Tomblaine | 54 | Groupe |
| Eu | 76 | Maternelle |
| Noyelles-sous-Lens | 62 | Collège |
| La Penne-sur-Huveaune | 13 | Groupe |
| Garéoult | 83 | Groupe |
| Flines-lez-Raches | 59 | Primaire |
| Le Tréport | 76 | Maternelle |
| Grand-Charmont | 25 | Collège |
| Brionne | 27 | Collège |
| Villiers-sur-Orge | 91 | Maternelle |
| Réhon | 54 | Collège |
| Saint-Parres-aux-Tertres | 10 | Primaire |
| Saint-Génis-des-Fontaines | 66 | Maternelle |
| Mexy | 54 | Collège |
| Esquerdes | 62 | Primaire |
| La Ferté-Chevresis | 02 | Groupe |
| Colombier-le-Cardinal | 07 | Primaire |
| Lauraët | 32 | Primaire |

Count: 76

== Sports, leisure and cultural venues ==
| County | Dépt. | Type |
|---|---|---|
| Lille | 59 | Salle |
| Amiens | 80 | Stade |
| Besançon | 25 | Gymnase |
| Mulhouse | 68 | Gymnase |
| Argenteuil | 95 | Gymnase |
| Saint-Maur-des-Fossés | 94 | Centre sportif |
| Levallois-Perret | 92 | Parc |
| Troyes | 10 | Campus ESC |
| Bobigny | 93 | Espace |
| Wattrelos | 59 | Centre sportif |
| Villeneuve-Saint-Georges | 94 | Stade |
| Vandoeuvre-lès-Nancy | 54 | Gymnase |
| Les Mureaux | 78 | Gymnase |
| Villenave-d'Ornon | 33 | Stade |
| Laon | 02 | Espace |
| Saint-Dizier | 52 | Gymnase |
| Montbéliard | 25 | Gymnase |
| Le Kremlin-Bicêtre | 94 | Espace |
| Armentières | 59 | Stade |
| Armentières | 59 | Foyer |
| Montfermeil | 93 | Foyer |
| Villeneuve-la-Garenne | 92 | Gymnase |
| Coudekerque-Branche | 59 | Salle |
| Château-Thierry | 02 | Gymnase |
| Tomblaine | 54 | Gymnase |
| Valence | 82 | Gymnase |
| Saint-Maur | 60 | Stade |

Count: 27

== Housing estates/projects ==
Cité Brossolette

| County | Dépt. |
|---|---|
| Amiens | 80 |
| Mulhouse | 68 |
| Narbonne | 11 |
| Malakoff | 92 |
| Draveil | 91 |
| Fleury-les-Aubrais | 45 |
| Condé-sur-l'Escaut | 59 |
| Saint-Leu-d'Esserent | 60 |

Count: 8

== Retirement/private condominia ==
Résidence Brossolette

| County | Dépt. |
|---|---|
| Reims | 51 |
| Le Havre | 76 |
| Argenteuil | 95 |
| Roubaix | 59 |
| Dunkerque | 59 |
| Courbevoie | 92 |
| Saint-Quentin | 02 |
| La Roche-sur-Yon | 85 |
| Choisy-le-Roi | 94 |
| Roanne | 42 |
| Draguignan | 83 |
| Viry-Châtillon | 91 |
| Brétigny-sur-Orge | 91 |
| Floirac | 33 |
| Saint-Pierre-des-Corps | 37 |
| Douarnenez | 29 |
| Issoudun | 36 |
| Terrasson-Lavilledieu | 24 |
| Le Trait | 76 |
| Le Quesnoy | 59 |
| Saint-Paul-de-Fenouillet | 66 |
| Châteaudouble | 26 |
| Ansignan | 66 |

Count: 23

== Buildings with memorial plaques ==
| Birthplace | Residence | Family house | Bookstore | Lycée Janson de Sailly |
| 77 bis, rue Michel-Ange; Paris 16, Île-de-France | 123, rue de Grenelle; Paris 07, Île-de-France | Loge-borgne, Chessy-les-Prés; Aube, Champagne-Ardenne | 89, rue de la Pompe; Paris 16, Île-de-France | 108, rue de la Pompe; Paris 16, Île-de-France |

== Memorial steles ==
Saint-Saëns, Seine-Maritime (76), Normandie
Plogoff, Finistère (29), Bretagne

== Harbor ==
Port Brossolette. Memorial (still with pipes) on the left, lighthouse on the right

Port Brossolette

Location: Narbonne-Plage, Narbonne County, Aude (10), Languedoc-Roussillon

The harbor features the:

=== Monument Pierre Brossolette Memorial ===
A unique aeolian memorial where 4 wind pipes would play the 4 chords of Beethoven's 5th symphony, in a reference to the BBC's Radio Londres opening. The pipes have been muted as the desert beach developed postwar into a balneary. The pipes have actually been stolen recently.

=== Port Brossolette Lighthouse ===
Modern-styled concrete lighthouse
