= Gilberte Brossolette =

French journalist and politician (1905–2004)

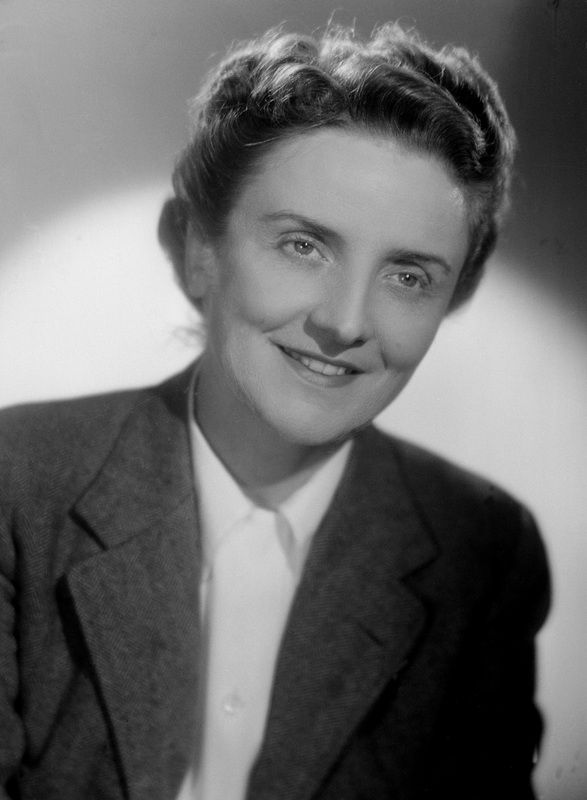
Gilberte Brossolette

Gilberte Brossolette (née Bruel; 27 December 1905 – 18 February 2004) was a French journalist and politician. A member of the French Resistance during the Second World War, she was the wife of journalist and politician Pierre Brossolette (1903-1944), who committed suicide while being tortured by the Gestapo.

== Early life and wartime ==
She was born at 24 rue Vaneau in Paris, the daughter of a bank manager, Gilbert Bruel, and his wife, Marie-Thèrese Deromas. She obtained her baccalaureat from the Institut Sainte-Clotilde in Paris; afterwards, she received a diploma from the Sorbonne and began working as a journalist, employed by papers such as Marianne and Le Populaire. On 20 July 1926 she married Pierre Brossolette, who was three years older than her, and they had two children, Anne and Claude; the latter became a high-ranking civil servant. In 1940, after the fall of France, the couple began holding secret meetings at their home with a view to setting up a Resistance movement. They set up a Russian bookshop at 89 rue de la Pompe, and this became a centre for the Resistance.

In 1942, after their teenage son had been taken in for questioning by the Gestapo, they tried to escape to London, with Gilberte and the children travelling by felucca to Gibraltar and thence to the UK. There she worked for the BBC and for the Commissariat à l'Intérieur de la France libre.

== Post-war and politics ==
In 1946, nominated by the SFIO (French Section of the Workers' International), she was one of 21 women elected to the new Conseil de la République that formed the interim government of France. She later complained that it was difficult for her to speak up for women's rights because her position as Brossolette's widow gave her a different status. She was Vice-President of the Council of the Republic (which replaced the Senate in the Fourth Republic). She continued as a senator until 1959.

Gilberte's biography of her husband, titled Il s’appelait Pierre Brossolette, was first published in 1976. She died, aged 98, at Fontainebleau.

In the 2015 television film Pierre Brossolette ou les passagers de la lune, the role of Gilberte was played by Léa Drucker.
