= Rue de la Pompe =

Street in Paris, France

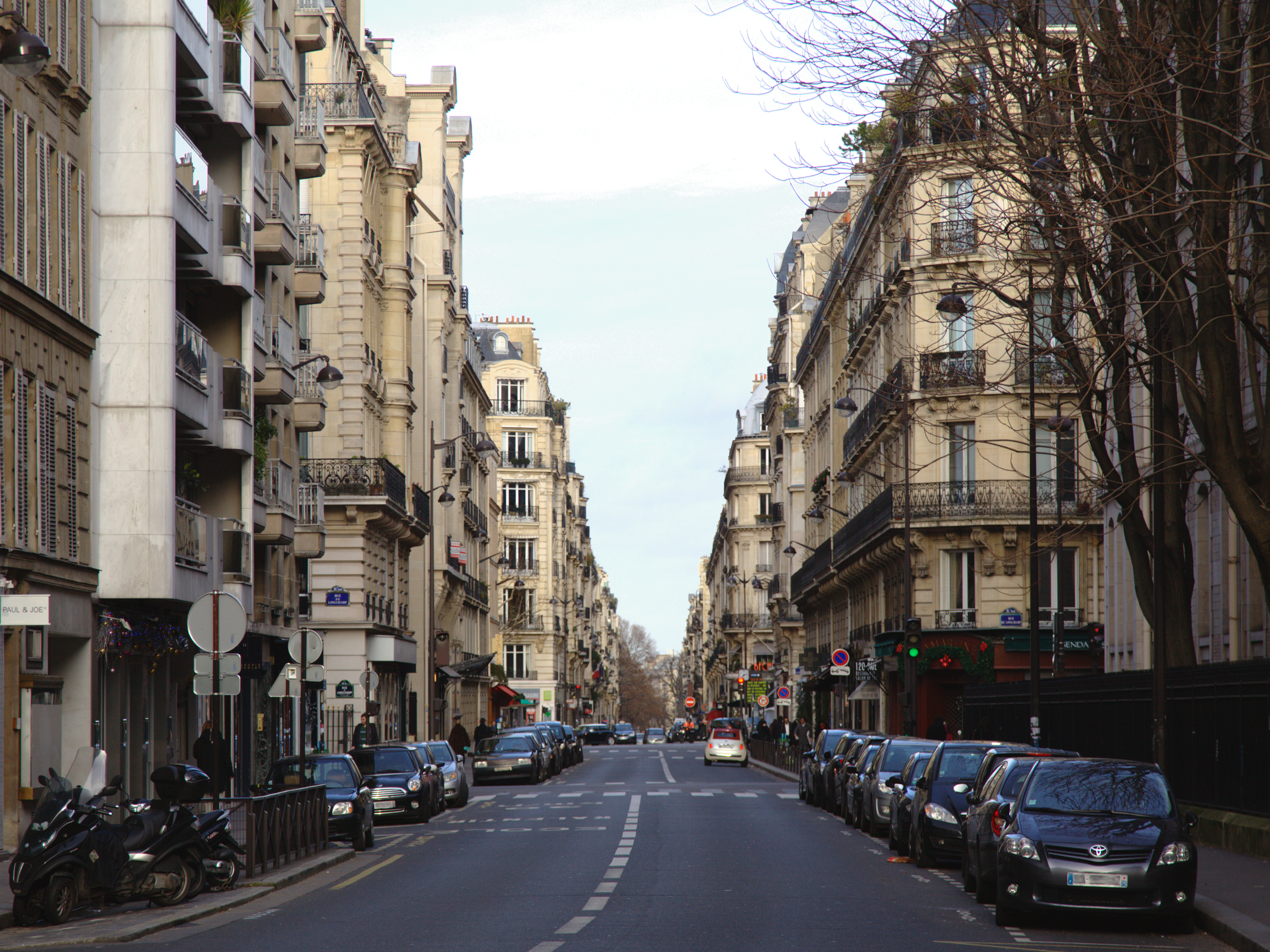
- Rue de la Pompe

- Location within Paris
- Length: 1,690 m (5,540 ft)
- Width: 15 m (49 ft)
- Arrondissement: XVIe 16th
- Quarter: Muette / Porte Dauphine
- Coordinates: 48°52′6″N 2°16′53″E
- From: Avenue Paul Doumer, Paris
- To: Avenue Foch, Paris

Construction
- Completion: Opened around 1730

Rue de la Pompe is a street in Paris, France named for the water pump that served the castle of Muette. Rue de la Pompe is one of the longest streets in the 16th arrondissement. It runs from Avenue Paul Doumer (in the district of Muette) to the Avenue Foch (in the district of Porte Dauphine).

The street was first mentioned in 1730. It runs from south to north and intersected with Rue de Longchamp, which runs from east to west.

== Notable people ==
- The house at no. 1 lies in the southern part of the street and (with view from there) on the left side. Brigitte Bardot spent a part of her childhood there.
- Just a few steps further on the same side of the street – at the place where today is house no. 11 – once stood a country house in which the writer and journalist Jules Janin moved around 1850.
- The writer and caricaturist George du Maurier, who was born on 6 March 1834 in Paris, grew up in the neighborhood. In his first novel Peter Ibbetson (published in 1891), which has some autobiographical tendencies, the author recalls the happy days of childhood in the Rue de la Pompe.
- At what is now a junction of the Rue de la Pompe and the Rue de Siam, between buildings nos. 43 and 45, there used to stand a hotel of unidentified name. In 1877-1880, it was inhabited by Carlos de Borbón, the Carlist claimant to the throne of Spain, his wife Margarita de Bourbon-Parme, their five children and the quasi-court of royal servants, assistants, advisers and secretaries. At that time, the Rue de la Pompe was home to international politics, intrigues and police surveillance. As the presence of the Carlist claimant was increasingly inconvenient for the French authorities, he was made to leave the country in 1880. Some time afterwards, the hotel building was demolished upon construction of the Rue de Siam.
- The American writer Julien Green lived on the left side of the Rue de la Pompe (there where the odd numbers are) and visited Lycée Janson de Sailly at no. 106, just across the street. Because he heard nothing but English at home (his parents were Americans) and nothing but French at school, Green described the Rue de la Pompe as "my Atlantic Ocean".
- Also opposite the mentioned high school lived the French general Joseph Jacques Césaire Joffre for 10 years, as a commemorative plaque on house no. 115 reveals.
- Virginia Oldoini, Countess di Castiglione, an early photographic artist, secret agent, courtesan and mistress to royalty, was bought a small house on the street by Napoleon III in 1857.
- In 1919, an apartment at 115 rue de la Pompe became the home of Irène Némirovsky, author of David Golder, Le Bal, and Suite Francaise, among other novels.
