= Olinger Stories =

1964 collection of fiction by John Updike

Olinger Stories: A Selection
- First edition cover
- Author: John Updike
- Language: English
- Genre: Short stories
- Publisher: Vintage Books
- Publication date: 1964
- Publication place: United States
- Media type: Paperback
- Pages: 191
- OCLC: 231946

Olinger Stories: A Selection is a collection of 11 works of short fiction by John Updike published by Vintage Books in 1964.

The short stories, set in the fictional town of Olinger, Pennsylvania are in large part autobiographical, about a boy growing up in a small town in Pennsylvania, and his experiences as he reaches adolescence and manhood. As presented in Olinger Stories: A Selection the stories match the fictional chronology "which follow a single narrator through his adolescence, marriage, and divorce."

The volume includes stories previously collected in Updike's The Same Door (1959) and Pigeon Feathers and Other Stories (1962).

== Stories ==
All of the selections in this volume originally appeared in The New Yorker. Three of the works were previously collected in The Same Door (1959), and seven had been published in Pigeon Feathers and Other Stories (1962). "In Football Season" had not been previously collected.

- "You'll Never Know, Dear, How Much I Love You" (June 10, 1960)
- "The Alligators" (March 14, 1958)
- "Pigeon Feathers" (April 19, 1961)
- "Friends from Philadelphia" (October 22, 1954)
- "A Sense of Shelter" (January 8, 1960)
- "Flight" (August 14, 1959)
- "The Happiest I've Been" (December 26, 1958)
- "The Persistence of Desire" (January 11, 1959)
- "The Blessed Man of Boston, My Grandmother's Thimble, and Fanning Island" (January 6, 1962)
- "Packed Dirt, Churchgoing, A Dying Cat, A Traded Car" (December 16, 1961)
- "In Football Season" (November 10, 1962)

== Critical assessment ==
"The point, to me, is plain, and is the point, more or less, of these Olinger Stories. We are rewarded unexpectedly. The muddled and inconsequent surface of things now and then parts to yield us a gift."—John Updike in the Foreword to Olinger Stories (1964)

Literary critic Jane Barnes offers this appraisal of Updike's autobiographical works in the collection:

The best Olinger stories provide us with a model of what Updike's recent stories have returned to. In "Flight," "Pigeon Feathers," "A Sense of Shelter," there is more fancy writing than there is in To Far to Go: Maples Stories (1979) or Problems and Other Stories (1979), but in both groups of stories the writing all serves a purpose. In the long run, the unruly impulses in his style seem to have been brought under control by the same principle that liberates the narrator from the past.

== Theme ==
Literary critic Arthur Mizener identifies Updike's literary romanticism as key to his Olinger stories:

Updike is a romantic; for him the instinctive, unselfconscious sense of 'what feels right' is the source of life and the means of salvation...[his] inclination to write almost exclusively about the life of a young man from the small Pennsylvania town he calls Olinger that seems very like the Shillington, Pennsylvania, that John Updike remembers from his own boyhood. Like all American romantics he has an irresistible impulse to go in memory home again in order to find himself.

Appraising Updike's use of autobiography to examine his own personal and artistic development, author and critic Joyce Carol Oates invokes William Faulkner's Requiem for a Nun (1951):

In assembling the short stories and sketches called, simply, Olinger Stories, Updike spoke of having said the "final word" in 1964; by having written The Centaur and transforming Olinger into Olympus, he closed the book on his own adolescence—the past is now a fable, receding, completed. But the past is never completed; it is not even past. It is a continual present.

== Updike on Olinger Stories ==
"Composition, in crystallizing memory, displaces it."—Updike in the Foreword to Olinger Stories (1964)

In the Vintage edition foreword, Updike explains, "Three of these stories are from my collection, The Same Door; seven are from Pigeon Feathers and Other Stories; and one, the last, has not previously been included in any book. All were first printed in The New Yorker. They have been arranged here in the order of the hero's age; in the beginning he is ten, in the middle stories he is an adolescent, in the end he has reached manhood. He wears different names and his circumstances vary, but he is at bottom the same boy, a local boy—this selection could be called A Local Boy. The locality is that of Olinger, Pennsylvania, a small town bounded on the urban side by Alton and on the rural side by Firetown. The name Olinger (pronounced with a long O, a hard g, and the emphasis on the first syllable) was coined, to cap a rebuke, in a story called 'The Alligators'. . . Fiction must recommend itself or remain unrecommended. But if of my stories I had to pick a few to represent me, they would, I suppose, for reasons only partially personal, be these."

== Sources ==
- Barnes, Jane. 1981. John Updike: A Literary Spider from Virginia Quarterly Review 57 no. 1 (Winter 1981) in John Updike: Modern Critical Views, Harold Bloom, editor. pp. 111–125 ISBN 0-87754-717-3
- Begley, Adam. 2014. Updike. HarperCollins Publishers, New York. ISBN 978-0-06189645-3
- Carduff, Christopher. 2013. Ref. 1 Note on the Texts in John Updike: Collected Early Stories. Christopher Carduff, editor. The Library of America. pp. 910–924 ISBN 978-1-59853-251-7
- Detweiler, Robert. 1984. John Updike. Twayne Publishers, G. K. Hall & Co., Boston, Massachusetts. ISBN 0-8057-7429-7 (Paperback).
- Hunt, George W. 1972. Reality, Imagination, and Art: The Significance of John Updike's "Best" Story in Critical Essays on John Updike. G. K. Hall & Co. (1982), William R. Macnaughton editor. pp. 71–75. ISBN 0-8186-8467-4
- Mizener, Arthur. 1964. Memory in Pigeon Feathers excerpted from "The American Hero as High-School Boy: Peter Caldwell" in John Updike: A Collection of Critical Essays. 1979. David Thorburn and Howard Eiland editors. pp. 178–182. ISBN 0-13-937607-0
- Pritchard, Richard H.. 2000. Updike: America's Man of Letters. Steerforth Press, Southroyalton, Vermont.ISBN 1-58642-002-X
- Oates, Joyce Carol. 1975. Updike's American Comedies from Modern Fiction Studies 21, Fall 1975, Purdue Research Foundation, in John Updike: Modern Critical Views, Harold Bloom, editor. pp. 57–68 ISBN 0-87754-717-3
