= Giving Blood =

Work of short fiction by John Updike, 1963

- Short story by John Updike
- Country: United States
- Language: English

Publication
- Published in: The New Yorker
- Publication date: March 29, 1963

"Giving Blood" is a short story by John Updike first appearing in The New Yorker on March 29, 1963. The story was collected in Too Far to Go: The Maples Stories (1979), published by Fawcett Publications.

The story is the second of Updike's Maples saga which follow the lives of characters Richard and Joan Maple.

== Plot ==
The story returns to Updike's fictional couple Richard and Joan Maple, who first appeared in his short story "Snowing in Greenwich Village."

After eight years of marriage, the Maples' relationship is strained nearly to the breaking point. A distant relative of Joan is having major surgery and requires numerous blood transfusions. Joan, who is a veteran blood donor, enlists her husband Richard to accompany her to the hospital and make a contribution. The couple quarrel during the thirty-mile drive.

Richard, who has never given blood, is squeamish. During the procedure, in which they lay side-by-side, head-to-feet and vice versa, Richard begins to imagine the blood-letting as a kind of ritual in which he and Joan are exchanging their essence. The experience renews his affection for his spouse and he ardently declares his love for her after the imagined transfusion. At a nearby pancake diner they enjoy a brief respite from their estrangement. When the couple goes to pay the bill, Richard discovers he has only a dollar in his wallet: the sense of shared sacrifice is shattered. Joan and Richard instantly revert to their former acrimonious relationship.

== Theme ==
Updike reintroduces his readers to the Maples, Richard and Joan, who were newlyweds six years previously in Snowing in Greenwich Village." The Maples have "moved to New England, they now have four children, and their nine years of matrimony have nurtured mistrust and discord."

Updike places the pagan rite of sanguinary sacrifice at the center of the couple's contretemps. Literary critic Robert Detweiler describes this fusing of psychology and myth:

Although the blood-giving is essentially an act of compassion...Updike weighs the description with sacrificial images...Blood and sacrifice have always been closely connected in human religiosity, and that combination, even in the secular setting, allows the story its mythic awareness. The fact that the blood donations occur in a modern clinical setting tends to "demythologize" the situation, and raises the question: "Why are the Maples sacrificing and to whom? - It is a sacrifice of themselves to each other."

Though a brief reproachment occurs while the couple share a pancake breakfast, the blood-letting ordeal ultimately affirms "the enervating effect they have on each other." According to literary critic Jane Barnes, Joan can exert authority over Richard because she holds the socially approved highground as responsible mother and homemaker. This asymmetrical advantage may make her appear "less appealing than her husband" but serves to "contrast her virtue with his irresponsibility."

Literary critic Charles Thomas Samuels detects a false note that appears to emerge between theme and structure:

In "Giving Blood", the precise oscillation of the Maples' love is cut short arbitrarily. In a restaurant where they go to share a moment of camaraderie, born while they donated blood, the husband finds he lacks the money to pay for the affectionate invitation; and the wife, obviously punning, replies, "We'll both pay." Surfeited with cleverness, the reader now disdains the pun implicit in the whole story..."

Samuels attributes this "cleverness" to "the short story form, particularly as practiced in The New Yorker, forcing Updike to impose structural neatness upon material that seem authentic...what could have been a moving glimpse at familiar despair blinds us with a glossy surface to its underlying truth."

Literary critic Robert M. Luscher locates the tragedy of the tale in Richard Maples' "egocentric, insensitive" misapprehension of what his blood donation signifies. Lushcer writes:

Richard unfortunately fails to comprehend that giving blood is a metaphor of giving love: after being relieved of a pint of blood, he states, "I don't really understand this business of giving something away and still somehow having it." foreshadowing his insensitivity to love's dynamic...Richard will continue to stand outside the mysteries of mutual sacrifice that can replenish rather than diminish the marital union.

== Sources ==
- Allen, Mary. 1976. John Updike's Love of "Dull Bovine Beauty" from The Necessary Blankness: Women in Major American Fiction of the Sixties. from University of Illinois Press, 1976 in John Updike: Modern Critical Views, Harold Bloom, editor. pp. 69–95 ISBN 0-87754-717-3
- Barnes, Jane. 1981. John Updike: A Literary Spider from Virginia Quarterly Review 57 no. 1 (Winter 1981) in John Updike: Modern Critical Views, Harold Bloom, editor. pp. 111–125 ISBN 0-87754-717-3
- Begley, Adam. 2014. Updike. HarperCollins Publishers, New York. ISBN 978-0-06189645-3
- Carduff, Christopher. 2013. Ref. 1 Note on the Texts in John Updike: Collected Early Stories. Christopher Carduff, editor. The Library of America. pp. 910–924 ISBN 978-1-59853-251-7
- Detweiler, Robert. 1984. John Updike. Twayne Publishers, G. K. Hall & Co., Boston, Massachusetts. ISBN 0-8057-7429-7 (Paperback).
- Luscher, Robert M. 1993. John Updike: A Study of the Short Fiction. Twayne Publishers, New York. ISBN 0-8057-0850-2
- Pritchard, Richard H. 2000. Updike: America's Man of Letters. Steerforth Press, Southroyalton, Vermont.ISBN 1-58642-002-X
- Samuels, Charles Thomas. 1966. The Music School: A Place of Resonance from The Nation, October 3, 1966 in John Updike: A Collection of Critical Essays. 1979. David Thorburn and Howard Eiland editors. pp. 192–195. ISBN 0-13-937607-0
