= Problems (short story) =

- Short story by John Updike
- Country: United States
- Language: English

Publication
- Published in: The New Yorker
- Publication date: November 3, 1975

"Problems" is a short story by John Updike first appearing in The New Yorker on November 3, 1975. The story was collected in Problems and Other Stories (1979) published by Alfred A. Knopf.

== Plot ==
A is the narrator, his ex-wife is C, and B is the woman with whom A is attempting to forge a redemptive relationship and recover from his recent marriage. These mathematically hypothetical points occur on a two-dimensional plane, but are commingled in each puzzle with purely human attributes as they struggle to cope with personal and financial difficulties.

Problem 1.

While sleeping with lover B, A has a dream about ex-wife C. In it, she is attractively clad in colorful attire and evinces great confidence and vitality. A yearns for her. Troubled by the dream, A feels the apparition conjured from the subconscious is a betrayal of B, who is devoted to A.

Based on the information provided, the reader is asked to calculate which person, B or C, has suffered the greater betrayal by A.

Problem 2.

The narrator A wishes to determine whether enough time is available to wash clothes at a laundromat, and to visit the psychiatrist. The wash cycle is 33 minutes, and the session with the psychiatrist normally lasts 55 minutes. Will A's clothing likely be stolen?

An Extra Credit question is offered: If A washes and dries the clothing after the psychiatric session, will A have time to leave the laundromat to purchase two drinks at a bar? Three drinks?

Problem 3.

The narrator A has four children, two of whom are attending college, and two in private school. Tuition for both college and preparatory school is $11,000 annually. Forty-three percent of A's total income is collected in taxes, and 33% is alimony paid to ex-wife C. A's psychiatrist sessions cost $45, and the cost is $1.10 to do laundry. A's total annual income is n. Rounded to the nearest week, the reader is asked to calculate how much longer A can endure this financial crisis.

Problem 4.

The narrator's ex-wife C is redesigning the driveway of the home won in the divorce settlement. The reader is provided with precise mathematical measurements and ratios for of the size and configuration of the proposed project. The exact shoe size of the contractor is also included.

Based on this detailed information, the reader is asked to explain why A's former spouse is spending gratuitously on such a superfluous project.

Problem 5.

The narrator A is, according to the psychiatrist, making progress emerging from the trauma of the recent marital conflicts with C. Tristan's Law is invoked to explain A's healing process.

The reader is asked to plot the curve of A's recovery.

Problem 6.

The relationship between A and B is blossoming. A's children have procured scholarships to continue their education. The psychiatrist has moved the office to a plush rental conveniently above the laundromat where A washes the clothes. The cost of gravel has plummeted in price. The weather is lovely.

The reader is tasked with locating any inaccuracies concealed in this splendid appraisal of A's good fortune.

== Critical assessment ==
An amusing literary "conceit" biographer Adam Begley registers his approbation for this "charmingly configured six-part math test."

Acknowledging that the story is "unconventional" literary critic Joe Romano notes its "paradigmatic rather than eccentric" elements. Romano writes:

I find "Problems" to be a work of really awesome literary cunning. The cunning, or much of it, is in the sudden darkening of the question: "Which has he more profoundly betrayed?" The words "more profoundly" rescue the passage from a weakening-by-cleverness...They call us back from the play of wit — real wit, for once, like Thackeray's or Pope's — to remind us of the human costliness of an everyday situation.

Literary critic Robert Detweiler ranks "Problems" among Updike's minor efforts:

"Problems" is a slight, witty piece presenting the divorced or separated protagonist's woes with his (ex-)spouse, family, mistress/new wife, and guilt as six mathematical puzzles to be solved. It is a negligible tale that would not, one suspects, have found a publisher...without Updike's reputation to lend it weight.

== Theme ==
"Problems" is an absurdist portrait of a ruined marriage and its aftermath. Formulated as a set of interrelated mathematics problems, the "problems" resemble those found in standard algebra or geometry textbooks. The irony of these "puzzles" is that when it comes to "matters of the heart" they are bound to be quite useless when the characters are reduced to "abstract variables." Updike's conceit is that the laws of geometry can be applied to solve the most painful and intimate of human affairs. Literary critic Robert M. Luscher writes:

Updike adapts the mathematical genre, but undercuts its form: there are not simple answers to A's, since the numerous variables that affect human life...wreak havoc on simple numerical calculations.

Updike returns to the myth medieval lovers Tristan and Iseult (first invoked in his 1966 short story "Four Sides of One Story". "Tristan's Law" is defined in Problem 5: "Appealingness is inversely proportional to attainability."

== Sources ==
- Allen, Mary. 1976. John Updike's Love of "Dull Bovine Beauty" from The Necessary Blankness: Women in Major American Fiction of the Sixties. from University of Illinois Press, 1976 in John Updike: Modern Critical Views, Harold Bloom, editor. pp. 69–95 ISBN 0-87754-717-3
- Barnes, Jane. 1981. John Updike: A Literary Spider from Virginia Quarterly Review 57 no. 1 (Winter 1981) in John Updike: Modern Critical Views, Harold Bloom, editor. pp. 111–125 ISBN 0-87754-717-3
- Begley, Adam. 2014. Updike. HarperCollins Publishers, New York. ISBN 978-0-06189645-3
- Carduff, Christopher. 2013. Ref. 2 Note on the Texts in John Updike: Collected Early Stories. Christopher Carduff, editor. The Library of America. pp. 948–958 ISBN 978-1-59853-252-4
- Detweiler, Robert. 1984. John Updike. Twayne Publishers, G. K. Hall & Co., Boston, Massachusetts. ISBN 0-8057-7429-7 (Paperback).
- Pritchard, Richard H. 2000. Updike: America's Man of Letters. Steerforth Press, Southroyalton, Vermont.ISBN 1-58642-002-X
- Romano, John. 1979. Updike's People. The New York Times, October 28, 1979. https://www.nytimes.com/1979/10/28/archives/updikes-people-updike.html Retrieved 6 March 2023.
- Updike, John. 1979. Problems and Other Stories. Alfred A. Knopf, New York. ISBN 9780394507057
