= The Same Door =

- First edition cover
- Author: John Updike
- Language: English
- Genre: Short story collection
- Publisher: Alfred A. Knopf
- Publication date: 1959
- Publication place: United States
- Media type: Print (hardcover)
- Pages: 241
- ISBN: 9780394747637
- OCLC: OL6272373M

The Same Door is a collection of 16 works of short fiction by John Updike published in 1959 by Alfred A. Knopf. The stories in the volume first appeared separately in The New Yorker, some in a slightly different form than in the collection. The Same Door is Updike's first volume of short stories.

== Stories ==
All the works in this collection first appeared in The New Yorker

- "Friends from Philadelphia" (October 22, 1954)
- "Ace in the Hole" (April 9, 1955)
- "Tomorrow and Tomorrow and So Forth" (April 22, 1955)
- "Dentistry and Doubt" (April 21, 1955)
- "The Kid's Whistling" (November 25, 1955)
- "Toward Evening" (February 3, 1956)
- "Snowing in Greenwich Village" (January 13, 1956)
- "Who Made Yellow Roses Yellow?" (March 30, 1956)
- "Sunday Teasing" (October 5, 1956)
- "His Finest Hour" (June 15, 1956)
- "A Trillion Feet of Gas" (November 30, 1956)
- "Incest" (June 21, 1957)
- "A Gift From the City" (April 4, 1958)
- "Intercession" (August 22, 1958)
- "The Alligators" (March 14, 1958)
- "The Happiest I've Been" (December 26, 1958)

== Critical assessment ==
"The door as a metaphor of communication is physically or figuratively present in all of the stories of the collection. It can function literally [or] it can be the symbolic door between husband and wife, between old friends, or between chance acquaintances...The image of the door, a familiar object of everyday life, is fitting and effective for Updike's purpose: to show that the formative events of one's life occur within the framework of the common, [and] can be redeemed or lost through the quality of one's response to them." - Literary critic Richard Detweiler in John Updike (1984).

Writing about the author's second collection, Pigeon Feathers, in The New York Times Book Review, critic Arthur Mizener wrote of Updike's early achievement as a whole:

John Updike is the most talented writer of his age in America (he is 30 today) and perhaps the most serious. His natural talent is so great that for some time it has been a positive handicap to him—in a small way by exposing him from an early age to a great deal of head-turning praise, in a large way by continually getting out of hand. He has already written five books — two novels (The Poorhouse Fair and Rabbit, Run), a volume of verse (The Carpentered Hen), and two books of stories (The Same Door and this book). Read in chronological order they show clearly the battle that has gone on between his power to dazzle and his serious insight.

Professor Richard H. Rupp offers this measured appraisal of The Same Door:

Though brilliant, the stories of The Same Door do not show the connection between the periphery of experience and the center. The style catches only the outside of things, the shell of the corporate experience we all have being twentieth-century Americans...The inside, the characters' capacity to connect feeling and form, is missing. The range of emotional response is, furthermore, quite limited

== Theme and style ==
"The inside [of] the characters' capacity to connect feeling and form, is missing. The range of emotional response is, furthermore, quite limited...At worst, the style leaves only an empty husk. At best, it reveals characters who are potentially interesting. One does not remember them by name, only collectively..." - Literary critic Richard H. Rupp from "Style in Search of a Center" (1970)

The collection is divided into stories with a boyish protagonist set in either an unnamed small town or Olinger, Pennsylvania—the fictional name Updike gave to his hometown—and stories set mostly in Manhattan, New York and other cities, including London, with a young adult man often at the center.

The stories that comprise the volume were written over a period of five years, composed between November 1955 to April 1957, and possess some degree of consistency in their style and structure. Indeed, half of the stories, which are set in Manhattan, are "remarkably homogeneous." Professor Richard H. Rupp writes: "The most obvious characteristic of Updike's style is his exhaustive exploration of minute physical detail. Even in his first collection, The Same Door, the scene is microscopic."

Literary critic Robert Detweiler locates the central thematic element of the stories in "the unexpected gifts of personal encounter", and quotes Updike's remark regarding the Olinger Stories: "The point, to me, is plain...We are all rewarded unexpectedly." Detwieler acknowledges Updike's debt to James Joyce:

The particular unifying technique is similar to the Joycean epiphany...The Same Door stories, instead of attempting the brutal shock or the psychological shock, concentrate on producing the gradual revelation - the culminating knowledge-plus-emotion that dawns upon the protagonist following his crucial experience...[which] forces the character and reader to pause and then reconsider the entire composition.

== Sources ==
- Begley, Adam. 2014. Updike. HarperCollins publishers, New York. ISBN 978-0-06189645-3
- Carduff, Christopher. 2013. Ref. 1 Note on the Texts in John Updike: Collected Early Stories. Christopher Carduff, editor. The Library of America. pp. 910–924 ISBN 978-1-59853-251-7
- Detweiler, Robert. 1984. John Updike. Twayne Publishers, G. K. Hall & Co., Boston, Massachusetts. ISBN 0-8057-7429-7 (Paperback).
- Mizener, Arthur 1962. Pigeon Feathers. The New York Times Book Review, March 18, 1962.https://archive.nytimes.com/www.nytimes.com/books/97/04/06/lifetimes/updike-r-pigeon2.html Retrieved 2 March 2023.
- Pritchard, Richard H. 2000. Updike: America's Man of Letters. Steerforth Press, Southroyalton, Vermont.ISBN 1-58642-002-X
- Rupp, Richard H.. 1970. "John Updike: Style in Search of a Center", from Celebration in Post-War American Fiction: 1945-1967, University of Miami Press, in John Updike: Modern Critical Views, Harold Bloom, editor. ISBN 0-87754-717-3
