= The Music School (short story) =

1964 short story by John Updike

- Short story by John Updike
- Country: United States
- Language: English

Publication
- Published in: The New Yorker
- Publication date: December 12, 1964

"The Music School" is a short story by John Updike that first appeared in The New Yorker on December 12, 1964. The story was collected in the volume of Updike's fiction The Music School: Short Stories (1966), published by Alfred A. Knopf.

== Plot ==
The narrator, who identifies himself as Alfred Schweigen ("Schweigen" means "silent" in German), is informed by a young seminarian that under the papacy of Pope John, parishioners will be permitted to chew the Eucharistic wafer, rather than letting it dissolve in their mouths. Alfred approves the practicality of this innovation.

That morning Schweigen's wife points out an obituary in the newspaper: an acquaintance of Alfred has been murdered at his home by an unknown assailant in front of his children. Alfred remembers that the man, a computer scientist, was affable and entirely inoffensive. The following morning, while waiting for his eight-year-old daughter to complete her piano lessons at a music school, Alfred struggles to reconcile the change in Church doctrine and the murder of a harmless family man.

Alfred finds the mystery of mastering a musical instrument inspiring, though his own musical studies as a youth were never successful. Simply shuttling his daughter to and from her lessons is a joy to him. He reminds himself that he is performing this duty because his wife is visiting her psychiatrist in an attempt to cope with his own sexual infidelity. Alfred mentally composes literary passages for a novel he intends to write. The narrative he imagines involves a hero (the recently murdered computer programmer), his wife, the man's lover and a psychiatrist. The hero will die at the end. Alfred suddenly breaks off his literary musings. Alfred's psychiatrist has recently inquired as to why he engages in emotional self-flagellation. A vivid memory from Alfred's youth takes shape: He had once made ardent confessions to a priest at a country church, after which he received the Eucharist. The memory momentarily refreshes him.

Alfred's marriage is in shambles, and it occurs to him that it will likely end in divorce. When his daughter rejoins him after completing her music lesson, he is overwhelmed by a sense of profound affection for the child, as well as remorse for his failures as a husband.

== Theme and style ==
The "music school" refers not only to the pedagogic training of children in the musical arts but, according to literary critic Robert Detweiler, "a pathos-ridden paradigm of the exercises their elders practice in learning life's notes...Music School is life." Detwieler points out that the story possesses neither a discernible plot nor a linear narrative, yet conveys "the inevitable sorrows and losses of daily life...":

How then are the motifs organized to produce artistic integrity? For one...the narrator suggests that a "coda" is fitting to conclude the piece, hinting at a direct musical analogy. One can observe thematic variations, contrapuntal effects and polyphonic-like manipulation of motifs that strengthen the parallel to musical composition.

Literary critic Charles Thomas Samuels contrasts Updike's earlier epistolary treatment involving a youthful divinity student in "Lifeguard" with that of the seminarian in "The Music School.":

"Lifeguard", in Pigeon Feathers and Other Stories (1962), was the consideration of ambiguities of secular life through the reverie of a divinity student who is earning tuition on the beach. "The Music School" treats the same theme with greater poise. Though more audacious than the earlier tale, which managed to turn bathers into theological terms, this story does not mock the speaker's pain with a brazen virtuosity."

"Updike's techniques of dramatic monologues, startling juxtapositions, and metaphoric richness coalesce in "The Music School" to create a complex amalgam of religion, murder, computer programming, infidelity, music and innocence." —Literary critic Robert M. Luscher in John Updike: A Study of the Short Fiction (1993).

Biographer William H. Pritchard offers the following passage from "The Music School" to illustrate Updike's autobiographical declaration concerning the state of his own marriage:

My friends are like me. We are all pilgrims, faltering towards divorce. Some get no further than mutual confession, which becomes an addition, and exhausts them. Some move on, into violent quarrels and physical blows, and succumb to sexual excitement. A few make it to the psychiatrists. A very few get as far as the lawyers.

Quoting the same passage, biographer Adam Begley considers "The Music School" a "helpless overview" of marital relationships in American suburbia, a confession of Updike's own guilt-ridden domestic affairs.

== Sources ==
- Begley, Adam. 2014. Updike. HarperCollins Publishers, New York. ISBN 978-0-06189645-3
- Carduff, Christopher. 2013. Ref. 1 Note on the Texts in John Updike: Collected Early Stories. Christopher Carduff, editor. The Library of America. pp. 910–924 ISBN 978-1-59853-251-7
- Detweiler, Robert. 1984. John Updike. Twayne Publishers, G. K. Hall & Co., Boston, Massachusetts. ISBN 0-8057-7429-7 (Paperback).
- Luscher, Robert M. 1993. John Updike: A Study of the Short Fiction. Twayne Publishers, New York. ISBN 0-8057-0850-2
- Pritchard, Richard H. 2000. Updike: America's Man of Letters. Steerforth Press, Southroyalton, Vermont.ISBN 1-58642-002-X
- Olster, Stacey. 2006. The Cambridge Companion to John Updike. Cambridge University Press, Cambridge. ISBN 0-521-60730-2 (paperback)
- Samuels, Charles Thomas. 1966. The Music School: A Place of Resonance from The Nation, October 3, 1966 in John Updike: A Collection of Critical Essays. 1979. David Thorburn and Howard Eiland editors. pp. 192–195. ISBN 0-13-937607-0
