= Packed Dirt, Churchgoing, A Dying Cat, A Traded Car =

- Short story by John Updike
- Country: United States
- Language: English

Publication
- Published in: The New Yorker
- Publication date: December 16, 1961

"Packed Dirt, Churchgoing, A Dying Cat, A Traded Car" is a short story by John Updike, first appearing in The New Yorker on December 16, 1961. The story was collected in Pigeon Feathers and Other Stories (1962) by Alfred A. Knopf.

== Plot ==
The story is composed of four interrelated vignettes, appearing in a sequence indicated by the story's title. The narrator is David Kern, Updike's autobiographical alter ego.

"Packed Dirt"

The story opens with the narrator at home with his family, observing the house next door: recently sold, it is undergoing demolition by heavy equipment. Massive earth movers digging a new foundation contrasts sharply with the narrator's childhood memories of the smooth footpaths that the children unconsciously created around the neighborhood in their play. He finds the memory of this simple human impact on the earth reassuring.

"Churchgoing"

The narrative turns to Kern's memories when, as a boy, he and his father served as ushers at the Wednesday night services at the Lutheran church. He recalls fondly the warmth and security of the church interior, and the gatherings as a simple and undemanding democratic experience. Another congregational experience comes to mind, when he visited a church on an island in the Caribbean, a former British colony, most of whose parishioners are descendants of slaves. The tiresome sermon contrasts with the natural beauty of the surrounding landscape.

"A Dying Cat"

The narrator relates an episode that occurred during his wife's delivery of their first child while the couple was sojourning in England. At the request of the hospital staff, he takes a walk around town while his wife is in labor. In the darkness of a winter evening, he finds a cat in the street, recently struck by an automobile. Mortally injured, the animal quietly endures its suffering. The narrator gently moves the cat - he assumes it is a female - to a hedge so it can die in peace. As the cat has a collar, he leaves a brief note with his address under the unresponsive animal. When he phones the hospital, he is congratulated: his spouse has delivered a healthy girl. The next morning he returns to the hedge to discover the cat and the note is gone. No one ever responds by mail to his message.

"A Traded Car"

Back in New England, the couple enjoys driving their 1955 Ford, but after six years, though sentimentally attached to the vehicle, they arrange to purchase a newer model. Shortly before the car is traded in, the narrator has a mutual flirtation with an attractive woman at a local dance which he attends with his wife. Sexually aroused, he and his intoxicated wife make passionate love after they arrive home, but not before putting their four young children to bed. He begins to suffer a crisis of faith when he contemplates Jesus' warning that a married man who merely lusts in thought after another woman is guilty of adultery. As such, he begins to doubt his own salvation.

On his birthday, the narrator receives a phone call from his mother who lives in Pennsylvania. Rather than a birthday greeting, she informs him his father is seriously ill due to heart disease. The narrator is encouraged by the news: he is certain that his father will mount a successful personal struggle against death.

He takes his Ford for a final drive to visit his parents. On the way, he picks up a young sailor who shares the driving. The youth is in love with a girl, but her parents object to the marriage. The narrator urges him to pursue the relationship and assures him the parents will ultimately consent.

When the narrator arrives in Alton and meets his mother, she expresses concern that her husband lacks sufficient religious faith: he had always believed in the divinity of Jesus, but never in a Supreme Being. At the hospital, the narrator discovers that his father's character has been a little changed by his illness. He reminds him he once said, "no matter what happens, it'll be a new experience." They begin to reminisce about the adventures they had shared in unreliable vehicles. The narrator begins to silently panic at the thought of losing his father. When mother and son prepare to leave, the dying man assures the narrator that he has been "a good son, and a good father." With this, the father realizes he is no longer the center of his son's existence.

== Theme ==
Literary critic Arthur Mizener remarks on the thematic unity of the story:

In it the narrator brings together a series of ostensibly unconnected recollections...The packed dirt, the dying cat, the churchgoing, the car have become, each in its different way, a part of some heroism or some moment of communion: they have been mastered; they are intrinsically blessed. That is all that ever matters for Updike about any object or event.

With respect to the "Churchgoing" section, Updike suggests that secular ceremonies in America provide rituals that "impose at least a provisional order" that were formerly provided by religious traditions that was fading in his generation. The good order that the narrator draws from church services is shaken in the vignette "A Dying Cat." Critic William H. Pritchard writes: "[S]ometimes the thematic nugget...is almost too visible as with the section "A Dying Cat," a slight incident in which David...comes across a dying cat to which he ministers, but whose dying body admonishes him to Run on home. It feels a shade rigged."

Updike provides the trigger that introduces the central theme of the story in the vignette "A Traded Car." Biographer Adam Begley writes: "[A] highly charged flirtation with another woman sparks a religious crisis not dissimilar to the one he suffered the first time he appeared as Updike's alter ego, as a teenager in "Pigeon Feathers."

"A Traded Car", draws an equivalence between trading in the family automobile and the passing of the narrator's father. Literary critic Richard H. Rupp, praising Updike's style, cites the last paragraph from the story in full:

Any day now we'll trade it in; we are just waiting for the phone call. I know how it will be. My father traded in many cars. It happens so cleanly, before you expect it. He would drive off up the dirt road exactly as usual and when he returned the car would be new, and the old was gone, gone, utterly dissolved back into the mineral world from which it was conjured, dismissed without a blessing, a kiss, a testament, or any ceremony of farewell. We in America need ceremonies, is I suppose, sailor, the point of what I have written.

Commenting on "the longest and most impressive of the sections" of the story, "A Traded Car", Pritchard writes:

The confluence of illicit sexual desire, terror of human life without God, and thoughts of death...this moment in "A Traded Car" is an important one in Updike's career, since its the first fusion of concerns—the child, the adult, the believer, the lover— will remain central...

== Sources ==
- Begley, Adam. 2014. Updike. HarperCollins Publishers, New York. ISBN 978-0-06189645-3
- Detweiler, Robert. 1984. John Updike. Twayne Publishers, G. K. Hall & Co., Boston, Massachusetts. ISBN 0-8057-7429-7 (Paperback).
- Novak, Michael. 1963. "Updike's Quest for Liturgy" in John Updike: A Collection of Critical Essays. 1979. David Thorburn and Howard Eiland, editors. pp. 183–191. ISBN 0-13-937607-0
- Mizener, Arthur. 1964. "Memory in Pigeon Feathers" excerpted from "The American Hero as High-School Boy: Peter Caldwell" in John Updike: A Collection of Critical Essays. 1979. David Thorburn and Howard Eiland, editors. pp. 178–182. ISBN 0-13-937607-0
- Olster, Stacey. 2006. The Cambridge Companion to John Updike. Cambridge University Press, Cambridge. ISBN 0-521-60730-2 (paperback)
- Pritchard, Richard H. 2000. Updike: America's Man of Letters. Steerforth Press, Southroyalton, Vermont.ISBN 1-58642-002-X
