= Problems and Other Stories =

John Updike short-fiction collection (1979)

- First edition cover
- Author: John Updike
- Cover artist: John Updike
- Language: English
- Genre: Short story collection
- Publisher: Alfred A. Knopf
- Publication date: October 1979
- Publication place: United States
- Media type: Print (hardcover)
- Pages: 260
- ISBN: 0-394-50705-3
- OCLC: 791480
- Dewey Decimal: 813'.5"4
- LC Class: PS3571.P4

Problems and Other Stories is a collection of 23 works of short fiction by John Updike. The volume was published in 1979 by Alfred A. Knopf. The stories were first carried in literary journals, 17 of which appeared in The New Yorker. Problems and Other Stories is one of two collections of Updike's short stories that appeared in 1979 (the other is Too Far to Go: The Maples Stories).

== Stories ==
The stories first appeared in The New Yorker, unless otherwise noted.

- "Commercial" (June 10, 1972)
- "Minutes of the Last Meeting" (Audience, July–August 1972)
- "Believers" (Harper's Magazine, July 1972)
- "The Gun Shop" (November 25, 1972)
- "How to Love America and Leave It at the Same Time" (August 19, 1972)
- "Nevada" (Playboy, January 1974)
- "Son" (April 21, 1973)
- "Daughter, Last Glimpses of" (November 5, 1973)
- "Ethiopia" (January 14, 1974)
- "Transaction" (Oui, March 1974)
- "Separating" (June 23, 1975)
- "Augustine's Concubine" (Atlantic Monthly, April 1975)
- "The Man Who Loved Extinct Animals" (July 21, 1975)
- "Problems" (November 3, 1975)
- "Domestic Life in America" (December 13, 1976)
- "Love Song, for a Moog Synthesizer" (June 14, 1974)
- "From the Journal of a Leper" (July 19, 1976)
- "Here Come the Maples" (October 11, 1976)
- "The Fairy Godfathers" (November 8, 1976)
- "The Faint" (Playboy, May 1978)
- "The Egg Race" (June 13, 1977)
- "Guilt-Gems" (September 19, 1977)
- "Atlantises" (November 13, 1978)

== Background ==
The collection's title reflects Updike's opening remark in his Author's Note: "Seven years since my last short-story collection? There must have been problems." Biographer Adam Begley notes the autobiographical antecedents to the collection:

Half the stories in Problems were written after Updike separated from Mary [Mary Pennington Updike], and in all but one of those we read about the guilt and regret of a man whose first marriage has failed or is failing. His guilt is aggravated by the pain and confusion his 'dereliction" has inflicted on various children."

Problems and Other Stories is conspicuous in that "children assume the foreground" in several of the tales that track the "gulf [that widens] between them and their separating parents and sometimes erupts with suppressed anguish", according to critic Robert M. Luscher.

The geometric diagram that appears on the cover of the 1979 first edition was designed by Updike, and is meant to provide a schematic representation of the relationship between the three characters in the first of the six stories.

== Critical assessment ==
The New York Times literary critic John Romano comments on Updike's style in Problems and Other Stories: "...Updike's own silent insistence that his style is the center, maybe the substance, of his art. Although most of the time it's bound tightly to the work of describing the world, it also has the means and the inclination to call attention to itself. Every few pages we are struck by what might be called a 'writer's word,' such as claxon or cruciform. Or, more often, we come upon a metaphor of astonishing deftness and efficiency; so deft and efficient, paradoxically, that it's liable to distract us. But there's more to Updike's metaphors than this."

Literary scholar David Thorburn offers this appraisal of the collection:

In these stories, Updike's powers of observation and description are deployed with a master's conciseness, the fruit of twenty years at the steady practice of his craft. Snatches of conversation intended as neutral civilities, and rendered with a perfect fidelity to the rhythms actual speech, put in touch with tides of resentment and pain and intimate longing which the speakers themselves had imagined themselves to be free. The most ordinary spaces and objects, cataloged with flamboyant accuracy, are seen to be full of meaning, mute totems of the humanly significant.

Literary critic Jane Barnes bestows high praise upon the volume:

As a collection, Problems and Other Stories is marked by the author's growth as a writer, but the best stories in the book are best because they are about the subject which is most crucial to Updike. In those, form and feeling are one; the problem raised and the problem solved matter because the human heart is at stake; the drama is literally tied to it like a creature punished in the flames.

== Theme ==
The stories in the collection were written between 1971 and 1978, a period in which Updike separated then divorced his first wife Mary Pennington Updike. Literary critic Richard Detweiler notes that "many (but by no means all) of the twenty-three stories concern couples in various stages of separation, or in the aftermath of a divorce, often with children figuring prominently in the action."

"Problems and Other Stories is most often a retrospective contemplation of divorce, meticulous atomizing of personal guilt, and a cumulative and meditative sense of loss." —Literary critic Kathleen Verduin in Critical Essays on John Updike (1982).

Critic Jane Barnes notes that the former hometown settings to which Updike's protagonists had retreated in earlier stories are no longer reliable as sanctuaries:

To a great extent, the tension derives from the conflict between the illusions fueling the adult from the past and the demands made on him as a parent and husband in the present. His childhood hopes, desires, dreams are frustrated by family life, and Updike's narrator is constantly turning back - less and less, however, to rediscover his childhood's glory."

Barnes adds: "The narrator's slow coming to terms with his unhappiness in the marriage, his falling in love...his nerve to act (to divorce and remarry)—all these occur because of revisions of his understanding of the past." Updike closes the collection with a story that is emblematic of his theme, "Atlantises", in which frogmen in training practice emergency escapes to avoid painful or deadly embolisms. The instructor serves to "calm their panic, and show them the discipline of survival.'"

In a chapter entitled "The Geometry of Guilt", literary critic Robert M. Luscher identifies Updike's central theme in Problems and Other Stories: his middle-aged protagonist's consignment to a purgatory where they "engage in an ongoing struggle with guilt."

Divorce carries a profound burden of guilt for these troubled protagonists...Whatever epiphanies they now experience are now tinged with guilt or irony, driving home with a poignant sting that suffering may ennoble but does not purge...Their souls may grow calluses, but such hard-earned protection may be part of the problem—not the solution—if the cost is lost sensitivity to the sad beauties inherent in life's waning.

== Sources ==
- Barnes, Jane. 1981. John Updike: A Literary Spider from Virginia Quarterly Review 57 no. 1 (Winter 1981) in John Updike: Modern Critical Views, Harold Bloom, editor. pp. 111–125 ISBN 0-87754-717-3
- Begley, Adam. 2014. Updike. HarperCollins Publishers, New York. ISBN 978-0-06189645-3
- Carduff, Christopher. 2013. Ref. 1 Note on the Texts in John Updike: Collected Early Stories. Christopher Carduff, editor. The Library of America. pp. 910–924 ISBN 978-1-59853-251-7
- Detweiler, Robert. 1984. John Updike. Twayne Publishers, G. K. Hall & Co., Boston, Massachusetts. ISBN 0-8057-7429-7 (Paperback).
- Luscher, Robert M. 1993. John Updike: A Study of the Short Fiction. Twayne Publishers, New York. ISBN 0-8057-0850-2
- Pritchard, Richard H. 2000. Updike: America's Man of Letters. Steerforth Press, Southroyalton, Vermont.ISBN 1-58642-002-X
- Romano, John. 1979. Updike's People. The New York Times, October 28, 1979. https://www.nytimes.com/1979/10/28/archives/updikes-people-updike.html Retrieved 6 March 2023.
- Thorburn, David. 1979. Introduction: John Updike: A Collection of Critical Essays. Prentice-Hall, Englewood, NJ. ISBN 0-13-937607-0
- Updike, John. 1979. Problems and Other Stories. Alfred A. Knopf, New York. ISBN 0-394-50705-3
