= A Trillion Feet of Gas =

Short story by John Updike

- Short story by John Updike
- Country: United States
- Language: English

Publication
- Published in: The New Yorker
- Publication date: December 8, 1956

"A Trillion Feet of Gas" is a short story by John Updike first appearing in The New Yorker on December 8, 1956. The story was collected The Same Door (1959), published by Alfred A. Knopf.

== Plot ==
An American couple, Luke and Liz Forrest, want to introduce a visiting English friend to an authentic American billionaire. They take him to a dinner party where he meets a Texan businessman, John Born. The Forrests and their friend, Donald King, and Mr. Born discuss the recent re-election of President Dwight David Eisenhower and a gas bill that the President vetoed earlier in the year.

Mr. Born claims that he is in possession of a trillion feet of natural gas that he has no incentive to sell unless some similar bill is passed in the next session of Congress and signed. On their way home, the Forrests and Mr. King are a bit confused. They wonder how many zeros are in a trillion — American and British conventions on that differed — and whether he meant a trillion feet (305 million km) spread out along a pipeline or a trillion cubic feet (28 km^{3}).

== Background ==
The history that provoked Updike to write a story about such a conversation has been largely forgotten in the intervening half century, but at that time he was able to assume most of his readers would know that on February 6, 1956, Senator Francis Case of South Dakota had said on the U.S. Senate floor that a lobbyist for a natural gas company had left $2500 in cash in an envelope waiting for him, presumably in exchange for his vote on the deregulatory bill. This set off an investigation by the Federal Bureau of Investigation and forced creation of a select Senate committee to look into lobbying practices. The deregulation bill passed anyway, although President Eisenhower vetoed it on February 17.

"A Trillion Feet of Gas" is one of eight short stories Updike wrote between 1955 and 1957, which were collected in The Same Door (1959) after appearing individually in The New Yorker. These stories are all set in Manhattan and most of them, including "A Trillion Feet of Gas" examine the struggles of young married couples who must reconcile their provincial sensibilities with the demands of a cosmopolitan urban life.

The couple in this tale, Luke and Liz Forrest "are modeled more or less exactly" on Updike and his wife Mary Pennington Updike.

Updike was under the influence of contemporary authors J. D. Salinger, whose work he discovered while attending Harvard University, and John Cheever whose works he had read in The New Yorker. Indeed, the title of "A Trillion Feet of Gas" is "Salingeresque" according to literary critic William H. Pritchard.

== Sources ==
- Begley, Adam. 2014. Updike. HarperCollins Publishers, New York. ISBN 978-0-06189645-3
- Detweiler, Robert. 1984. John Updike. Twayne Publishers, G. K. Hall & Co., Boston, Massachusetts. ISBN 0-8057-7429-7 (Paperback).
- Pritchard, William H. 2000. Updike: America's Man of Letters. Steerforth Press, Southroyalton, Vermont.ISBN 1-58642-002-X
- French, Sean (February 4, 1995). "Beware the Perilous Pitfalls of Brightly Purple Prose". The Age (Melbourne, Australia).
