= The Egg Race =

- Short story by John Updike
- Country: United States
- Language: English

Publication
- Published in: The New Yorker
- Publication date: June 13, 1977

"The Egg Race" is a short story by John Updike which first appeared in The New Yorker on June 13, 1977. The story was collected in Problems and Other Stories (1979) by Alfred A. Knopf.

== Plot ==
The story opens as the narrator, a man named Ferguson (an Updike autobiographical figure), is reminiscing about festivities in his boyhood community that included an "egg-and-spoon race" for local children.

Ferguson, an archaeologist, recalls the general outpouring of the community's grief at the passing of his father, a retired school teacher. This contrasts with Ferguson's indifference to the loss, despite the father-son close companionship which has characterized their relationship. Ferguson is ashamed that, unlike his father, who remained faithful to his wife, he has been an adulterer who divorced his wife to marry his mistress. As such, Ferguson had postponed the divorce—a painful fall from grace —until after the passing of his father.

Ferguson relates the impressions of a vivid dream he's had concerning his father, now dead for five years. The two are engaged in one of their perennial automobile-related misadventures which in life had been gratifying to both of them.

A number of vignettes follow: a trip with his 17-year-old son to visit prospective colleges; a visit to the Smithsonian, where Ferguson is dismayed that some historical tableau depict scenes that closely resemble the artifacts of his own childhood; and finally an uncomfortable call at a hospital where his former university professor lay dying. An invitation arrives, addressed to "Fergy" encouraging him to attend his 25th High School reunion, class of '52. He goes to the alcohol-fueled event alone. There he encounters his former classmate since kindergarten Linda, who had married her high school sweetheart and remained in the hometown. She, unlike the other attendees, has preserved her youthful and buxom figure. Linda's unshakable complacency contrasts with Ferguson's guilt over his adultery, divorce and remarriage. A classmate approaches Ferguson, a former devoted pupil to his father, and declares to Ferguson that the son has not measured up to the father. Ferguson admits as much.

The following morning, hungover from the reunion festivities, Ferguson takes a sentimental walk through his hometown of Hayesville, invoking scenes from his childhood. He recognizes and is recognized by the aging population of the village. He walks through the old playground, imagining he will discover shards of broken egg shells from a long-past Egg Race - a race, he admits, he had never won: indeed, he routinely had sacrificed a chance to win the race in order to obsessively preserve the integrity of the egg.

Back with his wife and children, Ferguson reads that his former professor has died. One of his children awakes with a sore throat and is kept home from school, ministered to by his mother. Ferguson inventories the comfort food delivered to the child: fresh-squeezed orange juice; Rice Krispies; sugar and cream; warm toast cut into strips. The bed is strewn with books and paraphernalia to amuse the child. Ferguson reflects that a community that can provide these provisions is precious, like a fragile egg that must not be dropped from a spoon.

== Theme ==
The vocation of Updike's protagonist, an archaeologist who studies ancient civilizations in Iraq, serves as a metaphor for Ferguson's cautious efforts to find the key to the present in his own past. Literary critic Richard Detweiler comments on his quest:

The memory of the egg race...stands out as a reminder of how conservative he has been. He never won the race as a child, intent on saving the egg in its spoon, and throughout his life he has avoided risks in the interest of safety. The shards of ancient cultures that the archaeologist uncovers, and the shattered shells that result when one ventures out from safety merge, then, in Updike's imagery, and these symbols of death and birth come together in the concept of crisis.

Detwieler adds that "Ferguson's ritual trip into his literal past, his memory, and his unconscious may help him to meet the critical juncture of middle age, and mature into equanimity regarding death's inevitability." Ferguson's determination to achieve independence from his parents comes with a price. Literary critic Jane Barnes notes that "though he has made his way out of the charmed circle he shared with his parents, they have clearly left their mark on the shape he finally assumes." His freedom leads to disaffection from his mother and sense of having failed to live up to the moral standards of his father. Barnes writes:

I recently read in an essay by Freud that a very long labor will cause the imprint of the pelvic bone to be impressed on the baby's skull; I think of a better analogy to describe the influence of [Ferguson's] parents and their marriage on the final form of the narrator's character.

The narrator's "idealized Protestant father", to whom he compares himself unfavorably with respect to his own domestic affairs, serves as a "internalized restraining presence". Ferguson, who has divorced and remarried only after his father's death, was loath to violate the sacraments during the elder's lifetime.

Literary critic Kathleen Verduin identifies the nature of the patriarch's moral authority:

...the Updike father is scarcely god-like or triumphant in the eyes of the world. Yet it is clear that for Updike this apparent contradiction of the father's link with divinity is in reality its essence: victim but conqueror, the father figure is a kind of saint whose existence affirms the paradoxes of Christianity."

Verduin adds that, despite the father's "idiosyncrasies" his presence persists in the narrator's self-awareness, acting as "guardian and moral authority, and an almost iconical representation of order and meaning in the universe."

Biographer William H. Pritchard declares that this "not-well-known" work of short fiction in Updike's oeuvre "is "a watershed moment in a literary career, insofar as it translates its protagonist to a different, slightly remote and detached plane, from which not just his past but his present and future experiences are regarded."

== Sources ==
- Barnes, Jane. 1981. John Updike: A Literary Spider from Virginia Quarterly Review 57 no. 1 (Winter 1981) in John Updike: Modern Critical Views, Harold Bloom, editor. pp. 111–125 ISBN 0-87754-717-3
- Begley, Adam. 2014. Updike. HarperCollins Publishers, New York. ISBN 978-0-06189645-3
- Carduff, Christopher. 2013. Ref. 2 Note on the Texts in John Updike: Collected Early Stories. Christopher Carduff, editor. The Library of America. pp. 948–958 ISBN 978-1-59853-252-4
- Detweiler, Robert. 1984. John Updike. Twayne Publishers, G. K. Hall & Co., Boston, Massachusetts. ISBN 0-8057-7429-7 (Paperback).
- Pritchard, Richard H. 2000. Updike: America's Man of Letters. Steerforth Press, Southroyalton, Vermont.ISBN 1-58642-002-X
- Updike, John. 1979. "The Egg Race" in Problems and Other Stories (1979). Alfred A. Knopf, New York. ISBN 0-394-50705-3
- Verduin, Kathleen. 1982. "Fatherly Presences: John Updike's Place in a Protestant Tradition." in Critical Essays on John Updike. G. K. Hall & Co. (1982), William R. Macnaughton, editor. pp. 254–268. ISBN 0-8186-8467-4
