= The Music School =

The Music School may refer to:

- The Music School (short story), a 1964 short story by John Updike
- The Music School (short story collection), a 1966 short story collection by John Updike

== See also ==
- Music school
