= Pigeon Feathers =

Pigeon Feathers may refer to:

- Pigeon Feathers (short story), a short story by John Updike
- Pigeon Feathers and Other Stories, a collection of short fiction by John Updike
