= Who Made Yellow Roses Yellow? =

- Short story by John Updike
- Country: United States
- Language: English

Publication
- Published in: The New Yorker
- Publication date: April 7, 1956

"Who Made Yellow Roses Yellow?" is a work of short fiction by the novelist John Updike, first appearing in The New Yorker on April 7, 1956. It was published in his 1959 collection The Same Door.

== Plot ==
As the story begins, Fred Platt, the focal character, is about to place a telephone call to a college friend he hasn't seen in years. Platt, as the opening sentence indicates, comes from "old money"—is three generations removed from its accumulation. He wants to acquire a job without the contaminating hand of his father's connections.

Accordingly, he calls his old friend Thomas Clayton, a man of merely petty-bourgeois heritage, who has achieved genuine prosperity: He has risen to executive status in the advertising wing of an immense chemical company. Platt feels that Clayton owes him a favor because while at university he had facilitated his membership in an elite campus journal, the Quaff. The staff had disparaged the socially inept Clayton, but were compelled to acknowledge his talent as a cartoonist. The drama in the story consists of Fred's horror at Clayton's gauche, new-money ways, a horror that he with some effort suppresses in the interest of asking Clayton for a position with the firm: Platt's sense of entitlement sharpens his expectations of success.

Though recognizing his former school-mate's cosmopolitan sophistication, Clayton's business acumen and hard-headed self-interest insulate him from Fred's overtures. Platt departs empty-handed, but leaves Clayton with a parting-shot in school-book French to demonstrate his social superiority.

== Background ==
Biographer Adam Begley reports the autobiographical antecedents to "Who Made Yellow Roses Yellow?": Clayton Thomas Clayton is modeled closely on Updike himself. At the Harvard Lampoon, Updike as a freshman gained entre to the journal based on the quality of his cartoon submissions, and like Clayton, became the president of the journal in his senior year.

Updike was introduced to the work of J. D. Salinger through a literature professor, who read aloud Salinger's stories published in The New Yorker. According to Adam Begley, Updike's "Who Made the Roses Yellow" was influenced by "Just Before the War with the Eskimos" (1948).

== Style ==
Literary critic Richard H. Rupp offers this passage from "Who Made Yellow Roses Yellow?" to illustrate Updike's concern with "minute physical detail" as a means of revealing his subject's character, a hallmark of his early style. Updike here is describing the character Fred Platt:

He was perfect: the medium-short dry-combed hair, the unimpeachable brown shirt, the buttonless collar, the genially dragged vowels, the little edges of efficiency bracing consonants...the not smoking, the tucked-in chin and the attendant uplook of the boyishly lucid eyes, and the skin allergy that placed on the flank of each jaw a constellation of red dots.

Rupp notes that this "microscopic" cataloging of personal features and behavior functions to "establish the writer's authority: the story itself is secondary...We remember the voice far longer than the story." Rupp reminds us that the name "Platt" is German for "flat" or "low." Critic Robert Detwieler comments on Platt as a social type:

Fred Platt is one of Updike's thoroughly unpleasant character creations but he is also pathetic. Caught in the web of his own perverse personality, he cannot really meet anyone else on honest terms; and he seems doomed to isolation in his shallow social superiority."

== Sources ==
- Begley, Adam. 2014. Updike. HarperCollins Publishers, New York. ISBN 978-0-06189645-3
- Detweiler, Robert. 1984. John Updike. Twayne Publishers, G. K. Hall & Co., Boston, Massachusetts. ISBN 0-8057-7429-7 (Paperback).
- Rupp, Richard H.. 1970. John Updike: Style in Search of a Center (from Celebration in Post-War American Fiction: 1945-1967, University of Miami Press) in John Updike: Modern Critical Views, Harold Bloom, editor. ISBN 0-87754-717-3
