= A&P (short story) =

- Short story by John Updike
- Country: United States
- Language: English

Publication
- Published in: The New Yorker
- Publication date: July 22, 1961

"A&P" is a tragicomic work of short fiction by John Updike which first appeared in the July 22, 1961 issue of The New Yorker. The story was collected in Pigeon Feathers in 1961, published by Alfred A. Knopf. The work is frequently included in anthologies.

== Plot ==
Sammy, a teenage clerk in an A&P grocery, is working the cash register on a hot summer day when three pretty young women about his age enter, in bathing suits and bare feet, to buy snacks. Sammy gawks at the girls; he imagines details about the girls based on their appearance alone, impressions that, to his surprise, are shaken when the leader of the trio, an enchantingly gorgeous beauty he dubs "Queenie", speaks in a voice unlike that which he had created in his imagination.

Lengel, the prudish store manager, feels the girls are not dressed appropriately for a supermarket, and admonishes them, telling them they must have their shoulders covered next time, which Sammy believes unnecessarily embarrasses them.

Offended by the manager's disregard for their dignity, Sammy ceremoniously removes his store apron and bow tie and resigns on the spot, despite the mention by the manager that he believes Sammy's resignation is for rash reasons and to reconsider. Lengel also reminds Sammy he knows Sammy's parents and he ought not do anything that would embarrass them socially. Sammy then leaves the store, seemingly in expectation of some display of affection or appreciation from the young women involved, only to find that they've already left, apparently oblivious to his presence. Sammy then feels a sense of dread, reflecting on "how hard the world was going to be to me hereafter".

== Reception ==
M. Gilbert Porter called the titular A&P in Updike's story "the common denominator of middle-class suburbia, an appropriate symbol for [the] mass ethic of a consumer-conditioned society". According to Porter, when the main character chooses to rebel against the A&P he also rebels against this consumer-conditioned society, and in so doing he "has chosen to live honestly and meaningfully". Conversely, William Peden called the story "deftly narrated nonsense ... which contains nothing more significant than a checking clerk's interest in three girls in bathing suits."

== Theme ==
Sammy, the teenage cashier, "a martyr for beauty", stalks off the job after his manager ejects the bathing suit-clad girls from the store, in particular "Queenie", the prettiest of the three. Literary critic Mary Allen comments on Updike's conception of the ideal female:

Beauty is far and away the most desirable trait in a woman, perhaps the only essential one. It is not necessarily associated with physical attributes. A woman in Updike may be remembered as pretty because of the fondness with which the love scenes are portrayed... In fact, a case can be made that homeliness of a sort that makes a woman soft and vulnerable is itself an attraction for Updike men.

Allen adds: "The very sight of women gives a kind of grace to existence for Updike men. A young grocery checker in 'A&P' grows faint with delight when three girls in bathing suits come into the market. The loveliest girl, whose straps hang charmingly off her white shoulders, comes through his line and pays her bill with a dollar she produces from the top of her bathing suit."

Updike's 19-year-old protagonist is quickly disabused as to the wisdom of his recklessness on behalf of the girls. Literary critic Richard Detweiler writes:

The undertone of sorrow resides in the depressing sight that awaits Sammy outside the supermarket: the girls for whom he has gallantly sacrificed his job have disappeared; in their place is a young married woman yelling at her spoiled children, a much commoner refrain to the heady tunes of wishful American romance.

== Character profiles ==
=== Lengel ===
Manager of the local A&P, Lengel is a man who spends most of his days behind the door marked "Manager". Entering the story near the end, he represents the system: management, policy, decency, and the way things are. But he is not a one-dimensional character. He has known Sammy's parents for a long time, and he tells Sammy that he should, at least for his parents' sake, not quit his job in such a dramatic, knee-jerk way. He seems truly concerned even while he feels the need to enforce store policy.

=== Queenie ===
"Queenie" is the name Sammy gives to the gorgeous girl who leads her two friends through the grocery store in their bathing suits. He has never seen her before but immediately becomes infatuated with her. He comments on her regal and tantalizing appearance. He clearly admires how her inappropriate attire defies convention. When Lengel chastises the girls for their attire, Queenie, who Sammy imagines lives in an upper-middle-class world of backyard swimming pools and fancy appetizers, becomes "sore now that she remembers her place, a place from which the crowd that runs the A&P must look pretty crummy". Sammy becomes indignant at Lengel's treatment of the girls and tries to help them save face by quitting his job. But Queenie appears not to notice and leaves the store promptly, diminishing the impact of Sammy's impulsive gesture.

=== Plaid and Big Tall Goony Goony ===
These are the nicknames Sammy gives Queenie's friends, who are somewhat uneasier about their attire. Plaid is a plump, pretty girl in a plaid two-piece bathing suit; Big Tall Goony Goony is cynically observed by Sammy to have the sort of striking features other girls pretend to admire because they know she's no real competition to them (although he concedes that she's not bad-looking on the whole).

=== Sammy ===
Sammy's name is not revealed to the reader until the end of the story, even though he is the first-person narrator of the story. He is a checkout clerk at an A&P supermarket. His language indicates that, at age 19, he is both cynical and romantic. He notes, for instance, that there are "about twenty-seven-old freeloaders" working on a sewer main up the street, and he wonders what the "bum" in "baggy gray pants" could possibly do with "four giant cans of pineapple juice". Yet when Queenie approaches him at the checkout, Sammy notes that "with a prim look she lifts a folded dollar bill out of the hollow at the center of her nubbled pink top. ... Really, I thought that was so cute." He vacillates back and forth between these extremes of opinion during the story, calling some of his customers "houseslaves in pin curlers", yet he is sensitive enough that when Lengel makes Queenie blush, he feels "scrunchy inside". At the end of the story, he quits his job in an effort to be a hero to the girls and as a way of rebelling against a strict society. In a sudden moment of insight—an epiphany—he realizes "how hard the world was going to be to [him] hereafter" if he refuses to follow conventional paths.

=== Stokesie ===
Stokesie is a 22-year-old white man who is married with two children. He works with Sammy at the A&P checkout, and is the only other store checker mentioned. He is a minor character in the story, but seems to be representative of ritualism; Stokesie seems to be a medium between the temperaments of Sammy and Lengel. He shares Sammy's askew views to some extent, but does have ambition that one day he can take over the store when Lengel dies or retires, but thinks it is probably out of the question until 1990 when there is Soviet takeover of the United States. (Ironically, 1990 in real time being one year after the fall of the Berlin Wall and the USSR was on its last gasp of being a superpower.) However, Stokesie does his job faithfully each day in order to provide for his wife and kids. Like Sammy, he also observes the girls in the store with interest, although not to the point he is fully distracted. Other customers have been filling up Stokesie's aisle when the girls come to make their purchase, leaving Sammy free. He is a glimpse of what Sammy's future might be like; Stokesie's family "is the only difference" between them, Sammy comments.

== In other media ==
=== Film ===
In 1996, a short film directed by Bruce Schwartz was made, based on the short story. It starred Sean Hayes as Sammy and Amy Smart as Queenie in their first official movie roles, later shown on Spike TV.

==== Cast ====
- Sean Hayes as Sammy
- Randy Oglesby as Lengel
- Jeramy Guillory as Stokes
- Amy Smart as Queenie
- Andrea Lyn as Striking
- Liz Sheridan as Hi-Ho Lady

== Sources ==
- Allen, Mary. 1976. John Updike's Love of "Dull Bovine Beauty" from The Necessary Blankness: Women in Major American Fiction of the Sixties. from University of Illinois Press, 1976 in John Updike: Modern Critical Views, Harold Bloom, editor. pp. 69–95 ISBN 0-87754-717-3
- Begley, Adam. 2014. Updike. HarperCollins Publishers, New York. ISBN 978-0-06189645-3
- Detweiler, Robert. 1984. John Updike. Twayne Publishers, G. K. Hall & Co., Boston, Massachusetts. ISBN 0-8057-7429-7 (paperback).
