= The Music School (short story collection) =

Short stories by John Updike

The Music School: Short Stories
- First edition cover
- Author: John Updike
- Language: English
- Genre: Short story collection
- Publisher: Alfred A. Knopf
- Publication date: 1966
- Publication place: United States
- Media type: Print (hardcover)
- Pages: 272
- ISBN: 978-0394437279
- OCLC: 1150851608

The Music School: Short Stories is a collection of 20 works of short fiction by John Updike, first appearing individually in The New Yorker. The stories were collected in this volume by Alfred A. Knopf in 1966.

== Stories ==
The stories in the collection are listed chronological order with respect to their appearance in The New Yorker:

- "In Football Season" (November 10, 1962)
- "The Indian" (August 17, 1963)
- "Giving Blood" (April 6, 1963)
- "A Madman" (December 22, 1962)
- "Leaves" (November 14, 1964)
- "The Stare" (April 3, 1965)
- "Avec La Bebe-Sitter" (January 1, 1966)
- "Twin Beds in Rome" (February 8, 1964)
- "Four Sides of One Story" (October 9, 1965)
- "The Morning" (July 18, 1964)
- "At a Bar in Charlotte Amalie" (January 11, 1964)
- "The Christian Roommates" (April 4, 1964)
- "My Lover Has Dirty Fingernails" (July 17, 1965)
- "Harv is Plowing Now" (April 23, 1966)
- "The Music School" (December 12, 1964)
- "The Rescue" (May 9, 1964)
- "The Dark" (October 31, 1964)
- "The Bulgarian Poetess" (March 13, 1965)
- "The Family Meadow" (July 24, 1965)
- "The Hermit" (February 20, 1965)

== Reception ==
Literary critic Charles Thomas Samuels offers this praise for the collection: "The Music School is Updike's best collection [to date], with superior examples of every sort of story that he writes."

== Theme and style ==
Literary critic George W. Hunt remarks upon the nexus of style and theme that characterize the story's in the volume:

The Music School collection holds a distinctive place in the Updike corpus because it contains several stories that, in addition to more familiar Updike themes, especially engage the issues of artistic self-consciousness and the act of composition itself."

The often idyllic world of Updike's youth and the largesse of "unexpected gifts" as portrayed in Updike's Olinger stories are no longer available to the protagonists of The Music School. Now in their adulthood, they struggle to regain a measure of their former optimism through "epiphanic moments" while plagued by "romantic discord" and "a sense of perplexity." Abandoning the rural settings of Olinger (a literary creation of Updike's hometown in Shillington, Pennsylvania), The Music School tales take place in suburban Tarbox, "the fictional equivalent of Ipswich, Massachusetts."

Literary critic Robert M. Luscher notes: "divorce becomes the volume's dominant metaphor, with separations occurring from spouses, youth, the society, and life itself." In terms of technique, Updike exhibits a broad versatility of style in his depictions of irretrievable youth: Standard linear narrative ("The Rescue"), meditative mode ("Leaves"), historical sketch ("The Indian") ala Hawthorne, and epistolary ("Four Sides of One Story").

== Sources ==
- Hunt, George W. 1979. Reality, Imagination and Art: The Significance of John Updike's "Best" Story in Critical Essays on John Updike. 1982. pp. 207–216. William R. Macnaughton, editor. G. K. Hall & Co., Boston, Massasschuts. ISBN 0-8186-8467-4
- Luscher, Robert M. 1993. John Updike: A Study of the Short Fiction. Twayne Publishers, New York. ISBN 978-0805708509
- Samuels, Charles Thomas. 1966. The Music School: A Place of Resonance from The Nation, October 3, 1966 in John Updike: A Collection of Critical Essays. 1979. David Thorburn and Howard Eiland editors. pp. 192–195. ISBN 0-13-937607-0
