= Wife-Wooing =

Work of short fiction by John Updike, 1960

- Short story by John Updike
- Country: United States
- Language: English

Publication
- Published in: The New Yorker
- Publication date: March 12, 1960

"Wife-Wooing" is a short story by John Updike which first appeared in The New Yorker on March 12, 1960. The story was collected in Too Far to Go: The Maples Stories (1979), published by Fawcett Publications.

== Plot ==
The story, like Updike's Rabbit, Run (1960), is written in the present tense, employing the second-person singular "you" when the protagonist addresses his wife. "Wife-Wooing" is part of the Maples family saga, first collected in Too Far to Go: The Maples Stories (1979) No plot develops, and though unnamed, the married couple are Joan and Richard Maple.

The story opens in what appears to be an interlude of domestic bliss; a husband and wife are enjoying a simple repast in front of a warm fireplace with their three young children. The husband reflects that they have been married for seven years. He is still moved by his wife's body, and pleasurably contemplates that her thighs resemble those of a female character in James Joyce's novel Ulysses. He notes to himself how immeasurably more difficult it is to court a prospective wife than to merely seduce an inexperienced girl.

The children quarrel over their meal that the father has picked up at a near-by fast-food outlet, but they are indulged by their parents. The husband draws strength from his wife and yearns for sexual intimacy. He reminds her of their honeymoon and the consummation of marriage. His idealized memory of their love-making that night is not shared by the wife. After putting the children to bed, she retires to the bedroom and falls asleep before he can initiate sex. In the morning, the husband has lost his carnal desires. In the clamor of the demands by their children at breakfast, his wife appears physically repellant. The husband departs the domain of domesticity and arrives at work where the imperatives of earning money are paramount. He returns home still preoccupied with his job. His wife administers his dinner as a perfunctory exercise. The children are sent to bed.

The husband roams about smoking cigarettes that evening, still distracted by his job. In a daze, he prepares to go to bed. His wife enters the bedroom and bestows upon him a sweet and seductive kiss.

== Style and Theme ==
Literary critic Richard H. Rupp comments on the "baroque style" evident in "Wife-Wooing."

In "Wife-Wooing" Updike is experimenting with [an] unreliable narrator [who] takes himself and his situation far too seriously, indulging his capacity to formulate sense impressions. The narrator in "Wife-Wooing" conveys "the import of his experience in a way that is simply silly"

Biographer Adam Begley notes Updike's expression of thwarted sexual desire in "one of the cruelest" passages of the story depicting the mother of the narrator's three young children:

In the morning, to my relief, you are ugly. Monday's wan breakfast light bleaches you blotchedly, drains the goodness from your thickness, makes the bathrobe a limp stained tube flapping disconsolately, exposing sallow decolletage (with accent). The skin between your breasts is a sad yellow. I feast with the coffee on your drabness, every wrinkle and sickly tint a relief and a revenge. The children yammer. The toaster sticks. Seven years have worn this woman.

Updike's application of lyricism to the mundane aspects of a housewife's existence is stylistically part of the "wooing." Literary critic Mary Allen discerns a measure of egalitarianism in the husband's endeavors to woo his wife:

The wife, who may be distasteful where marriage is a system of constraints, is not, however, essentially a distasteful concept to Updike men. A wife is the comfort they seek. Their truest entrapment is never more to their wives than to themselves, and even a possessive wife can be a liberating force.

Allen adds: "Most couples in Updike's fiction continue to work for some unnameable goal which makes their lives if not extraordinary, at least worth living."

Literary critic Jane Barnes recognized the generally positive characteristics with which Updike endows the narrator:

In 'Wife-Wooing', the narrator's job is a composite of all men's work...Like all other narrators, Richard Maple's primary task is not business, but self-awareness. More than that, his first responsibility is to know the meaning of life; what he should do, how he should live it."

Literary critic Richard Detweiler comments on the preternatural nature of the domestic scene Updike offers in the "rose window" passage:

The Medieval image of the rose window, symbol of both purity and defloration, supports the religious nature of the man's total commitment to the marriage event. Through intercourse, through the rose window, the male sees into the design of himself and his world in a new sense...Whether she is in prehistory or sitting bare-thighed before a suburban hearth, she is fertility, domesticity, security. In the woman the man has his fulfillment, and to "woo" her is to court the elusive components of his own identity.

Detwieler adds: "When, at the end, the wife comes to her husband in bed eager for sexual love, it is a gift he must recognize and accept as such; it is as old as human history yet as new and unique as the individuality as experiencing can make it."

== Sources ==
- Allen, Mary. 1976. John Updike's Love of "Dull Bovine Beauty from The Necessary Blankness: Women in Major American Fiction of the Sixties. from University of Illinois Press, 1976 in John Updike: Modern Critical Views, Harold Bloom, editor. pp. 69–95 ISBN 0-87754-717-3
- Barnes, Jane. 1981. John Updike: A Literary Spider from Virginia Quarterly Review 57 no. 1 (Winter 1981) in John Updike: Modern Critical Views, Harold Bloom, editor. pp. 111–125 ISBN 0-87754-717-3
- Begley, Adam. 2014. Updike. HarperCollins Publishers, New York. ISBN 978-0-06189645-3
- Carduff, Christopher. 2013. Ref. 1 Note on the Texts in John Updike: Collected Early Stories. Christopher Carduff, editor. The Library of America. pp. 910–924 ISBN 978-1-59853-251-7
- Detweiler, Robert. 1984. John Updike. Twayne Publishers, G. K. Hall & Co., Boston, Massachusetts. ISBN 0-8057-7429-7 (Paperback).
- Luscher, Robert M. 1993. John Updike: A Study of the Short Fiction. Twayne Publishers, New York. ISBN 0-8057-0850-2
- Macnaughton, William R. 1982. Introduction to Critical Essays on John Updike. G. K. Hall & Co., Boston, Massasschuts. ISBN 0-8186-8467-4
- Rupp, Richard H.. 1970. John Updike: Style in Search of a Center, from Celebration in Post-War American Fiction: 1945–1967, University of Miami Press, in John Updike: Modern Critical Views, Harold Bloom, editor. ISBN 0-87754-717-3
- Pritchard, Richard H. 2000. Updike: America's Man of Letters. Steerforth Press, Southroyalton, Vermont.ISBN 1-58642-002-X
