= The Happiest I've Been =

Work of short fiction by John Updike, 1959

- Short story by John Updike
- Country: United States
- Language: English

Publication
- Published in: The New Yorker
- Publication date: January 3, 1959

"The Happiest I've Been" is a short story by John Updike, first appearing in The New Yorker on January 3, 1959. The story was collected in The Same Door (1959) published by Alfred A. Knopf.

== Plot ==
The narrator, John Nordholm, a 19-year-old college sophomore, has returned to his childhood home in Olinger (a fictional rural town in Pennsylvania) for Christmas vacation. John and his former high school classmate Neil Hovey arrange to drive to Chicago to visit girlfriends for New Year's Eve. John bids farewell to his parents. Rather than proceeding directly on their journey, the youths decide to first attend a local party that evening in Olinger that involves a measure of alcohol consumption, dancing and carousing.

The lively gathering of John's high school friends continues late into the night and the boys pair off with two of the local girls, Margaret Lento and a girlfriend (unnamed). In the wee hours of the morning the boys deliver the girls to Margaret's home in a nearby town. Margaret invites the group in to have coffee. Neil and Margaret's friend neck in the darkened house. John and Margaret chat, sharing experiences they've had with the people they've grown up with. After a tender kiss, she falls asleep in his arms.

At sunrise the youths depart together for Chicago, taking turns sleeping and driving on the anticipated 17-hour trip. John is filled with a tremendous sense of optimism, anticipation and pride as he embarks upon his adulthood.

== Theme ==
"The tale is stylistically different from the other tales in The Same Door (1959). It is essentially plotless and has the form of a reminiscence, a series of smoothly connected vignettes that one would guess to be transposed autobiography—Updike's personally experienced Shillington, Pennsylvania into the fictive Olinger of 1951..."The Happiest I've Been" broadens into a modern maturation ritual...that does not simply dress up the old forms of twentieth-century art but also adds a new interpretive dimension. The season, the party, and the trip embody and symbolize the transitional nature of the experience that introduces a new stage of maturity...it is an emphatic moment of separation from family and home and the start of the independent journey through adult life."—Robert Detweiler in John Updike (1984)

The "bittersweet" events Updike describes in "The Happiest I've Been" concern the final hours of his boyhood and his first awareness of himself as an adult. Biographer Adam Begley notes the author's willingness "to indulge liberally in nostalgia, to replay the past, frame by frame, and wring every last drop out of reminiscence—a technique Updike had mastered as early as 1958 in "The Happiest I've Been."

Detweiler identifies those moments that comprise the happiest of the narrator's life in the expressions of trust he has elicited from others: "There was knowing that twice since midnight a person had trusted me enough to fall asleep beside me." Detwieler writes:

The nostalgia for an irretrievable carefree past is balanced by a pride in the assumed responsibility of adult relationships. One trusts one's sexual being, one's safety, with the other person and there is joy in accepting the burden of that faith.

Literary critic William H. Pritchard considers the final passages from "The Happiest I've Been" among "the best pieces of writing to be found anywhere in Updike." Pritchard quotes Updike's own appraisal of the story: "I had a sensation of breaking through, as if through a thin sheet of restraining glass, to material, to truth, previously locked up."

Literary critic Robert M. Luscher the moment of narrator's transition to adulthood:

While John Nordholm has developed a new awareness of time's inevitable diminishment, he has, in compensation, received trust, the mark of increasing responsibility. With satisfaction both ahead and behind him, he conveys an overall sense of a smooth passage undergone by a renewed person who has traveled for the last time through the same door, but tries to keep it open to memory's access.

== Sources ==
- Begley, Adam. 2014. Updike. HarperCollins Publishers, New York. ISBN 978-0-06189645-3
- Carduff, Christopher. 2013. Ref. 1 Note on the Texts in John Updike: Collected Early Stories. Christopher Carduff, editor. The Library of America. pp. 910–924 ISBN 978-1-59853-251-7
- Detweiler, Robert. 1984. John Updike. Twayne Publishers, G. K. Hall & Co., Boston, Massachusetts. ISBN 0-8057-7429-7 (Paperback).
- Luscher, Robert M. 1993. John Updike: A Study of the Short Fiction. Twayne Publishers, New York. ISBN 0-8057-0850-2
- Pritchard, Richard H.. 2000. Updike: America's Man of Letters. Steerforth Press, Southroyalton, Vermont.ISBN 1-58642-002-X
- Searles, George J. 1982. The Poorhouse Fair: Updike's Thesis Statement in Critical Essays on John Updike. G. K. Hall & Co. (1982), [William R. Macnaughton, editor. pp. 231–236. ISBN 0-8186-8467-4
