= Ace in the Hole =

Ace in the Hole may refer to:

== Music ==
- Ace in the Hole (album), an album by Elvin Bishop
- Ace in the Hole Band, the backup band for George Strait
- "Ace in the Hole" (Cole Porter song)
- "Ace in the Hole" (George Strait song) written by Dennis Adkins
- "Ace in the Hole", a song by Paul Simon on the album One-Trick Pony
- "Ace in the Hole", a song composed in 1909 by James Dempsey and George Mitchell, and recorded by many artists including Bobby Darin and Johnny Mercer on Two of a Kind

== Other uses ==
- Ace in the Hole (1942 film), an animated cartoon short subject
- Ace in the Hole (1951 film), a film starring Kirk Douglas
- "Ace in the Hole" (short story), a 1955 story by John Updike
- Ace in the Hole (anthology), edited by George R. R. Martin
- Ace in the Hole, a 2009 sitcom pilot starring Adam Carolla
- Having an ace as a hole card in poker
- That Old Ace in the Hole, a 2002 novel by Annie Proulx
