= Pigeon Feathers and Other Stories =

1962 short story collection by John Updike

- First edition
- Author: John Updike
- Cover artist: S. Neil Fujita
- Language: English
- Genre: Short story collection
- Publisher: Alfred A. Knopf
- Publication date: 1962
- Publication place: United States
- Pages: 296
- ISBN: 978-0394440569

Pigeon Feathers and Other Stories is a collection of 19 works of short fiction by John Updike. The volume is Updike's second collection of short stories, published by Alfred A. Knopf in 1962. It includes the stories "Wife-Wooing" and "A&P", which have both been anthologized.

Pigeon Feathers and Other Stories was a finalist for the National Book Award in 1962. "A&P" and the title story, "Pigeon Feathers", were both adapted into films (see below).

== Stories ==
All the stories were first published in The New Yorker unless otherwise indicated:

- "Walter Briggs" (April 11, 1959; titled "Vergil Moss")
- "The Persistence of Desire" (July 11, 1959)
- "Still Life" (January 24, 1959)
- "A Sense of Shelter" (January 16, 1960)
- "Flight" (August 14, 1959)
- "Should Wizard Hit Mommy?" (June 13, 1959)
- "Dear Alexandros" (October 31, 1959)
- "Wife-Wooing" (March 12, 1960)
- "Pigeon Feathers" (April 19, 1961)
- "Home" (July 9, 1960)
- "Archangel" (Big Table Quarterly, 1960)
- "You'll Never Know, Dear, How Much I Love You" (June 18, 1960)
- "The Astronomer" (April 1, 1961)
- "A&P" (July 22, 1961)
- "The Doctor's Wife" (February 11, 1961)
- "Lifeguard" (June 17, 1961)
- "The Crow in the Woods" (Transatlantic Review, Winter 1961)
- "The Blessed Man of Boston, My Grandmother's Thimble, and Fanning Island" (January 13, 1962)
- "Packed Dirt, Churchgoing, A Dying Cat, A Traded Car" (December 16, 1961)

== Reception ==
"'Pigeon Feathers' demonstrates a masterful command of language and technique. In only his second collection, Updike is sufficiently comfortable with the short story form to experiment with a variety of narrative strategies, especially variations on first-person narration such as the epistolary story, the lyrical meditation, and the [literary] montage...the lyrical meditation is especially suited to Updike's talent for capturing the detailed texture of experience."—Literary critic Robert M. Luscher in John Updike: A Study of the Short Fiction.

Literary editor William R. Macnaughton reports that Pigeon Feathers and Other Stories received "generally popular reviews" upon its release. Time magazine registered some doubts as to the seriousness of Updike's literature: "This dedicated 29-year-old man of letters says very little, and says it very well...The impressions left are of risks untaken, words too fondly tasted, and a security of skill that approaches smugness."

Literary critic Arthur Mizener, writing in the New York Times Book Review offered this fulsome praise for the collection: "It is a demonstration of how the most gifted writer of his generation is coming to maturity; it shows that Mr. Updike's fine verbal talent...is beginning to serve his deepest insight..." Mizener cautions that Updike, taken to embellishing his fiction with "radically irreverent decorative charm" risks "losing track of something he started to express in {Pigeon Feathers and Other Stories] - that is, his sense of life itself - that is far more important than elegance."

Biographer Adam Begley notes that Pigeon Feathers, as well as Vladimir Nabokov's Pale Fire, each were finalists for the 1962 National Book Award.

== Style and theme ==
The stories in Pigeon Feathers are autobiographical in nature and introduce Updike's "alter ego" David Kern. The works are set largely in the fictional town of Olinger, which resemble Updike's childhood home of Shillington, Pennsylvania. Arthur Mizener notes "Mr. Updike's almost irresistible impulse to go home again in memory to find himself." Robert M. Luscher observes that the stories express an ambivalence for the past:

[W]hile some of the younger characters flee from the past, those who have crossed or lingered on the threshold between adolescence and maturity flee toward the past, wrestling with its details and yearning to recapture its mysteries.

The stories in Pigeon Feathers provide evidence of Updike's increasing technical mastery in linking his character's internal narratives with their external experience, both past and present. Literary critic Richard H. Rupp describes Updike's use of "montage" to effect this connection:

Pigeon Feathers shows some improvement in the attempt to make some internal connection...Most impressive is Updike's montage technique...Three stories especially demonstrate the effect [viz. "Home", "The Blessed Man" and "Packed Dirt"]. These three stories stress a common theme, revealed through a common technique: We need ceremonies, for they keep us in touch with the familial past, the only true source of strength and identity.

Rupp adds: "On the whole the experiments in Pigeon Feathers meet with mixed success. Updike writes best of simple people; but in this collection he does not always close the gap between style and emotion, between outside and inside."

Commenting on the underlying themes in the collection, literary critic Robert Detweiler observes that "In Pigeon Feathers...the accent shifts to the individual in greater spiritual isolation and in a struggle to come to terms with the universe itself, even though the context is the familiar round of ordinary events...these stories emphasize...the existence and awareness of design in all human events and conditions."

== Film adaptations ==
The short story "Pigeon Feathers" was adapted into a film and presented in 1988 on the Public Broadcasting American Playhouse series. It was directed by Sharron Miller and starred Christopher Collet, Caroline McWilliams, Jeffrey DeMunn, Lenka Peterson, and Boyd Gaines. It tells the story of David, a young man who has a crisis of faith as he struggles with his belief in life after death.

In 1996, the short story "A&P" was made into a short film directed by Bruce Schwartz. It starred Sean Hayes as Sammy and Amy Smart as Queenie in their first official movie roles, later shown on Spike TV.

== Sources ==
- Begley, Adam. 2014. Updike. HarperCollins Publishers, New York. ISBN 978-0-06189645-3
- Carduff, Christopher. 2013. Ref. 1 Note on the Texts in John Updike: Collected Early Stories. Christopher Carduff, editor. The Library of America. pp. 910–924 ISBN 978-1-59853-251-7
- Detweiler, Robert. 1984. John Updike. Twayne Publishers, G. K. Hall & Co., Boston, Massachusetts. ISBN 0-8057-7429-7 (Paperback).
- Luscher, Robert M. 1993. John Updike: A Study of the Short Fiction. Twayne Publishers, New York. ISBN 978-0805708509
- Macnaughton, William R.. 1982. Critical Essays on John Updike. William R. Macnaughton, editor. G. K. Hall & Co., Boston, Massachusetts. ISBN 0-8161-8467-4
- Mizener, Arthur 1962. "Behind the Dazzle is a Knowing Eye" The New York Times Book Review, March 18, 1962. https://archive.nytimes.com/www.nytimes.com/books/97/04/06/lifetimes/updike-r-pigeon2.html Retrieved 2 March 2023.
- Mizener, Arthur. 1964. Memory in Pigeon Feathers excerpted from "The American Hero as High-School Boy: Peter Caldwell in John Updike: A Collection of Critical Essays. 1979. David Thorburn and Howard Eiland editors. pp. 178–182. ISBN 0-13-937607-0
- Olster, Stacey. 2006. Introduction :The Cambridge Companion to John Updike. Stacey Olster, editor. Cambridge University Press, Cambridge. ISBN 0-521-60730-2 (paperback)
- Pritchard, Richard H. 2000. Updike: America's Man of Letters. Steerforth Press, Southroyalton, Vermont.ISBN 1-58642-002-X
- Rupp, Richard H.. 1970. John Updike: Style in Search of a Center, from Celebration in Post-War American Fiction: 1945-1967, University of Miami Press, in John Updike: Modern Critical Views, Harold Bloom, editor. ISBN 0-87754-717-3
