= Snowing in Greenwich Village =

- Short story by John Updike
- Country: United States
- Language: English

Publication
- Published in: The New Yorker
- Publication date: January 13, 1956

"Snowing in Greenwich Village" is a short story by John Updike, first published in The New Yorker on January 13, 1956. The story was collected in The Same Door (1959), published by Alfred A. Knopf.

== Plot ==
The story is told in the third-person limited omniscient, with Richard Maple as the focal character.

A recently married young couple, Richard and Joan Maple, have moved into a roomier West Thirteenth Street apartment in Manhattan, New York. He works for an advertising agency.

They invite a local acquaintance, Rebecca Cune, for a casual house-warming and a few drinks. She is single and known for her droll and rather cryptic renderings of local characters among their social set. Richard takes special pleasure in playing the attentive host.

Joan, suffering from a protracted cold, senses a subtle sexual charge between her husband and their guest. She is subconsciously alarmed. When Joan is alerted to a passing patrol of mounted police near their apartment, she rushes to the window. Joan is exultant that snow is beginning to fall, and in a display of possessiveness, throws her arms around Richard. Rebecca observes this outburst with apparent detachment. When she prepares to walk back to her nearby apartment, Joan insists that Richard accompany her due to the snow.

Arriving at the housing complex, Richard becomes aroused by Rebecca's body as he mounts the stairs with her. Entering the apartment, Richard notes that her double bed dominates the small dwelling. The two stand near one another without moving for several moments. The spell is broken when Richard retreats to the door, and after an inept effort to make a joke, departs.

The story ends with the omniscient observation that Richard and Rebecca, now neighbors, are acutely aware of their physical proximity: "Oh but they were close."

== Background ==
"Richard Maple occupies a clearly defined space in the constellation of Updike alter egos. He is the character into whom Updike poured, over a span of thirty-eight years, his feelings about being a husband and father."—Biographer Adam Begley in Updike (2014)

"Snowing in Greenwich Village" is among the eight short stories Updike wrote between 1955 and 1957. Set in Manhattan, and introducing the fictional couple Richard and Joan Maple, the drama closely resembles the lives of Updike and his spouse Mary Pennington Updike.

These eight New York stories, of which "Snowing in Greenwich Village" is perhaps the best known, appear in The Same Door (1959). Updike would not begin to develop the Maple saga for six years, until reintroducing the couple in the short story "Giving Blood" (1962). "Snowing in Greenwich Village" would emerge as, in Updike' subsequent treatment of the couple "the beginning of the end" of the Maple marriage.

The character Rebecca Cune, who appears as Richard Maple's sexual nemesis, was modeled on a friend of the Updikes. The young woman's bemused reaction to her portrayal, and the hostile reaction from her boyfriend, initially abashed Updike. Upon reconsideration, Updike adopted the doctrine that his literary work was, by necessity, "the truth, slightly arranged."

== Theme ==
Updike's Rebecca Cune is a veteran of the Manhattan social scene, who collects anecdotes about the denizens of the city and from these devises a cynical retelling to amuse her cosmopolitan circle of friends. Richard Detweiler writes:

That Rebecca is a predator in every way Richard suddenly grasps after his wife's impulsive embrace, as he sees Joan and himself from Rebecca's viewpoint. She will twist the moment of tenderness into a joke when she narrates the scene to other friends...

The crisis approaches when Joan, in a "risky strategy", encourages her husband to accompany the attractive Rebecca to her nearby apartment during an impending snowstorm. Upon arrival in her realm, Richard is acutely aware that an "extramarital adventure" both threatens and beckons. At the "crucial moment", Richard makes a clumsy and stammering retreat from the apartment. Deweiler observes: "Richard has had a quick glance into the tantalizing maze of illicit romance, but also the luck, or the grace, to avoid its penalties- emotional, social and moral...Lust can teach." Updike leaves the reader with a caveat on the implications of Rebecca's and Richard's final parting:

"If she is sexual enough, the single girl, such as Rebecca Cune (Cune equals cunt...), is a natural threat to other marriages...Like a single woman (always a version of a prostitute), she must become a wife or be disposed of."—Literary critic Mary Allen in John Updike's Love of "Dull Bovine Beauty" (1976)

As he went downstairs she rested both hands on the banister and looked down toward the next landing. "Good night," she said. "Night." He looked up; she had gone into her room. Oh but they were close.

Regarding the moral ambiguity of the story, critic Pritchard notes:

The story is artful and satisfying for the way it tempts the reader into interpretive moves while refusing to endorse any of them...We're closer to the atmosphere of Chekov than to O. Henry, or for that matter of either Salinger or Cheever.

== Sources ==
- Allen, Mary. 1976. John Updike's Love of "Dull Bovine Beauty" from The Necessary Blankness: Women in Major American Fiction of the Sixties. from University of Illinois Press, 1976 in John Updike: Modern Critical Views, Harold Bloom, editor. pp. 69–95 ISBN 0-87754-717-3
- Begley, Adam. 2014. Updike. HarperCollins Publishers, New York. ISBN 978-0-06189645-3
- Detweiler, Robert. 1984. John Updike. Twayne Publishers, G. K. Hall & Co., Boston, Massachusetts. ISBN 0-8057-7429-7 (Paperback).
