= Yale University Press =

Publishing arm of Yale University

- Parent company: Yale University
- Status: Active
- Founded: 1908; 118 years ago
- Founder: George Parmly Day; Clarence Day
- Country of origin: United States
- Headquarters location: New Haven, Connecticut, U.S.
- Distribution: TriLiteral (United States); Wiley (international)
- Nonfiction topics: Various
- Fiction genres: Poetry, Literature in translation
- Imprints: Yale Nota Bene
- Official website: yalebooks.yale.edu

The Yale University Press's logo from 1985 to 2010, designed by Paul Rand

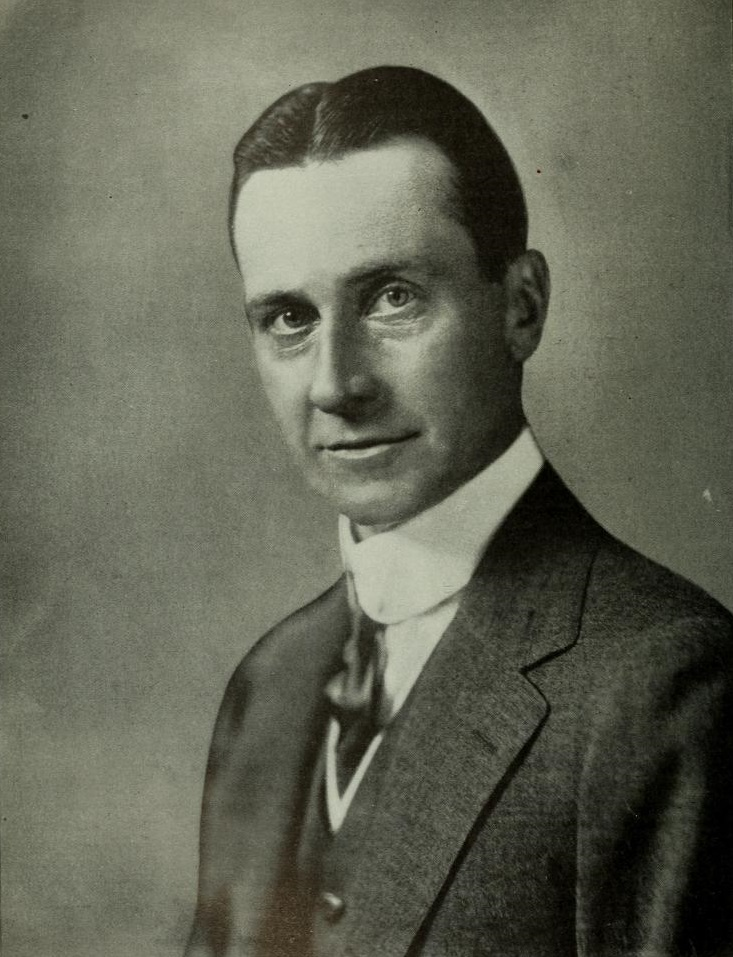
George Parmly Day, founder of the Yale University Press

Yale University Press is the university press of Yale University. It was founded in 1908 by George Parmly Day and Clarence Day, grandsons of Benjamin Day, and became a department of Yale University in 1961, but it remains financially and operationally autonomous.

As of 2002, Yale University Press published approximately 300 new hardcover and 150 new paperback books annually and had a backlist of about 5,000 books in print. Its books have won five National Book Awards, two National Book Critics Circle Awards and eight Pulitzer Prizes. Its literary programs include the Yale Series of Younger Poets, established in 1919.

The press maintains offices in New Haven, Connecticut and London, England. Yale is the only American university press with a full-scale publishing operation in Europe. It was a co-founder of the distributor TriLiteral LLC with MIT Press and Harvard University Press. TriLiteral was sold to LSC Communications in 2018.

== History ==
Yale University Press was founded in 1908 by George Parmly Day and his brother Clarence Day. It issued its first book, The Beginnings of Gospel Story by Benjamin Wisner Bacon, in 1909, and moved from a small office in New York City to New Haven in 1910. From 1918 to 1948, its books were designed under the printer Carl Purington Rollins. Among the press's early series were The Chronicles of America, The Yale Shakespeare (1918–1929) and the Yale Series of Younger Poets, launched in 1919.

== Series and publishing programs ==
=== Yale Series of Younger Poets ===
Since its inception in 1919, the Yale Series of Younger Poets Competition has published the first collection of poetry by new poets. The first winner was Howard Buck.

=== Yale Drama Series ===
Yale University Press and Yale Repertory Theatre jointly sponsor the Yale Drama Series, a playwriting competition. The winner of the annual competition is awarded the David C. Horn Prize of $10,000, publication of his/her manuscript by Yale University Press, and a staged reading at Yale Rep. The Yale Drama Series and David C. Horn Prize are funded by the David Charles Horn Foundation.

=== Anchor Yale Bible Series ===
In 2007, Yale University Press acquired the Anchor Bible Series, a collection of more than 115 volumes of biblical scholarship, from the Doubleday Publishing Group. New and backlist titles are now published under the Anchor Yale Bible Series name.

=== Future of American Democracy Series ===
Yale University Press is publishing the Future of American Democracy Series, which "aims to examine, sustain, and renew the historic vision of American democracy in a series of books by some of America's foremost thinkers", in partnership with the Future of American Democracy Foundation.

=== The Lamar Series in Western History ===
The Lamar Series in Western History (formerly the Yale Western Americana series) was established in 1962 to publish works that enhance the understanding of human affairs in the American West and contribute to a wider understanding of why the West matters in the political, social, and cultural life of America.

=== Terry Lectures Series ===
The Dwight H. Terry Lectureship was established in 1905 to encourage the consideration of religion in the context of modern science, psychology, and philosophy. Many of the lectures, which are hosted by Yale University, have been edited into book form by the Yale University Press.

=== Yale Nota Bene ===
On September 22, 2000, Yale University Press announced a new Yale Nota Bene imprint that would "feature reprints of best-selling and classic Yale Press titles encompassing works of history, religion, science, current affairs, reference and biography, in addition to fiction, poetry and drama."

=== Other series ===
Other Yale University Press series include:

- The Annotated Shakespeare, begun in 2003, presenting individual plays with on-page annotations by Burton Raffel.
- Ancient Lives, short biographies of figures from the ancient world.
- Black Lives, short biographies of individuals of African descent.
- Jewish Lives, launched in 2010 with the Leon D. Black Foundation, publishing biographies of Jewish figures.
- The Margellos World Republic of Letters, devoted to literature in translation.
- The Papers of Benjamin Franklin, a scholarly edition of Franklin's writings sponsored jointly with the American Philosophical Society.
- The Works of Jonathan Edwards, a scholarly edition completed in 26 volumes.

The press also awards the biennial Yale Nonfiction Book Prize, sponsored with The Yale Review, for a book-length work of nonfiction by a writer who has not previously published one.

== Controversies ==
=== Mises' Human Action ===
In 1963, the Press published a revised edition of Ludwig von Mises's Human Action. In the May 5, 1964 issue of National Review, Henry Hazlitt wrote the story "Mangling a Masterpiece", accusing Yale University Press of intentionally typesetting the new edition in an amateurish fashion, due to the Press's differing ideological beliefs.

=== Muhammad cartoons ===
In August 2009, officials at the Press ignited a controversy when they decided to expunge reproductions of the cartoons involved in the Jyllands-Posten Muhammad cartoons controversy, along with all other images of Muhammad, from a scholarly book entitled The Cartoons that Shook the World, by professor Jytte Klausen.

=== Internet Archive lawsuit ===
Yale University Press joined The Association of American Publishers trade organization in the Hachette v. Internet Archive lawsuit which resulted in the removal of access to over 500,000 books from global readers.

== See also ==
- List of English-language book publishing companies
- List of university presses
