= Jewish Lives =

Biography series

Jewish Lives is a biography series published by Yale University Press and the Leon D. Black Foundation. It was founded in 2006 and the first book was published in 2010.

The series explores the lives of influential Jews from antiquity through the present, including Moses, Albert Einstein, Louis D. Brandeis, Barbra Streisand, David Ben-Gurion, Emma Goldman, and more.

Jewish Lives titles have been favorably reviewed by the New York Times and the Wall Street Journal.

In 2014, Jewish Lives won the National Jewish Book of the Year Award, marking the first time the Jewish Book Council awarded a series the prize.

In 2017, the Leon D. Black Foundation launched JewishLives.org, an ecommerce store where Jewish Lives books and collections are sold. The Jewish Lives Podcast was launched in 2019.

In 2026, Jewish Lives launched Ask Jewish Lives, a free artificial intelligence platform that allows users to engage in text-based conversations with historical Jewish figures based on their portrayals in the Jewish Lives biography series.

== Works in the series ==
As of 2026, Jewish Lives includes the following titles:

Antiquity

- Abraham: The First Jew by Anthony Julius (2025)
- Rabbi Akiva: Sage of the Talmud by Barry W. Holtz (2017)
- David: The Divided Heart by David Wolpe (2014)
- Becoming Elijah: Prophet of Transformation by Daniel C. Matt (2022)
- Herod the Great: Jewish King in a Roman World by Martin Goodman (2024)
- Jacob: Unexpected Patriarch by Yair Zakovitch (2012)
- Moses: A Human Life by Avivah Gottlieb Zornberg (2016)
- Ruth: A Migrant's Tale by Ilana Pardes (2022)
- Solomon: The Lure of Wisdom by Steven Weitzman (2011)

Arts / Culture

- Bernard Berenson: A Life in the Picture Trade by Rachel Cohen (2013)
- Irving Berlin: New York Genius by James Kaplan (2019)
- Leonard Bernstein: An American Musician by Allen Shawn (2014)
- Peggy Guggenheim: The Shock of the Modern by Francine Prose (2015)
- Carole King: She Made the Earth Move by Jane Eisner (2025)
- Man Ray: The Artist and His Shadows by Arthur Lubow (2021)
- Jerome Robbins: A Life in Dance by Wendy Lesser (2018)
- Mark Rothko: Toward the Light in the Chapel by Annie Cohen-Solal (2014)
- Alfred Stieglitz: Taking Pictures, Making Painters by Phyllis Rose (2019)

Business

- Julius Rosenwald: Repairing the World by Hasia R. Diner (2017)

Entertainment

- Sarah: The Life of Sarah Bernhardt by Robert Gottlieb (2010)
- Mel Brooks: Disobedient Jew by Jeremy Dauber (2023)
- Hank Greenberg: The Hero Who Didn’t Want to Be One by Mark Kurlansky (2011)
- Ben Hecht: Fighting Words, Moving Pictures by Adina Hoffman (2019)
- Houdini: The Elusive American by Adam Begley (2020)
- Stanley Kubrick: American Filmmaker by David Mikics (2020)
- Stan Lee: A Life in Comics by Liel Leibovitz (2020)
- Groucho Marx: The Comedy of Existence by Lee Siegel (2015)
- Louis B. Mayer and Irving Thalberg: The Whole Equation by Kenneth Turan (2025)
- Stephen Sondheim: Art Isn’t Easy by Daniel Okrent (2026)
- Steven Spielberg: A Life in Films by Molly Haskell (2016)
- Barbra Streisand: Redefining Beauty, Femininity, and Power by Neal Gabler (2016)
- Warner Bros: The Making of an American Movie Studio by David Thomson (2017)

Law / Politics

- Ben-Gurion: Father of Modern Israel by Anita Shapira (2014)
- Judah Benjamin: Counselor to the Confederacy by James Traub (2021)
- Léon Blum: Prime Minister, Socialist, Zionist by Pierre Birnbaum (2015)
- Louis D. Brandeis: American Prophet by Jeffrey Rosen (2016)
- Moshe Dayan: Israel’s Controversial Hero by Mordechai Bar-On (2012)
- Disraeli: The Novel Politician, by David Cesarani (2016)
- Alfred Dreyfus: The Man at the Center of the Affair by Maurice Samuels (2024)
- Emma Goldman: Revolution as a Way of Life by Vivian Gornick (2011)
- Theodor Herzl: The Charismatic Leader by Derek Penslar (2020)
- Jabotinsky: A Life by Hillel Halkin (2014)
- Golda Meir: Israel's Matriarch by Deborah Lipstadt (2023)
- Harvey Milk: His Lives and Death by Lillian Faderman (2018)
- Yitzhak Rabin: Soldier, Leader, Statesman by Itamar Rabinovich (2017)
- Walther Rathenau: Weimar’s Fallen Statesman by Shulamit Volkov (2011)
- Edmond de Rothschild: Finding Zion by James McAuley (2026)
- Henrietta Szold: Hadassah and the Zionist Dream by Francine Klagsbrun (2024)
- Leon Trotsky: A Revolutionary’s Life by Joshua Rubenstein (2011)

Literary Arts

- Hayim Nahman Bialik: Poet of Hebrew by Avner Holtzman (2017)
- The Many Lives of Anne Frank by Ruth Franklin (2025)
- Betty Friedan: Magnificent Disrupter by Rachel Shteir (2023)
- Heinrich Heine: Writing the Revolution by George Prochnick (2020)
- Lillian Hellman: An Imperious Life by Dorothy Gallagher (2013)
- Franz Kafka: The Poet of Shame and Guilt by Saul Friedländer (2013)
- Primo Levi: The Matter of a Life by Berel Lang (2013)
- Arthur Miller: American Witness by John Lahr (2022)
- Amos Oz: Writer, Activist Icon by Robert Alter (2023)
- Proust: The Search by Benjamin Taylor (2015)
- Ayn Rand: Writing a Gospel of Success by Alexandra Popoff (2024)
- Philip Roth: Stung by Life by Steven J. Zipperstein (2025)
- Elie Wiesel: Confronting the Silence by Joseph Berger (2023)

Philosophy / Religion

- Walter Benjamin: The Pearl Diver by Peter E. Gordon (2026)
- Maimonides: Faith in Reason by Alberto Manguel (2023)
- Menasseh ben Israel: Rabbi of Amsterdam by Steven Nadler (2018)
- Martin Buber: A Life of Faith and Dissent by Paul Mendes-Flohr (2019)
- Abraham Joshua Heschel: A Life of Radical Amazement by Julian E. Zelizer (2021)
- Mordecai M. Kaplan: Restless Soul by Jenna Weissman Joselit (2026)
- Rav Kook: Mystic in a Time of Revolution by Yehudah Mirsky (2013)
- Karl Marx: Philosophy and Revolution by Shlomo Avineri (2019)
- Moses Mendelssohn: Sage of Modernity by Shmuel Feiner (2010)
- Menachem Mendel Schneerson: Becoming the Messiah by Ezra Glinter (2024)
- Gershom Scholem: Master of the Kabbalah by David Biale (2018)
- Spinoza: Freedom's Messiah by Ian Buruma (2024)
- Ludwig Wittgenstein: Philosophy in the Age of Airplanes by Anthony Gottlieb (2025)

Rogues

- Sidney Reilly: Master Spy by Benny Morris (2022)
- Bugsy Siegel: The Dark Side of the American Dream by Michael Shnayerson (2021)

Science

- Franz Boas: In Praise of Open Minds by Noga Arikha (2025)
- Einstein: His Space and Times by Steven Gimbel (2015)
- Becoming Freud: The Making of a Psychoanalyst by Adam Phillips (2014)
- Robert Oppenheimer: The Sphinx Without a Secret by David Rieff (2026)
- Admiral Hyman Rickover: Engineer of Power by Marc Wortman (2022)
