= Pigeon Feathers (short story) =

- Short story by John Updike
- Country: United States
- Language: English

Publication
- Published in: The New Yorker
- Publication date: August 11, 1961

"Pigeon Feathers" is a short story by John Updike which first appeared in The New Yorker on August 11, 1961. The story was collected in Pigeon Feathers and Other Stories (1962) by Alfred A. Knopf.

"Pigeon Feathers" was listed among the recipients of the O. Henry Award in 1962.

== Plot ==
David Kern, a boy in his mid-teens, moves with his mother to a rural farm, a displacement from his former home that he finds traumatic. At his new house, David discovers a copy of H. G. Wells' The Outline of History. In this work, Wells portrays Jesus of Nazareth as a purely historical figure and not of divine origins. David is cast into a crisis of faith which causes him to question the existence of a supreme being. While in the family's outhouse, he experiences a horrifying premonition of his unredeemed soul. Neither David's parents nor the Lutheran minister can provide satisfactory answers to his questions regarding his emerging dilemma.

In an effort to distract her son from his suffering, his mother mentions that his grandmother would like the numerous pigeons culled from the rafters of her barn. David takes his Remington .22 rifle, a recent gift from his parents and, after some hesitation, begins to systematically shoot the birds. Though David warms to his task, he becomes dismayed at the slaughter and stops. While his mother helps him to bury the birds, David examines the feathers of the dead animals, admiring their color and texture. David realizes that where there is exquisite design in nature there can be purpose in life and ultimate salvation.

== Theme ==
Ostensibly a coming-of-age story, "Pigeon Feathers" concerns a youth's "crisis of faith" that threatens to destroy the religious foundations of his Lutheran upbringing.

"Pigeon Feathers"...represents an archetypal maturation ritual, a personal coming-of-age of a young man who is not satisfied by the formal ecclesiastical rites (catechism and confirmation) but who uses worldly implements (above the gun) to fight through the trauma toward adulthood. —Robert Detweiler in John Updike (1984).

Literary critic Richard Detweiler writes: "Its hero, the fourteen-year-old David Kern, suffers from a terrifying religious crisis; the force of the tale is in rendering credible the experience of faith and doubt that takes place in an adolescent mind."

The Kern family move from the ancestral farm, from fictional Olinger to the rural Firetown, has "autobiographical contours." The event is a literary dramatization of Updike's family displacement, under the direction of his mother, Linda Updike, from the town of Shillington, Pennsylvania, to the rural village of Plowville, Pennsylvania when he was a boy.

Literary critic Richard Detwieler explains that the "alienation" that David Kern experiences a result of this move "finds expression in a religious dilemma." Detwieler emphasizes that "the element of displacement is crucial to the story." Detwieler writes:

The move from town to country makes David Kern a self-styled refugee...it underscores his experience as a spiritual outsider. But that isolation changes when he realizes that all men are spiritual outsiders - that religion is an elaborate ruse designed not to help one face death honestly but to cushion its reality. Detweiler adds: "If the path from six dead pigeons towards a God who cares seems absurd, it is no more so than the tortuous directions mapped by wise men of the last few centuries."

In handling the dead pigeons after killing them, David Kern has an epiphany at the burial site with his mother. Literary critic William H. Pritchard provides the "often quoted" closing passage of the story:

"It is only when Allen Kern studies in detail the intricate patterns and color schemes of the wings of the pigeons he shot that he realizes in an Emersonian moment that everything is interconnected, that the tiniest little artifact finds correspondence in the larger world, that ultimately such concentricity...is itself another name for the divine." —Literary critic Kristiaan Versluys in The Cambridge Companion to John Updike.

As he fitted the last two, still pliant, on the top, and stood up, crusty coverings were lifted from him, and with a feminine, slipping sensation along his nerves that seemed to give the air hands, he was robed in this certainty: that the God who had lavished such craft upon these worthless birds would not destroy his whole Creation by refusing to let David live forever.

Pritchard adds: "Updike's fiction finds that David has undergone an initiation here, is now complicit with sin and death, having killed the pigeons, but also enabled by the experience..."

Generalizing on the story's denouement, literary critic Kathleen Verduin writes: "In Updike, what is ordinary may quickly turn into an epiphany and no phenomenon is therefore too small to merit attention."

== Film adaptation ==
"Pigeon Feathers" was adapted into a film and presented in 1988 on the Public Broadcasting American Playhouse series. It was directed by Sharron Miller and starred Christopher Collet, Caroline McWilliams, Jeffrey DeMunn, Lenka Peterson, and Boyd Gaines. It tells the story of David, a young man who has a crisis of faith as he struggles with his belief in life after death.

== Sources ==
- Allen, Mary. 1976. John Updike's Love of "Dull Bovine Beauty" from The Necessary Blankness: Women in Major American Fiction of the Sixties. from University of Illinois Press, 1976 in John Updike: Modern Critical Views, Harold Bloom, editor. pp. 69–95 ISBN 0-87754-717-3
- Begley, Adam. 2014. Updike. HarperCollins Publishers, New York. ISBN 978-0-06189645-3
- Detweiler, Robert. 1984. John Updike. Twayne Publishers, G. K. Hall & Co., Boston, Massachusetts. ISBN 0-8057-7429-7 (Paperback).
- Macnaughton, William R. 1982. Critical Essays on John Updike. G. K. Hall & Co., Boston, Massachusetts. ISBN 0-8161-8467-4
- Olster, Stacey. 2006. The Cambridge Companion to John Updike. Cambridge University Press, Cambridge. ISBN 0-521-60730-2 (paperback)
- Pritchard, Richard H. 2000. Updike: America's Man of Letters. Steerforth Press, Southroyalton, Vermont.ISBN 1-58642-002-X
- Verduin, Kathleen]. 1982. "Fatherly Presences: John Updike's Place in a Protestant Tradition." in Critical Essays on John Updike. G. K. Hall & Co. (1982), William R. Macnaughton, editor. pp. 254–268. ISBN 0-8186-8467-4
- Versluys, Kristiaan. 2006. "Nakedness" or Realism in Updike's Early Short Stories in The Cambridge Companion to John Updike (2006). Stacey Olster, editor. pp. 29–41 Cambridge University Press, Cambridge. ISBN 0-521-60730-2 (paperback).
