= Ace in the Hole (short story) =

1955 short story by John Updike

- Short story by John Updike
- Country: United States
- Language: English

Publication
- Published in: The New Yorker
- Publication date: April 9, 1955

"Ace in the Hole" is a short story by John Updike that first appeared in The New Yorker on April 9, 1955. The story was collected in a volume of Updike's fiction, The Same Door (1959), published by Alfred A. Knopf.

== Plot ==
The story describes a single hour in the life of 26-year-old Fred "Ace" Anderson, an ex-high school basketball star who is now married and rearing an infant daughter with his young spouse, Evey. The couple are representative of a stratum of working-class youth in the America of the 1950s reflected in their enthusiasm for popular music, TV entertainment and laced with beer and cigarettes. Ace tends to dwell on his glory days as a record-setting athlete. He exhibits little ambition.

Ace arrives home early: he has been fired that afternoon from his job as a used-car salesman—not his first such setback. He dreads delivering the news to Evey. He turns on the car radio to distract himself with some popular music.

Ace drops by his mother's home to pick up the couple's infant girl, Bonnie. When Ace informs his mother that he has lost his job, she exempts him from any responsibility for the dismissal and ridicules his former employer. She makes a number of disparaging remarks about her daughter-in-law, to which Ace endures, but to which he does not capitulate. The fact that the couple have contrary religious faiths—he is a Protestant, she a Catholic—a perennial complaint from the mother-in-law.

Evey arrives home exhausted from her entry-level office job. She launches into a sustained litany of complaints about Ace's irresponsibility. The depth of her cynicism towards her husband is a measure of how far the marriage has deteriorated. Ace is unable to offer any concrete measures that will mitigate his wife's loss of faith in him. In an effort to deflect the situation, he tunes the radio to some lively dance music, and begins to swing with Evey, who submits to his affectionate blandishments. The ending is ambiguous: The dance may mark a decline or a new beginning for their relationship.

== Background ==
Updike wrote the first draft of this story while attending an advanced course in creative writing at Harvard University, taught by Albert J. Guerard. Originally entitled "Flick", the story was rejected when offered to The New Yorker in early 1954. While doing post-graduate studies at Oxford University that summer, Updike revised the story and retitled it "Ace in the Hole." The work was accepted by The New Yorker in January 1955 and published in April that year.

== Critical Assessment ==
Literary critic Robert Detweiler writes: "Updike has forced more news about one dead end along the American way of life into one brief story than many writers manage to report in a whole novel."

Updike has found his metier in "Ace in the Hole." The story offers less in terms of plot and action ... but much more in terms of pure mood created out of pure verbal craftsmanship ... it is a sustained metaphor of nervous movement and a tension of opposites.

— Robert Detweiler in John Updike (1984)

Literary critic John Gerlach reminds the reader of the "complexity" with which Updike endows his young protagonist. Ace, though retreating to "images of the past" does not appear to be permanently arrested in his emotional development. Gerlach writes:

Despite [Ace's] obvious immaturity he shows signs of wisdom: he ignores his mother's encouragement to break up his marriage, and although he acted foolishly in the incident that got him fired, he is neither proud nor defensive.

Gerlach notes that Updike's handling of Ace's "slow development ... permits the reader to invest interest in the character study, and it is this particularity, this interest in social realism that in part differentiates Updike's approach from Hemingway's."

== Theme ==
The sexual double entendre in the title is self-evident: Ace retains his youthful good looks and virile energy, suggesting easy conquests in his interpersonal relationships, sexual or otherwise. That Ace "in the hole" has a more sinister implication. Detweiler writes: "The protagonist is ... jobless, unprepared to be a man, and threatened with a spouse nearly ready to leave him. But he has his ace in the hole: his animal charm and his instincts that will help him to survive even if he ruins others in the process."

Demoralized by her husband's lack of contrition after his dismissal from his job, and his delusional obsession with past glories, Evey confronts Ace with "the mediocrity of his present condition, understandingly equating it with her own." Literary critic Mary Allen writes: "Ace's wife ridicules the very possibility of a meaningful occupation; it does not exist for her ... and his ambition appears ridiculous."

Literary editor Stacey Olster notes that the character of Fred "Ace" Anderson is resurrected in Updike's Rabbit, Run (1960) in the more fully realized character Harry "Rabbit" Angstrom:

Both know deep in their bones that good looks and a smooth style will trump conventional behavior every time, and that other people will clean up your messes, and possibly even envy you for being daring enough to make them.

Updike offers an "inversion" of the coming-of-age story, in which Ace appears to be squadering the opportunity that his domestic crisis with Evey presents, and deflecting the challenge with a display of "wasteful nervous energy." Literary critic Robert Detweiler discovers a social tragedy implicit in Ace's personal difficulties:

"Ace in the Hole" seems authentic because it fashions a modern American type, the teenage hero seduced by quick success into thinking that the adult world is easy to conquer but who soon suffers dissolution and the gradual degeneration into bumhood.

== Sources ==
- Allen, Mary. 1976. "John Updike's Love of 'Dull Bovine Beauty'" from The Necessary Blankness: Women in Major American Fiction of the Sixties. from University of Illinois Press, 1976 in John Updike: Modern Critical Views, Harold Bloom, editor. pp. 69–95 ISBN 0-87754-717-3
- Carduff, Christopher. 2013. Ref. 1 Note on the Texts in John Updike: Collected Early Stories. Christopher Carduff, editor. The Library of America. pp. 910–924 ISBN 978-1-59853-251-7
- Detweiler, Robert. 1984. John Updike. Twayne Publishers, G. K. Hall & Co., Boston, Massachusetts. ISBN 0-8057-7429-7 (Paperback).
- Gerlach, John. 1985. Toward the End: Closure and Structure in the American Short Story. University of Alabama Press in John Updike: A Study of the Short Fiction. Twayne Publishers, New York. pp. 191–194. ISBN 0-8057-0850-2
- Luscher, Robert M. 1993. John Updike: A Study of the Short Fiction. Twayne Publishers, New York. ISBN 0-8057-0850-2
