= David Thorburn (scholar) =

American scholar and poet

- Born: David Thorburn
- Education: Princeton (BA), Stanford (MA, PhD)
- Occupations: Scholar, Poet
- Writing career
- Language: English
- Genres: Literary criticism, Media studies, Modernist literature
- Notable works: Conrad's Romanticism, Knots
- Notable awards: MacVicar Fellowship (top MIT teaching award); Fellowships: Fulbright; Woodrow Wilson; Rockefeller Foundation

David Thorburn is an American professor emeritus of literature at the Massachusetts Institute of Technology who is notable for media studies, literary criticism, and teaching. His poetry has appeared in Slate Magazine, Threepenny Review, The Atlantic, and elsewhere. His book of poems Knots was published in 2020. He was one of the first academics to study the medium of television as an academic field of inquiry. He was the director of MIT's Communications Forum for twenty years. He is regarded as an authority on modernist literature, and he was selected by the Teaching Company to teach the course Masterworks of Early 20th-Century Literature.

== Early years ==
Thorburn received a bachelor's degree from Princeton and an MA and PhD from Stanford and taught at Yale. A student, Thomas E. Ricks, described Professor Thorburn as a challenging and thought-provoking teacher, remembering that one of his challenges——to tell why Mickey Spillane's I, the Jury was not a great novel——was one of the "best assessments" he ever got during his studies there. After ten years at Yale, he joined the literature faculty at MIT. His research interests include modernist writers such as Joseph Conrad, D. H. Lawrence, and James Joyce as well as later writers such as John Updike. His fiction anthology entitled Initiation: Stories and Short Novels on Three Themes became a popular source for high school and college students.

== Media studies ==
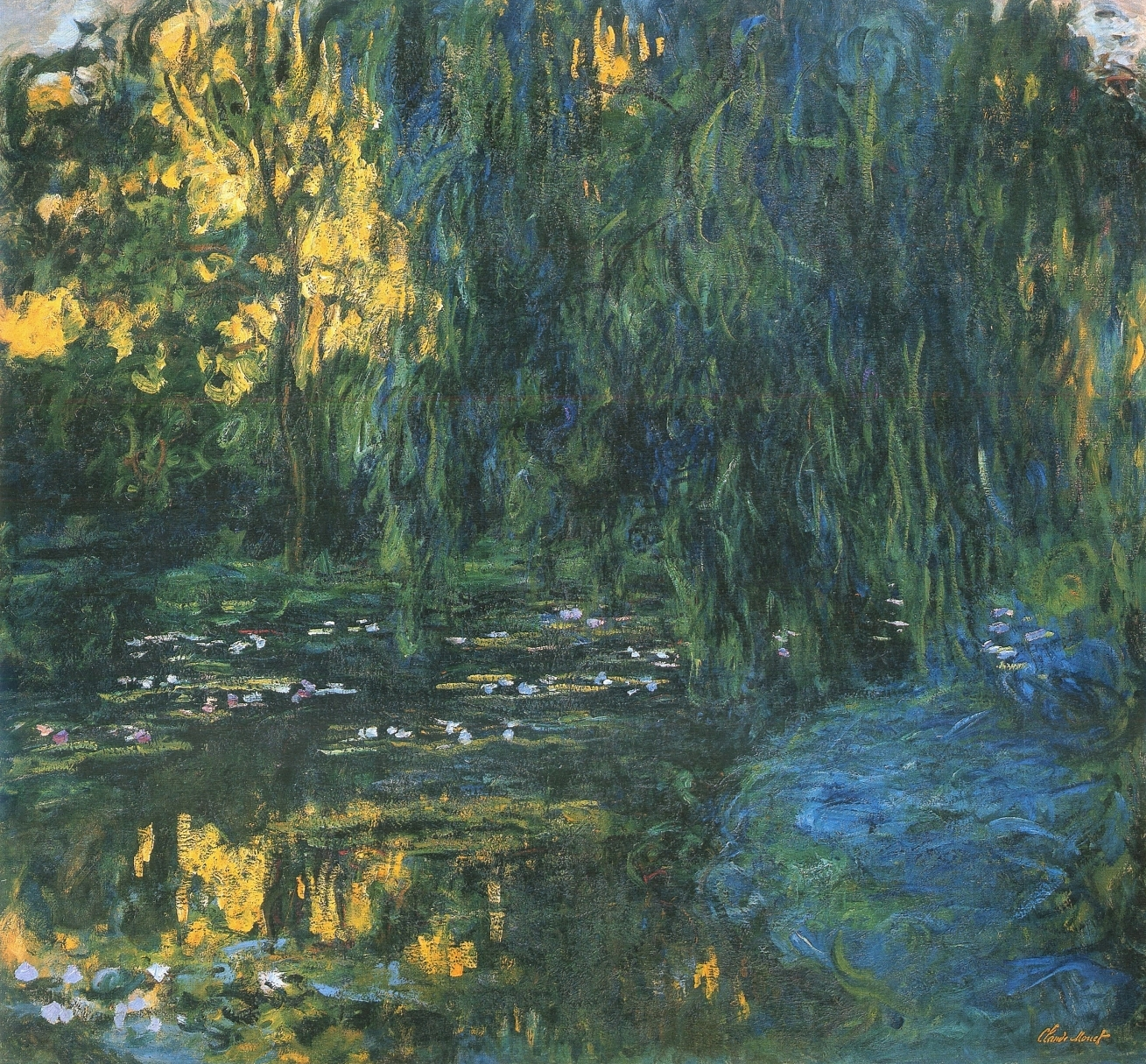
Thorburn, in his Teaching Company course entitled Masterworks of Early 20th-Century Literature, made connections between impressionist painters and modernist literature. He suggested that modernist writers, like Claude Monet's impressionist paintings of water lilies, showed an awareness of art as art, rejected realistic interpretations of the world, registered the limitations of art, and dramatized "a drive towards the abstract".

Thorburn joined MIT in 1976. He was the founder and first director of the MIT Film and Media Studies program which is now known as the Comparative Media Studies program. In 1996, he became director of MIT's Communications Forum, which sponsors panel discussions with particular focus on how communications are affected by politics and culture, with special attention to emerging technologies such as the Internet. As director of MIT's Communications Forum, Thorburn helped bring conferences on controversial topics to MIT, such as the views of V. A. Shiva Ayyadurai regarding the future of the U. S. Post Office, as well as the fate of the newspaper industry in the digital age, and copyright issues featuring Richard Stallman. He brought television writer David Milch, who served as a writer and producer on Hill Street Blues, to a class he taught on the media. He suggested in a 1977 critique in the Georgia Review that television drama should be studied with the "same care and attentiveness we bring to the study of literature, music and film." Regarding the future of newspapers, he forecast that national brands would survive but regional and local papers might have to struggle, although he remains optimistic about the possibilities of technology:

The new technologies can empower ordinary people in ways that have not been anticipated. One of the great things that we are learning about the new technologies is how they exponentially enlarge the principle of unexpected outcomes of unintended results.

— David Thorburn, in Scientific American, 2006

Thorburn is regarded as an authority on how media influences politics. His course American Television: A Cultural History, examined the medium in a context of humanism. He was one of the first scholars to analyze television from a scholarly perspective. In 2008, he described the World Wide Web as not as powerful then as traditional media such as television, although it was increasingly a major source of fund-raising for candidates. In an essay in The American Prospect, he wondered whether the human disposition to view new technologies through the use of metaphor might be limiting our understanding of the intrinsic qualities and possibilities of the Internet.

The computer encourages joining, interaction, sharing, the creation of communities of interest; yet it is also congenial to our uncivic preferences for isolation, the avoidance of human contact, solipsism, "lurking," voyeurism. Through its power to confer anonymity, it feeds instincts for scandal, revenge, name-calling, surveillance, pornography.

— David Thorburn, 2001

== Awards and honors ==
Thorburn was awarded Fulbright, Woodrow Wilson, and Rockefeller Foundation fellowships. He won MIT's highest teaching award, the MacVicar Faculty Fellowship, in 2002.

== Scholarship and teaching ==
Thorburn is a critic of over-analysis of literature with excessive focus on trivia.

It is dispiriting to realize how swiftly Cliffs Notes principles have been diffused across the Web. It is even more disturbing to reflect on how minutely the canon of Western literature has been routinized and commodified, murdered and dissected by assembly-line practices, and then to think on how enfeebled must be the reading and writing skills of the poor souls who buy such papers.

— David Thorburn, 2004

== Books ==
• Initiation: Stories and Short Novels on Three Themes, edited with an introduction (Harcourt Brace, 1971; second edition, 1976).

• Romanticism: Vistas, Instances, Continuities, co-edited with Geoffrey Hartman (Cornell University Press, 1973).

• Conrad's Romanticism (Yale University Press, 1974; second printing, 1975).^{[6]}

• John Updike: A Collection of Critical Essays, co-edited with Howard Eiland (Prentice Hall, 1979).^{[17]}

• Media and Popular Culture, General Editor, book series (HarperCollins, seven volumes, 1988-92).

• Media in Transition, General Editor, book series (MIT Press, 2003-08).

• Democracy and New Media, co-edited with Henry Jenkins (MIT Press, 2003).^{[7][17][18]}

• Rethinking Media Change, co-editor (MIT Press, 2003).^{[17]}

• Masterworks of Twentieth Century Fiction. DVD Lecture series. (The Teaching Company, Chantilly, VA., 2007; revised edition, 2009).

• The Film Experience (MIT OpenCourseWare, 2013). 24 lectures.

• Knots. poems. (Spuyten Duyvil Press, 2020).
