= William H. Pritchard =

American language and literary scholar and educator

Henry Clay Folger Professor William H. Pritchard Emeritus
- Born: William Harrison Pritchard, Jr. 1932 (age 92–93)
- Known for: Teaching, literary criticism

Academic background
- Education: 1953, A.B., Amherst College; 1956, M.A., Harvard University; 1960, Ph.D., Harvard University
- Thesis: The uses of nature; a study of Robert Frost's poetry (1960)

William H. Pritchard (born 1932) is an American literary critic and the Henry Clay Folger Professor of English, Emeritus, at Amherst College.

== Early life and education ==
William Harrison Pritchard, Jr., was born in 1932, the son of William H. Pritchard and Marion (LaGrange) Pritchard of Johnson City, New York. A graduate of Johnson City High School at age 16, he earned an A.B. in philosophy at Amherst College in 1953, and an M.A. (1956) and a Ph.D. in English (1960) at Harvard University, with the dissertation, The uses of nature; a study of Robert Frost's poetry.

Pritchard and Marietta Perl wed in August, 1957, in the Harvard University Chapel.

== Career ==
Pritchard began teaching at Amherst in 1958. His academic interests include American and British 20th century fiction, poetry and literary criticism.

== Selected publications ==
=== Books ===
- Pritchard, William H. (June 23, 2009). On Poets and Poetry. Swallow Press. ISBN 978-0804011150.
- Pritchard, William H. (2003). Shelf Life: Literary Essays and Reviews. University of Massachusetts Press. ISBN 978-1558493759.
- Pritchard, William H. (2000). Updike: America's Man of Letters. Steerforth Pres. ISBN 978-1586420024.
- Pritchard, William H. (1997). Lives of the Modern Poets. University Press of New England. ISBN 978-0874517873.
- Pritchard, William H. (1995). English Papers: A Teaching Life. Graywolf Press. ISBN 978-1555972349.
- Pritchard, William H. (1990). Randall Jarrell: A Literary Life. Farrar, Straus and Giroux. ISBN 978-0374246778.
- Pritchard, William H. (1984). Frost: A Literary Life Reconsidered. Oxford University Press. ISBN 978-0195034622.
- Gottesman, R.; Holland, L. B.; Kalstone, D.; Murphy, F; Parker, H.; Pritchard, W. H. (1980). The Norton anthology of American literature. New York: WW Norton & Company, Inc., New York. ISBN 0-393-95119-7.

=== Articles ===
- Pritchard, William H. (December 22, 1985). "John Ashbery and the Shock of the New". The Washington Post. ISSN 0190-8286.
- Pritchard, William H. (1995). Salwak, Dale; Moseley, Merritt; Fussell, Paul (eds.). "Appreciating Kingsley Amis". The Hudson Review. 48 (1): 137–144. doi:10.2307/3852071. ISSN 0018-702X. JSTOR 3852071.
- Pritchard, William H. (2003). Hitchens, Christopher; Orwell, George; Carey, John (eds.). "Orwell Matters". The Hudson Review. 56 (1): 183–190. doi:10.2307/3852935. ISSN 0018-702X. JSTOR 3852935.
- Pritchard, William H. (1975). Larkin, Philip (ed.). "Larkin Lives". The Hudson Review. 28 (2): 302–308. doi:10.2307/3850193. ISSN 0018-702X. JSTOR 3850193.
- Pritchard, William H. (2009). Huxley, Aldous; Sexton, James; Dee, Ivan R. (eds.). "Huxley in His Letters". The Sewanee Review. 117 (1): 121–125. ISSN 0037-3052. JSTOR 40211698.
- Pritchard, William H. (1976). "The Grip of Frost". The Hudson Review. 29 (2): 185–204. doi:10.2307/3849927. ISSN 0018-702X. JSTOR 3849927.
- Pritchard, William H. (1968). Dickey, James; Schorer, Mark (eds.). "Why Read Criticism?". The Hudson Review. 21 (3): 585–592. doi:10.2307/3849505. ISSN 0018-702X. JSTOR 3849505.
- Pritchard, William H. (2008). "Bishop's Time". The Hudson Review. 61 (2): 321–334. ISSN 0018-702X. JSTOR 20464863.
- Pritchard, William H. (1995). Eliot, T. S.; Schuchard, Ronald (eds.). "A Mind So Fine". The American Scholar. 64 (3): 452–456. ISSN 0003-0937. JSTOR 41212358.
- Pritchard, William H. (1994). "Reading Hawthorne". The Hudson Review. 46 (4): 757–764. doi:10.2307/3852140. ISSN 0018-702X. JSTOR 3852140.

== Awards, honors ==
- National Endowment for the Humanities Fellowship (1977-78, 1986)
- Guggenheim Foundation Fellowship (1973-1974)
- American Council of Learned Societies Junior Fellowship (1963-64); Fellowship (1977-78)
- Henry Clay Folger Professor of English (1984)

=== Scholarly and Professional Activities ===
- American Academy of Arts & Sciences (elected 2004)
- Association of Literary Scholars and Critics
