= Adam Begley =

American writer (born 1959)

- Born: Adam C. Begley; 1959 (age 66–67); Boston, Massachusetts, U.S.
- Education: Harvard College; Stanford University
- Occupation: Writer
- Parent(s): Sally (Higginson) and Louis Begley

Adam C. Begley (born 1959 in Boston, Massachusetts) is an American biographer. He was the books editor for The New York Observer from 1996 to 2009.

Begley is the son of Sally (Higginson) and novelist Louis Begley. He graduated from Harvard College in 1982, and from Stanford University with a Ph.D. in English and American literature in 1989. His work has appeared in The New York Times, The Guardian, The Times Literary Supplement, The Spectator, and The Atlantic.

Begley lives with his wife, Anne Cotton, in Great Gidding, Cambridgeshire. His stepdaughter is the novelist and art critic Chloë Ashby. He is the author of biographies of John Updike and the 19th-century French photographer Nadar. Begley's biography of Harry Houdini appeared in the Yale Jewish Lives series. Begley is a frequent contributor to the Paris Review's Art of Fiction series. He is currently at work on a book about Harvard College.

== Awards ==
- 2010: Guggenheim Fellowship
- 2011: Leon Levy Center for Biography Fellowship

== Works ==
- Literary Agents: A Writer's Guide. With Debby Mayer, Penguin Books, 1993, ISBN 978-0-14-017215-7
- "The Art of Fiction No. 135: Don DeLillo", Paris Review, Issue 128, Fall 1993
- The Salon.com Reader's Guide to Contemporary Authors, inter alia, Penguin Books, 2000, ISBN 978-0-14-028088-3
- "The Art of Fiction No. 173: Ian McEwan", Paris Review, Issue 162, Summer 2002
- "he Art of Fiction No. 179: Jim Crace", Paris Review, Issue 167, Fall 2003
- Certitude: A Profusely Illustrated Guide to Blockheads and Bullheads, Past and Present, with Christopher Hitchens, Illustrator Edward Sorel, HARMONY, 2009, ISBN 978-0-307-40804-4
- "The Art of Fiction No. 204: David Mitchell", Paris Review, Issue 193, Summer 2010
- "The Art of Fiction No. 236: Ali Smith", Paris Review, Issue 221, Summer 2017
- Updike, Harper-Collins, New York, 2014, ISBN 978-0-06-189645-3
- The Great Nadar: The Man Behind the Camera, New York: Tim Duggan Books, 2017, ISBN 978-1-10-190260-8
- Houdini: The Elusive American, New Haven: Yale University Press, 2020, ISBN 978-0-300-23079-6
