= List of fictional clergy and religious figures =

Clergy and other religious figures have generally represented a popular outlet for pop culture. Some of the more popular clergy, members of religious orders, and other religious personages featured in works of fiction are listed below.

== Christianity ==
=== Catholic Church ===
==== Monks and friars ====
- Frère Jacques
- The Monk – The Canterbury Tales by Geoffrey Chaucer
- Friar Tuck – Robin Hood
- Ambrosio – The Monk
- William of Baskerville – The Name of the Rose
- Brother Cadfael – protagonist of historical mystery novels by Ellis Peters

==== Nuns ====
- The Second Nun – The Canterbury Tales by Geoffrey Chaucer
- Sister Fidelma – protagonist of historical mystery novels by Peter Tremayne
- Ciel – Character from Tsukihime and the Melty Blood series
- Sister Jeanne – from The Devils
- Sister Bertrille (and several others) – from The Flying Nun
- Sister Boniface (and others) – from Sister Boniface Mysteries
- Sister Andrea – Evil (TV series)
- Sister Assumpta (and others) – Father Ted
- Sister Simone – from Mrs. Davis
- Sister Michael – from Derry Girls
- Maggie Grace – from Daredevil

==== Priests ====
- Claude Frollo – The Hunchback of Notre-Dame
  - Claude Frollo – from the Disney adaptation
- Father John Brown – created by G. K. Chesterton
- Father Ted Crilly – Father Ted
- Father Dámaso – Noli Me Tángere
- Mr. Eko – Lost
- Betheal Gavarre (Belial) – Priest manhwa
- Father Dougal McGuire – Father Ted TV series
- Father John Mulcahy – M*A*S*H TV series and film
- Father Burke – The Conjuring franchise
- Father Gordon – The Conjuring franchise
- The Nun's Priest – The Canterbury Tales by Geoffrey Chaucer
- The Pardoner – The Canterbury Tales by Geoffrey Chaucer
- The Parson – The Canterbury Tales by Geoffrey Chaucer
- Don Abbondio – The Betrothed by Alessandro Manzoni
- Father Guido Sarducci – Vatican gossip columnist played by comedian Don Novello on Saturday Night Live and other TV shows and films
- Don Camillo Tarocci – Giovannino Guareschi's tales
- Nicholas D. Wolfwood – Trigun
- Enrico Pucci – a chaplain at the Green Dolphin Street Prison aspiring to achieve Heaven for all mankind, friend of DIO, main antagonist of JoJo's Bizarre Adventure: Stone Ocean
- Kirei Kotomine – main antagonist of Fate/Stay Night, Fate/Zero and Fate/Stay Night: Unlimited Blade Works, also has minor appearances in Fate/Kaleid Liner Prisma Illya, Fate/Stay Night: Heaven's Feel and Fate/Grand Order
- Risei Kotomine – Kirei Kotomine's father, Fate/Zero
- John Ward – The main protagonist of Faith: The Unholy Trinity
- Father Garcia- Another protagonist of Faith: The Unholy Trinity
- Father David Acosta (and others) – Evil
- Father Jacob Myers (and others) – Apparitions
- Padre Manuel Vergara – 30 Coins
- Father Peter – Derry Girls
- The "Hot" Priest – Fleabag
- Damien Karras – A main character from The Exorcist
- Father Shiro Fujimoto - Rin and Yukio Okumura's adoptive father in Blue Exorcist
- Father Paul Lantom – Daredevil
- Father Salcedo – Lord, Give Me Patience
- Father Brian Kilkenney Finn – Keeping the Faith
- Father McKenzie - Eleanor Rigby

==== Bishops ====
- Bishop René d'Herblay of Vannes – the D'Artagnan Romances novels of Alexandre Dumas, père
- Bishop Len Brennan – Father Ted TV show

==== Popes ====
- Pope Andreas – legendary figure
- Pope Joan – 9th-century legendary figure
- Pope Urban X – Candide (1759 satire)
- Pope Hadrian VII – Hadrian the Seventh (1904 novel)
- Pope John XXIV – Lord of the World (1907 novel)
- Pope Sylvester III – Lord of the World (1907 novel)
- Pope Kiril I – The Shoes of the Fisherman (1968 film)
- Pope Sixtus VII – "Good News from the Vatican" (1971 short story)
- Pope Urban IX – Urban the Ninth (1973 novel)
- Pope Marx I – Marx the First (1975 novel)
- Pope Peter II – Peter the Second (1976 novel)
- Pope Germanian I (Martin Luther) – The Alteration (1976 novel)
- Pope Hadrian VII (Thomas More) – The Alteration (1976 novel)
- Pope John XXIV (implied to be Harold Wilson) – The Alteration (1976 novel)
- Pope Francis I – The Vicar of Christ (1979 novel)
- Pope Gregory XVII – Earthly Powers (1980 novel)
- Pope Gregory XVII – The Clowns of God (1981 novel)
- Pope Leo XIV – Saving Grace (1986 film)
- Pope John XXIX – "The Last Word" (1988 short story)
- Pope Leo XIV – Lazarus (1990 novel)
- Pope John Paul I (Cardinal Lamberto) – The Godfather Part III (1990 film)
- Pope David I – The Pope Must Die (1991 film)
- Pope Pius XX – 3001: The Final Odyssey (1997 novel)
- Pope Genevieve G. Rota – Lexx (1997 TV series)
- Pope Peter II – The Accidental Pope (2000 novel)
- Pope Oswald Leopold II – Battle Pope (2000 comic book series)
- Pope Peter II – The Third Secret (2005 novel)
- Pope Luke – Angels & Demons (2009 film)
- Pope Pius XIII – Oblivion (2012 novel)
- Pope Innocent XIV – Conclave (2016 novel) and Conclave (2024 film)
- Pope Marcellus IX – Through Darkest Europe (2018 novel)
- Pope Pius XIII – The Young Pope (2016 TV series) and The New Pope (2020 TV series)
- Pope Francis II – The New Pope (2020 TV series)
- Pope John Paul III – The New Pope (2020 TV series)

==== Saints ====
- Saint Grobian – A fictional patron saint of vulgar and coarse people in various late Medieval satirical works.
- Saint Xynoris – A fictional saint accidentally created through mistranslation.
- Saint Tibulus – A fictional saint created for the Father Ted episode: The Passion of St. Tibulus.

==== Other ====
- Dean Jocelin – Dean of the cathedral in William Golding's The Spire.

=== Eastern Orthodox Church ===
==== Monks ====
- Father Zosima – The Brothers Karamazov by Fyodor Dostoyevsky

==== Nuns ====
- Sister Pelagia – Pelagia and the White Bulldog and sequels by Boris Akunin

==== Saints ====
- Saint Javelin – A fictional Ukrainian saint who was used as a propaganda symbol in the Russo-Ukrainian War

=== Anglican/Episcopal churches ===
==== Priests ====
- William Collins – Pride and Prejudice, novel by Jane Austen; also several film and TV adaptations
- Leonard Clement – The Murder at the Vicarage, novel by Agatha Christie
- Theodore Venables – The Nine Tailors, novel by Dorothy L. Sayers
- Reverend Doctor Christopher Syn – Doctor Syn series of novels by Russell Thorndike
- Josiah Crawley – Chronicles of Barsetshire series of novels by Anthony Trollope
- Theophilus Grantly – Chronicles of Barsetshire series of novels by Anthony Trollope
- Dr Vesey Stanhope – Chronicles of Barsetshire series of novels by Anthony Trollope
- Mark Robarts – Chronicles of Barsetshire series of novels by Anthony Trollope
- Father Gabriel Stokes – The Walking Dead
- Ashley Thomas – Emmerdale
- Harriet Finch – Emmerdale
- Charles Anderson – Emmerdale
- Billy Mayhew – Coronation Street
- Adam Smallbone – Rev.
- Father Jack – Six Feet Under
- Sidney Chambers – Grantchester
- Daniel Webster – The Book of Daniel
- Canon John Tallis – works of Madeleine L'Engle
- Geraldine Granger — The Vicar of Dibley
- Alf Bloxby (books) / Jez Bloxby (TV) – Agatha Raisin (TV series)
- Reverend Green - Cluedo
- Ernest Trelaw - Timewyrm: Revelation
- Annie Trelaw - Happy Endings

==== Bishops ====
- Bishop Proudie of Barchester – Chronicles of Barsetshire series of novels by Anthony Trollope
- The Bishop of Tatchester - The Box of Delights

=== Mormonism ===
==== Fundamentalist leaders ====
- Bill Henrickson – Big Love
- Roman Grant – Big Love

=== Baptists ===
- Jesse Custer – Preacher, comic created by Garth Ennis and Steve Dillon
- Chaplain Captain Albert T. Tappman – Catch-22, novel by Joseph Heller

=== Methodists ===
- Father Mapple – Moby-Dick
- Brother Justin Crow – an aspiring radio preacher in Carnivàle
- Norman Balthus – Brother Justin's guardian and mentor in Carnivàle

=== Other Protestants ===
- Derrial Book, Shepherd – Firefly
- Caleb – Buffy the Vampire Slayer
- Eric Camden – 7th Heaven
- Ivan Isaacs – Priest
- Reverend Timothy Lovejoy – The Simpsons
- Reverend Harry Powell – The Night of the Hunter (1953)
- William Stryker – Marvel Comics
- Reverend Nathaniel Cole – Congregationalist minister in Hell on Wheels
- Ruth Cole – Congregationalist preacher in Hell on Wheels
- Joseph Black Moon – Congregationalist preacher in Hell on Wheels
- Reverend Orville Swanson – Congregationalist minister in Red Dead Redemption 2
- Reverend I. M. Jolly - Church of Scotland minister in Scotch and Wry
- Reverend Lloyd Meechum - Mama's Family, married Vint Harper and Naomi Oates; had the Hapers look after his incorrigible grandson

=== Unspecified Christian ===
- Prester John – Christian priest-king of medieval legend

== Shinto ==
=== Miko ===
(Names are listed by alphabetically by given name in the western convention of given-name, surname for clarity.)

- Arashi Kishū – X
- Ayako Matsuzaki – Ghost Hunt
- Chikane Himemiya and Himeko Kurusugawa – Kannazuki no Miko
- Kagome Higurashi, Kikyo, and Kaede – Inuyasha
- Kagami Hiiragi and Tsukasa Hiiragi – Lucky Star
- Kaho Mizuki – Cardcaptor Sakura
- Machi Amayadori – Kuma Miko: Girl Meets Bear
- Mitsuha Miyamizu – Your Name
- Momiji – Ninja Gaiden and Dead or Alive
- Nozomi Tojo – Love Live! School Idol Project
- Koyori – Samurai Aces
- Pocky – Pocky & Rocky
- Sailor Mars (Rei Hino) – Sailor Moon
- Sakura Miko – Hololive
- Rika Furude – Higurashi: When They Cry
- Ruka (Luka) Urushibara – Steins;Gate
- Reimu Hakurei and Sanae Kochiya – Touhou Project
- Sakura - Urusei Yatsura
- Sangonomiya Kokomi – Genshin Impact
- Saya Kisaragi – Blood-C
- Togashi – Sengoku Blade
- Princess Tomoyo – Tsubasa: Reservoir Chronicle
- Yae Miko – Genshin Impact
- Yae Sakura – Honkai Impact 3rd
- Utahime Iori – Jujutsu Kaisen

== Buddhism ==
=== Mahayana ===
==== Monks ====
- Kwai Chang Caine – Kung Fu
- Hoichi the Earless (Zen) – Japanese folklore
- Liu Kang – Mortal Kombat
- Kung Lao – Mortal Kombat

== Hinduism ==
=== Sadhu ===
Dhalsim – Street Fighter

== Shamanism ==
=== Ainu religion ===
- Nakoruru and Rimururu – Samurai Shodown

=== North American shamanism ===
- Nightwolf – Mortal Kombat

== Judaism ==
- Rabbi David Small – Friday the Rabbi Slept Late
- Rabbi Avram – The Frisco Kid
- Rabbi Jacob "Jake" Schram – Keeping the Faith
- Rabbi Hyman Krustofsky – The Simpsons

== Unclassified, fictional, or non-specific religions ==
- Adiris – Babylonian priestess, Dead by Daylight
- Otto Stamper – leader of The Fold, a cult residing in The Garden of Joy, responsible for summoning The Dredge, Dead by Daylight
- Abdul Alhazred – author of the Necronomicon, mentioned in various works by Howard Philips Lovecraft
- The Lamb – unnamed protagonist of the indie video game Cult of the Lamb
- The Vestal (Junia) – former priestess of an unknown church, Darkest Dungeon and Darkest Dungeon II
- The Occultist (Alhazred) – former leader of a cult, Darkest Dungeon and Darkest Dungeon II
- Bensheng – leader of Happiness Metta Power Group, a fictional cult, The Amazing Grace of Σ
- Lin Lu-ho – leader of New Spiritual Society, a cult residing in Penghu, The Pig, the Snake and the Pigeon
- Priest – Nameless ally who reverses transformations in Pizza Tower. Has a pizza printed on his biretta, but his exorcist counterpart uses a crucifix, suggesting he may be Christian.
- Rhea (Seiros) – Archbishop of the Church of Seiros, and later revealed to be the holy figure Seiros, in the game Fire Emblem: Three Houses. Also appears in the spin-off Fire Emblem Warriors: Three Hopes.
