= The Alteration =

1976 novel by Kingsley Amis

- Cover of first edition (hardcover)
- Author: Kingsley Amis
- Cover artist: Tom Adams
- Language: English
- Genre: Alternate history
- Publisher: Jonathan Cape
- Publication date: 1976
- Publication place: United Kingdom
- Media type: Print (hardback & paperback)
- Pages: 208
- ISBN: 0-224-01305-X
- OCLC: 2896009
- Dewey Decimal: 823/.9/14
- LC Class: PZ4.A517 Al PR6001.M6

The Alteration is a 1976 alternate history novel by British writer Kingsley Amis, set in a parallel universe in which the Reformation did not take place. It won the John W. Campbell Memorial Award in 1977.

== Creative origins ==
In his biography of Kingsley Amis, Richard Bradford devotes a chapter to The Alteration, its origins and context within the author's life. In 1973, Amis had heard a reproduction of the voice of Alessandro Moreschi, the last known European castrato. Amis disagreed with the proposition that Moreschi's performance could be considered "great art", because Moreschi had been castrated, and "true" art centred on the celebration of human sexuality.

Bradford argues that this was a matter of considerable importance for Amis himself, as he may have been suffering from impotence or sexual dysfunction in his marriage, due to advancing age. Thus, he took exception to Roman Catholic teaching, based as it was in a magisterium of celibate men.

== Plot ==
The main character, ten-year-old Hubert Anvil, is a chorister at St George's Basilica, Coverley (real world Cowley), for whom tragedy beckons when his teachers and the Church hierarchy, all the way up to the Pope himself, decree that the boy's superb voice is too precious to sacrifice to puberty. Despite his own misgivings, he must undergo castration, one of the two alterations of the title. Insight into this world is offered during Anvil's abortive escape from church authorities, with references to alternative world versions of known political and cultural figures. Hubert's mother carries on an illicit affair with the family chaplain, and his brother, Anthony, is a liberal dissident from repressive church policies.

In this timeline, there are two pivotal divergences from known history. Arthur Tudor and Catherine of Aragon's short-lived union produced a son, Stephen II of England. When Henry "the Abominable," Duke of York tried to usurp his nephew's throne, there was a papal crusade (the "War of the English Succession") to restore the rightful heir, culminating in the "Holy Victory" at Coverley, which was designated as the ecclesiastical capital of England.

Secondly, the Protestant Reformation did not take place as Martin Luther was reconciled to the Roman Catholic Church and later became Pope Germanian I. Luther's anti-Semitism may have infected this history to a greater extent during his papacy, as the novel discloses that Jews are forced to seclude themselves and wear yellow stars to advertise their religious and ethnic identity. In this history, Thomas More did not marry, and ascended to the Papacy as Pope Hadrian VII.

While the Papacy still holds sway across Western Europe, in this version of the twentieth century Protestantism is limited to the breakaway Republic of New England, which includes such locations as Cranmeria (named after Thomas Cranmer), Hussville (named for Jan Huss), Waldensia (Waldensians) and Wyclif City (John Wycliffe). The head of the schismatic church in New England is the Archpresbyter of Arnoldstown (named after Benedict Arnold). Joseph Rudyard Kipling held office as "First Citizen" from 1914 to 1918, while Edgar Allan Poe was an acclaimed general who died at the moment of his victory over the combined forces of Louisiana and Mexico in the war of 1848–1850. We learn towards the end of the book that this Protestant state also has unpleasant features, such as practising apartheid towards Native Americans and a harsh penal system.

England dominates the British Isles with Ireland being called "West-England" and Scotland being annexed to England as "North-England". Instead of parliamentary democracy, the English Isles are administered by a Convocation of clergy accountable to the Catholic hierarchy. The rule of the Church is absolute and totalitarian, controlled by the Holy Office, a sort of KGB or Gestapo equivalent. (Monsignors Henricus and Laurentius – Heinrich Himmler and Lavrentiy Beria – are mentioned in passing.)

The state of the world is illustrated in a description of national, clerical and royal figures at the funeral of Stephen III, late King of England, which opens the book. There is reference to the Kings of Portugal, Sweden, Naples and Lithuania, which suggests that no Italian nation-state exists in this history due to the temporal strength of the Papacy. The Crown Prince of Muscovy is also mentioned, suggesting that Tsarism holds sway, and the Dauphin leads one to conclude that the French monarchy is also still in existence. Germany is a nation-state, known as Almaigne and ruled by an Emperor, although it may not have exactly the same national boundaries. The "Vicar General" of the "Emperor Patriarch" of Candia suggests that the Greek Orthodox Church survives as a separate ecclesiastical jurisdiction, albeit exiled from its native Greece (which is still under Ottoman domination) and with its headquarters in Crete. Finally, this opening section cites the "Viceroys" of India, Brazil and New Spain, suggesting that colonialism and direct imperialism are still realities here.

A Christian/Muslim cold war exists between the Papacy and the Ottoman Empire. Described as a war against an opponent that can never be destroyed and which can be held in check only by maintaining permanent armies and fleets, it serves the useful purpose of distracting any tendency to rebel or question. Pope John XXIV is a Machiavellian Yorkshireman, who allows the cold war to heat up as a Malthusian plot to resolve Europe's population growth – the church has access to bacteriological warfare as an alternative to birth control, whose prior papal prohibition John XXIV opposes. The book's coda, set in 1991, fifteen years after the events of the main body of the book, reveals that events have turned out as the Pope planned. Europe's surplus population has become cannon fodder for the war, which ended in a narrow victory although the Ottoman Empire got as far as Brussels. However, one of Hubert's childhood friends, Decuman, is mentioned as being among the occupation troops in Adrianople in far western Turkey, suggesting that the Ottomans either lost the war, or at least were forced to make significant territorial concessions to the Catholic West.

William Shakespeare's work was suppressed in this history, although Thomas Kyd's original text of Hamlet has survived, and is still performed in 1976 (albeit only in New England). Shelley lived until 1853, at which point he set fire to Castel Gandolfo outside Rome and perished. By contrast, Wolfgang Amadeus Mozart, Ludwig van Beethoven, William Blake, David Hockney, and Holman Hunt have allowed their talents to submit to religious authority. Edward Bradford argues that the choice of authors and musicians here is not meant to imply Amis's own preferences, but questions the value of art subordinated to a destructive ideology that represses sexual freedom and human choice. Underscoring the clerical domination of this world, Hubert's small collection of books includes a set of Father Bond novels (an amalgam of Father Brown and James Bond), as well as Lord of the Chalices (The Lord of the Rings), Saint Lemuel's Travels (Gulliver's Travels), and The Wind in the Cloisters (The Wind in the Willows). There is also reference to a Monsignor Jean-Paul Sartre of the Jesuits, and A. J. Ayer (who was in real life a noted atheist) is Professor of Dogmatic Theology at New College, Oxford.

"Science" is literally a dirty word, and while "invention" is not, the scope of inventors is severely limited. Electricity has been banned; the only form of internal combustion engine permitted is the Diesel, which works without a spark. Some of the incidental pleasure of the book is in the "alternative technology" reminiscent of Amis's friend and fellow-author Harry Harrison, such as the high-speed train that takes characters from London to Rome in just seven hours, via Thomas Sopwith's Channel Bridge. Airships feature as a mode of transportation connecting Europe with Africa and North America, with heavier-than-air vehicles being exclusive to New England.

Allusion to known historical figures include the political scene in Britain in the 1970s, and may reflect Amis's increasingly conservative attitudes. For example, Lord Stansgate (Tony Benn) presides over the Holy Office, and Officers Paul Foot and Corin Redgrave are two of its feared operatives. Pope John XXIV is a thinly disguised Harold Wilson and his Secretary of State is Enrico Berlinguer. Other references are more obscure; opera-lovers with a good knowledge of Latin will, however, be able to identify the two castrati from the Vatican, Federicus Mirabilis and Lupigradus Viaventosa, as the German singers Fritz Wunderlich and Wolfgang Windgassen, both recently deceased when Amis was writing.

== Alternative parallel-world novels within The Alteration ==
Just as The Man in the High Castle features a book titled The Grasshopper Lies Heavy, depicting a world (but not our own) in which the Axis powers lost World War II, so The Alteration refers to an alternate history book by one Philip K. Dick entitled The Man in the High Castle. This book-within-a-book depicts a world in which Stephen II was never born, so the "Holy Victory" never happened, and Henry VIII became king legitimately. As in reality, Henry married Catherine of Aragon, but their son Henry, Duke of Cornwall survived infancy, becoming Henry IX in 1547. Martin Luther became "schismatic" in this world, as he did in reality, and a "Union" of former English North American colonies breaks away in 1848 instead of 1776, conquering most of North America. The same book also features the publication of The Origin of Species, the widespread application of electricity including in aviation, and Beethoven's composing of twenty symphonies before his death in 1835.

Galliard, an alternative-universe counterpart to Keith Roberts's Pavane, is also mentioned in this tribute to the subgenre. (The Galliard and the Pavane were both forms of Renaissance dance.)
