= Juventinus and Maximinus =

Saints Juventius and Maximus

Saints, Martyrs
- Venerated in: Catholicism, Eastern Orthodox Church
- Feast: 25 January (Western Christianity); 9 October (Eastern Orthodoxy)

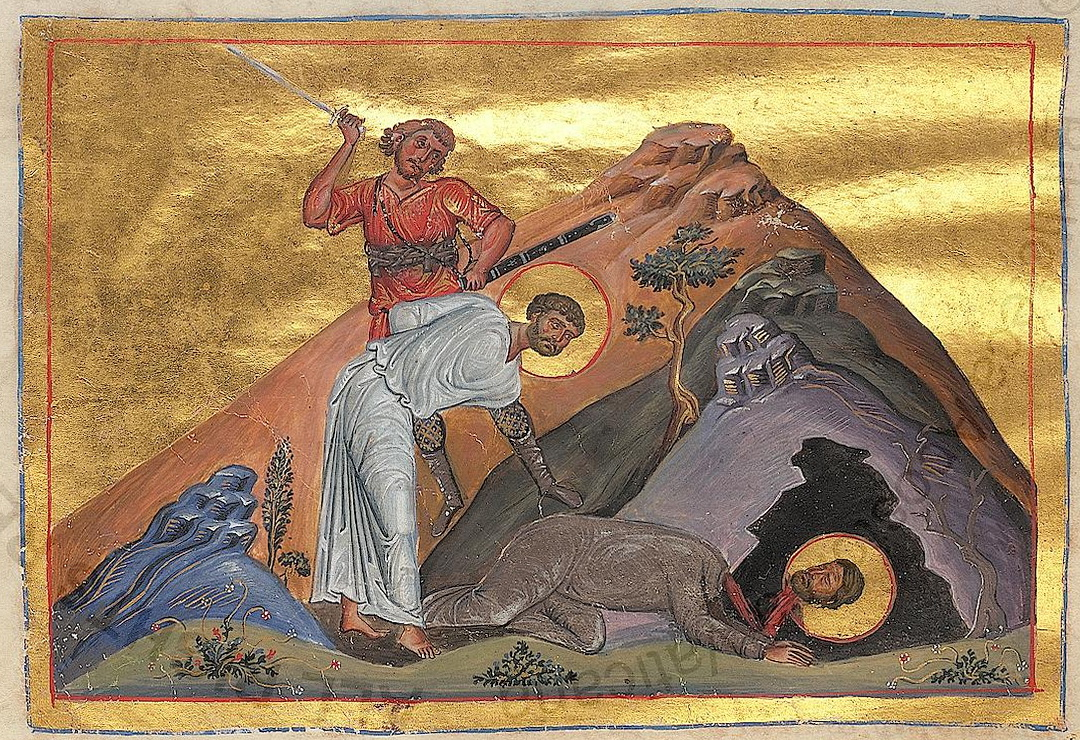
The beheading of Juventinus and Maximinus

Saints Juventinus (or Juventius) and Maximinus (died 29 January 363) were Christian martyrs and members of the imperial guard of Emperor Julian. Their feast day is 25 January.

Before starting his campaign against the Sassanid Empire, Julian issued an edict that prohibited the veneration of the relics in Antioch. He also gave orders to sprinkle all the foodstuffs in the marketplace and the water in the wells with blood offered to idols. Juventius and his colleague Maximinus (also reported as Maximos or Maximus) let fall at a banquet comments on the emperor's laws against the Christians, "Does life make any sense nowadays? All things holy are despoiled. Our faith in the Lord of Creation is treated with contempt and disgrace. Wherever one is, one inhales the ugly smell of animal fat and sacrificial meat. Nowhere can one find any fresh air."

Being informed of this, the emperor sent for them, but could not persuade them to retract what they had said, nor to sacrifice to the gods. According to the Roman Martyrology, Julian had them stripped of their properties, beaten and beheaded.

Saint John Chrysostom wrote a panegyric concerning them. Chrysostom makes the point that they were executed in the middle of the night on a charge of high treason, as Julian did not want to make martyrs of them by suggesting they died because of their faith. The Roman historian Ammianus Marcellinus makes no mention of Juventinus and Maximinus, nor does Gregory of Nazianzus or church historian Socrates of Constantinople.

Italian scholar Pio Franchi de Cavalieri has put forth that The Passion of Sergius and Bacchus was based on an earlier lost passion of Juventinus and Maximinus. He alleged that the author took material from the stories of martyrs of Julian's time rather than that of Galerius, under whom Sergius and Bacchus were claimed to have been martyred.

== See also ==
- Xynoris – a fictional saint once erroneously thought to have been martyred alongside Juventinus and Maximinus
