= Lord of the World =

1907 novel by Robert Hugh Benson

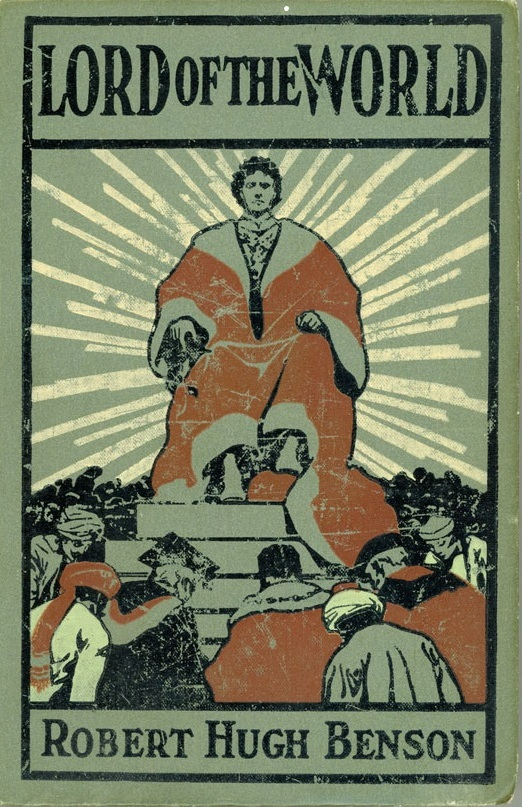
- Author: Robert Hugh Benson
- Language: English
- Genre: Dystopian novel, Christian novel
- Publisher: Dodd, Mead and Company
- Publication date: 1907
- Publication place: United Kingdom
- Media type: Print (hardcover)
- Pages: 352 pp
- LC Class: PR6003 .E7 L6
- Text: Lord of the World at Wikisource

Lord of the World is a 1907 dystopian science fiction novel by the English Catholic priest Robert Hugh Benson that centres upon the reign of the Antichrist, which is enabled by a movement towards global peace and the unification of religious and political thought. It has been called prophetic by Popes Benedict XVI, Francis, and Leo XIV.

== Plot ==
In the early 21st-century, with the Tories (rebranded as "Individualists") in decline, the British Empire is functionally a one-party state. The British royal family has been deposed, and Esperanto is widely spoken. Marxism, atheism, liberalism and secular humanism dominate culture and politics.

The world now has only three main religious forces: Catholicism, Humanitarianism, and the Eastern religions. Humanitarianism is essentially atheism, but has adopted the creed that "God is Man." Rome was given entirely to the Pope, who then instituted the death penalty for offenses including adultery and apostasy. The world is otherwise divided into three superstates: a loosely organized European Confederation of socialist states and their colonies in Africa, bound together by Free Trade but on the verge of consolidating under a European parliament; the Eastern Empire, which includes Asia, Australia, and New Zealand; and the American Republic, consisting of both North and South America. The European Confederation and Eastern Empire are on the brink of war.

Oliver Brand, an influential MP from Croydon, is among the most ardent opponents of Catholicism. Oliver's wife Mabel witnesses a volor (flying transport) crash. As the government's Ministers of Euthanasia arrive and finish off the wounded, she sees a priest, Percy Franklin, give Last Rites to a dying Catholic. Traumatised by what she witnessed, Mabel tells Oliver that both the priest and the dying man seemed to believe in what they were doing. Oliver explains the Catholic belief in the afterlife in a dismissive way, and Mabel is mollified.

A mysterious Senator Felsenburgh unexpectedly takes charge of the American Republic's peace delegation and travels the Empire, delivering speeches to rapt audiences in their own languages. Due to Felsenburgh's efforts, world peace is secured. Oliver urges Mabel to accompany him to the announcement, where Felsenburgh will be. With them away, Oliver's secretary, Mr. Phillips, summons Franklin to the house. He explains that Oliver's elderly mother used to be Catholic and wishes to return to the Church before her imminent death. Franklin meets Mrs. Brand and receives her back into the Church. The Brands return home and find Franklin there. To Oliver's shock, Franklin appears physically identical to Felsenburgh. Mabel urges Franklin to leave in peace. She explains that he will see Felsenburgh and the overflowing joy that his arrival has occasioned. On his way home, Franklin encounters a rally being addressed by Felsenburgh. The priest is tempted to believe in him.

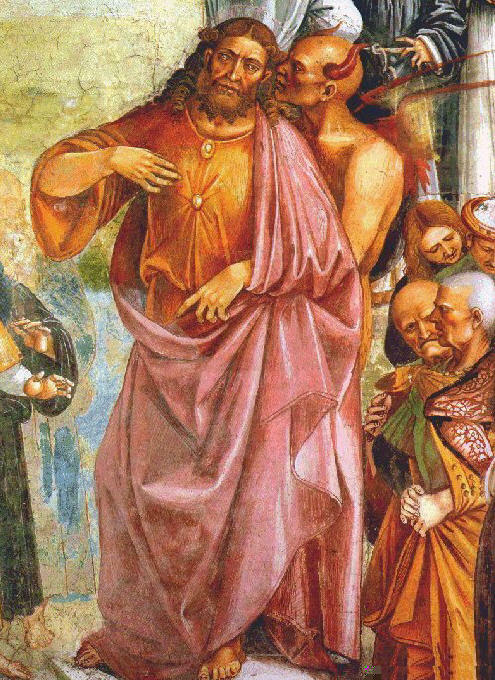
Antichrist and the Devil. Detail from the Deeds of the Antichrist fresco by Luca Signorelli, c. 1501.

While Oliver is away, Mrs. Brand takes a turn for the worse. Ignoring Mabel's sermons against Christianity, Mrs. Brand pleads for Franklin to be summoned. Mabel has her involuntarily euthanised, knowing that Oliver would desire it.

Felsenburgh accepts the post of President of Europe. There is great rejoicing throughout Europe. The Cardinal Protector of England dies, and Franklin is chosen to succeed him. Under Franklin's recommendation, the pope creates an Order of Christ Crucified to spread Catholicism in the face of persecution, an order with no habit or badge, "freer than the Jesuits, poorer than the Franciscans, more mortified than the Carthusians". Many join the new order and are martyred throughout the world.

The Parliaments of Europe institute weekly Humanist ceremonies. Attendance is optional except for the four annual festivals of Maternity, Life, Sustenance, and Paternity. Oliver becomes Minister of Public Worship in England, planning the ceremonies with an ex-priest, John Francis.

The new religion outrages Catholics. Phillips arrives in Rome with news that English and German Catholics are plotting a suicide bombing of the abbey where Felsenburgh's inner circle meets. Franklin and Cardinal Steinmann of Germany leave for their respective homelands to try to prevent the bombing. Having also learned of the plot, the English and German governments send a squadron of volors which destroy Rome in retaliation.

In London, mobs crucify Christians and lynch priests, shaking Mabel's faith in Humanitarianism. Oliver attempts to console her, explaining that England needs to be purged of Christianity, and admits that the police have been ordered to stand down.

At the Feast of Maternity, Felsenburgh enters the Cathedral dressed in the red and black robes of a British High Court judge and laments the destruction of Rome and the recent pogroms against Christians. He leads the assembled worshipers in prayer to the "Mother of us all". Those present acclaim Felsenburgh as God.

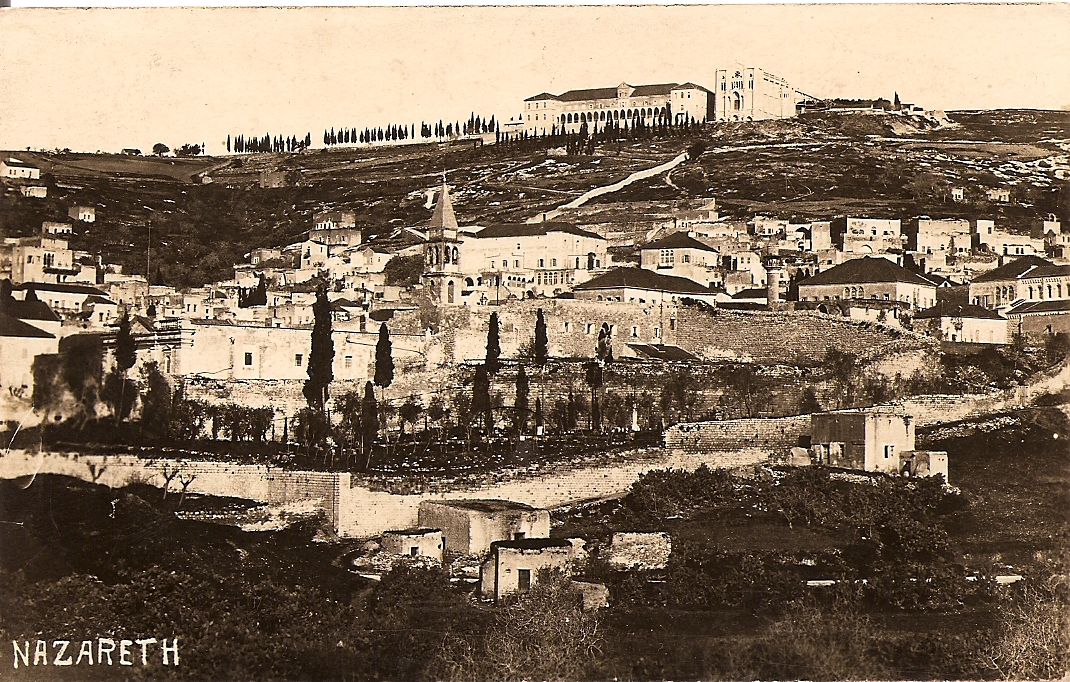
Nazareth, c. 1900.

Cardinals Franklin and Steinmann travel to the deathbed of the only other living cardinal. They hold a Papal Conclave, and Franklin is elected Pope, taking the name Sylvester III. Pope Sylvester reorganises the Church to operate in secrecy. He rebuilds the College of Cardinals, and his name and location (Nazareth) are known only to them.

Felsenburgh orders that everyone either disavow the existence of God or be executed. Unable to bear the mass executions, Mabel leaves her husband and checks into a euthanasia clinic. Oliver tries in vain to find her. After the mandatory eight-day waiting period, Mabel writes a suicide letter to Oliver and kills herself.

Cardinal Dolgorovski converts to Humanitarianism and informs the government of a secret meeting between Franklin and the remaining cardinals, so Felsenburgh plans to destroy Nazareth. Pope Sylvester receives word of Dolgorovski's suspicious behavior and warns the city's residents to flee, but remains with the cardinals and offers Mass followed by Eucharistic Adoration. As firebombs rain down on Nazareth, Pope Sylvester and the cardinals chant the Pange Lingua before a Host exposed in a monstrance on the altar. The novel ends: "Then this world passed, and the glory of it".

== Background ==
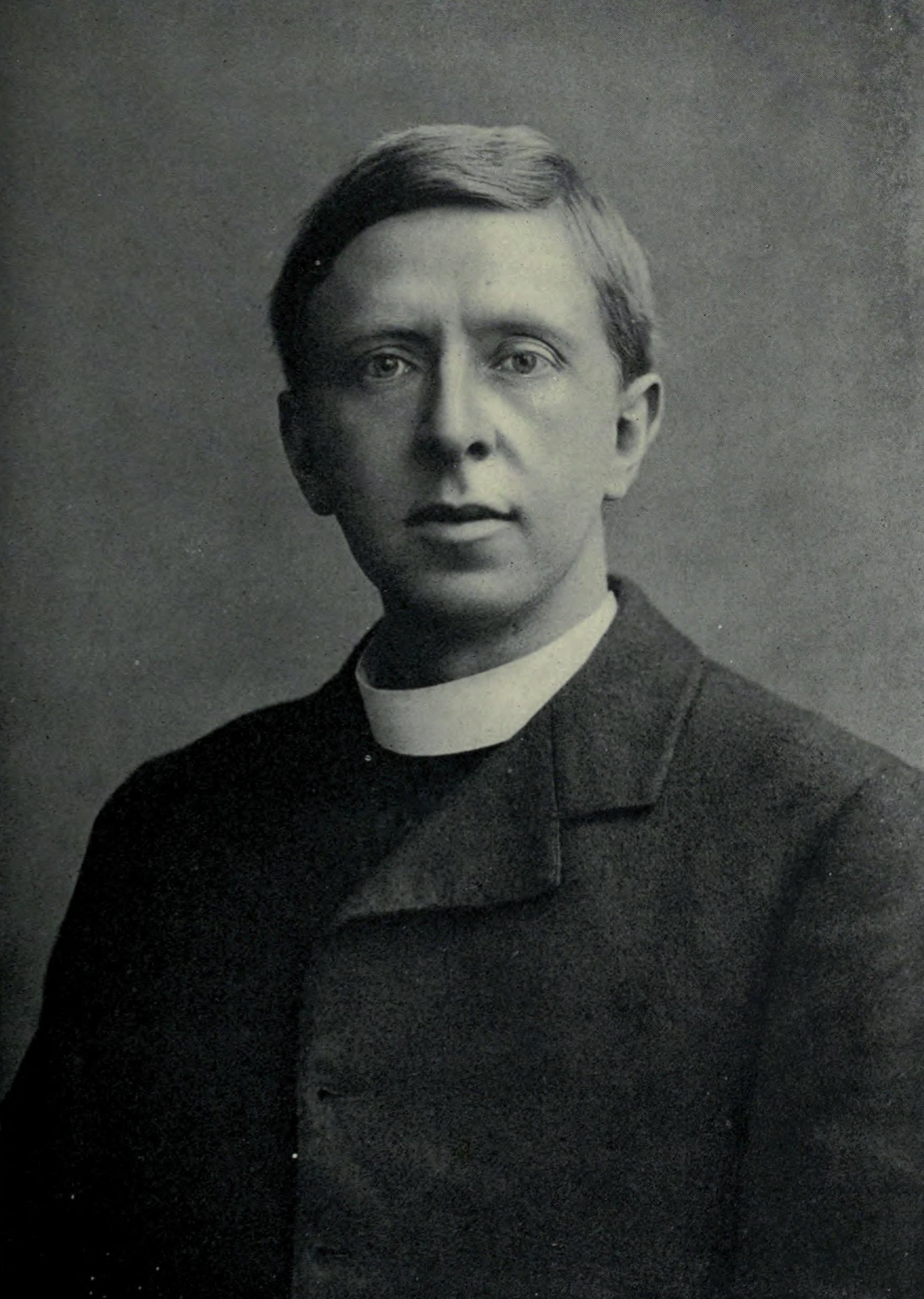
Robert Hugh Benson at the time of Lord of the World's 1907 publication

Monsignor Robert Hugh Benson, a former High Church Anglican priest, began writing Lord of the World two years after his conversion to Roman Catholicism rocked the Church of England in 1903.

The youngest son of the Archbishop of Canterbury, Edward White Benson, and the society hostess Mary Sidgwick Benson, Benson was descended from a very long line of Anglican clergy. He had also read the litany at his father's 1896 funeral at Canterbury Cathedral and was widely expected to one day take his father's place as the most senior cleric in the Anglican Communion. After a crisis of faith described in his 1913 memoir Confessions of a Convert, however, Benson was received into the Catholic Church on 11 September 1903.

According to Joseph Pearce, "The press made much of the story that the son of the former Archbishop of Canterbury had become a Catholic, and the revelation rocked the Anglican establishment in a way reminiscent of the days of the Oxford Movement and the conversion of Newman."

Benson was inundated with hate mail from Anglican clergy, men, women, and children. He was accused of being "a deliberate traitor", "an infatuated fool", and of bringing dishonour upon his father's name and memory. Although he replied scrupulously to every letter, Benson was deeply hurt. He later wrote that he received considerable solace in the words that an Anglican bishop had spoken to his mother, "Remember that he has followed his conscience after all, and what else could his father wish for him than that?"

After his ordination as a Catholic priest in Rome in 1904, Benson was assigned as a Catholic chaplain at Cambridge University. It was during his time in Cambridge that Lord of the World was conceived and written.

=== Inception ===
According to Benson's biographer, Cyril Martindale, the idea of a novel about the Antichrist was first suggested to him in December 1905 by his friend and literary mentor Frederick Rolfe, who also introduced him to the writings of Claude Henri de Rouvroy, comte de Saint-Simon, a French Utopian Socialist.

According to Martindale, as Benson read Saint-Simon's writings, "A vision of a dechristianised civilisation, sprung from the wrecking of the old régime, arose before him and he listened to Mr. Rolfe's suggestion that he should write a book on Antichrist."

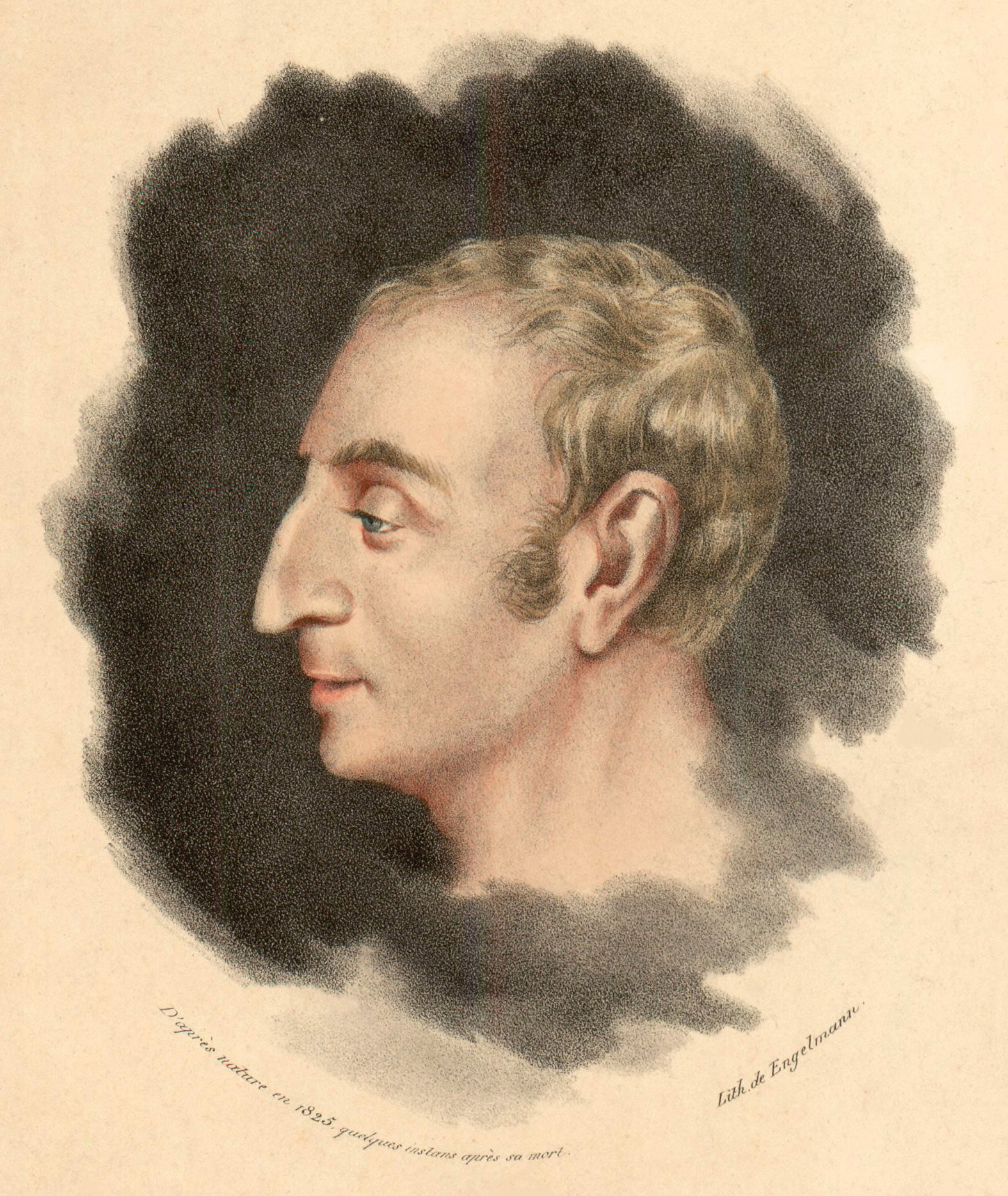
French Utopian Socialist Henri de Saint-Simon, c. 1820

Writing during the pontificate of Pope Pius X and before the First World War, Benson accurately predicted interstate highways, weapons of mass destruction, the use of aircraft to drop bombs on both military and civilian targets, and passenger air travel in advanced Zeppelins called "Volors". Writing in 1916, Martindale compared Benson's ideas for future technology with those of the French science fiction novelist Jules Verne.

Like many other Catholics of the era in which he wrote, Benson believed in Masonic conspiracy theories and shared the political and economic views of G. K. Chesterton and Hilaire Belloc.

== Influences ==
Benson drew upon history, other works of science fiction, and current events to create a fictional universe.

=== Literature ===
Frederick Rolfe's anti-Modernist satirical novel Hadrian VII inspired numerous aspects of Lord of the World, including the introductory first chapter.

According to his biographer, Cyril Martindale, Benson's depiction of the future was in many ways an inversion of the science fiction novels of H. G. Wells. Like many other Christians of the era, Benson was sickened by Wells' belief that Atheism, Marxism, World Government, and Eugenics would lead to an earthly utopia. Due to his depiction of a Wellsian future as a murderous global police state, Benson's novel has been called one of the first modern works of dystopian science fiction.

=== History ===
A further source of inspiration was Benson's interest in history.

Percy Franklin's constant fear of arrest while carrying out his priestly ministry in London is inspired by Benson's research into the aftermath of the English Reformation—indeed, Benson would later write a historical novel, Come Rack! Come Rope! (1912), set during that time. Franklin's suspicion that Francis may have become a police informant and his belief that Mrs. Brand's request for a priest is a trap to ensnare him are reminiscent of the tactics used by Elizabethan Era priest hunters like Sir Richard Topcliffe.

Julian Felsenburgh's leadership style was modelled after that of Napoleon Bonaparte, whose mistakes he was intended to correct. In one of the three notebooks he kept while writing Lord of the World, Benson wrote that while Napoleon's weakness was "his soft heart: he forgave," Felsenburgh, "never forgives: for political crime he strips of position, making the man incapable of holding office; for treachery to himself he drops them out of his councils." He further described the Anti-Christ as "complete hardness, and kindness".

The word, "Recusants", which Franklin uses to describe Catholics who absent themselves from compulsory Humanist worship, dates from the reign of Queen Elizabeth I of England. The word was originally used to describe both Catholics and Puritans who, despite heavy fines and imprisonment, refused to attend weekly Anglican services.

As acknowledged in the text, the character of Cardinal Dolgorovski of Moscow is inspired by Judas Iscariot.

The word Test Act for Felsenburgh's legislative means to root out Catholicism is no invention of his or of his author. There were Test Acts passed in England intended for that purpose.

=== Current events ===
Further inspiration was gleaned from Benson's following of current events.

The fear among Europeans of the Eastern Empire and its ruler, the Son of Heaven, is inspired by the shock that greeted the territorial expansion of the Japanese Empire before, during, and after the Russo-Japanese War.

The dystopian Marxist Government of Britain is inspired by the events of the British general election of 1906. Prior to the election, a large number of small left wing political parties consolidated to form a unified bloc called the Labour Party, which won 29 seats in the House of Commons. The first chapter, which describes the overthrow of the British royal family, the abolition of the House of Lords, the disestablishment of the Church of England, and the closing of the universities is inspired by the Labour Party's platform at the time the novel was written.

The Marxist uprising that topples the Son of Heaven is inspired by the Russian Revolution of 1905, which Benson was following in the newspapers.

Julian Felsenburgh's sermon at St. Paul's and the emotional reaction of his listeners are inspired by press reports of the Reverend Evan Roberts and the 1904-1905 Welsh Revival. Rev. Roberts was similarly able to provoke public displays of emotion in his listeners and is regarded as the inventor of Pentecostalism. He was also the focus of a cult of personality which scandalised more traditional churches. At the height of his ministry, Rev. Roberts' denunciations of literary and cultural societies, competitive sports, and alcohol consumption temporarily caused a sea change in Welsh culture. Countless rugby teams and literary societies were voluntarily disbanded. In Welsh coal mining towns, pubs closed down for lack of business and the National Eisteddfod of Wales was almost deserted. Rev. Roberts, however, eventually came to believe that his ministry was not of God, voluntarily left the public eye, and spent the remaining years of his life resisting efforts to draw him back to the revival circuit. He died, a virtual recluse, in 1951.

The Anti-Catholic riots that follow the discovery of the planned suicide bombing are inspired by Anti-Jewish Pogroms in the Russian Empire, which also took place with the collusion of senior Government officials and policemen.

== Composition ==
Benson first mentioned his ideas in a letter to his mother on 16 December 1905, "Yes, Russia is ghastly. Which reminds me that I have an idea for a book so vast and tremendous that I daren't think about it. Have you ever heard of Saint-Simon? Well, mix up Saint-Simon, Russia breaking loose, Napoleon, Evan Roberts, the Pope and Antichrist; and see if any idea suggests itself. But I'm afraid it is too big. I should like to form a syndicate on it, but that is an idea, I have no doubt at all."

In a letter to Rolfe on 19 January 1906, Benson wrote, "Anti-Christ is beginning to obsess me. If it is ever written, it will be a BOOK. How much do you know about the Freemasons? Socialism? I am going to avoid scientific developments, and confine myself to social. This election seems to hold vast possibilities in the direction of Anti-Christ's Incarnation – I think he will be born of a virgin. Oh! If I dare to write all that I think! In any case, it will take years."

According to Martindale, the gradual evolution of Lord of the World can be charted through three of Benson's notebooks. The first two reveal that Benson based the physical appearances of Percy Franklin and President Julian Felsenburgh on "a rather prominent socialist politician" whose name Martindale does not disclose. Benson's notebooks also reveal that Pope Sylvester was originally "made to take refuge and confront Antichrist in Ireland."

On 16 May 1906, Benson wrote in his diary, "Anti-Christ is going forward; and Rome is about to be destroyed. Oh, it is hard to keep it up! It seems to me that I am getting terser and terser until finally the entire story will end in a gap, like a stream disappearing in sand. It is such a fearful lot that one might say, that every word seems irrelevant."

On 28 June 1906, Benson again wrote in his diary, "I HAVE FINISHED ANTI-CHRIST. And really there is no more to be said. Of course I am nervous about the last chapter – it is what one may call just a trifle ambitious to describe the End of the World. (No!) But it has been done."

In a 28 January 1907 letter, Lord of the World was praised by Frederick Rolfe. Commenting on Benson's decision to satirise him as "Chris Dell" in The Sentimentalists, Rolfe wrote, "You are worrying yourself most unnecessarily about me, I assure you... I am laughing at the absurdity of the whole thing though I must confess that I was rather amazed when I heard that everybody recognized me in Chris. It was rather a blow to my amour propre... You will, I hope, reap a rich harvest of shekels from the transaction, and the world will forget The Sentimentalists when it stands wondering before The Lord of the World."

=== Textual error in modern editions ===
Most modern editions of Lord of the World contain an error in Book III, Chapter Five, Section III, carried forward from a printer's error in the American edition of the book. A sentence in the second paragraph of Section III began as follows, in the British first edition:

In short, it seemed that he could do no good by remaining in England, and the temptation to be present at the final act of justice in the East by which those who had indirectly been the cause of his tragedy were to be wiped out…

In the corrupted text found in most modern editions, the passage reads (erroneous portion in italics):

In short, it seemed that he could do no good by remaining in England, and the temptation to be present at the final act of justice in the East by which land, and, in fact, it was more than likely that if she were to be wiped out…

== Release and reception ==
Upon its 1907 publication, Lord of the World caused an enormous stir among Catholics, non-Catholic Christians, and even among non-Christians. Benson was therefore kept busy answering letters from both readers and literary critics. Benson's reading of these letters helped inspire his novel The Dawn of All.

In reply to a critic who expressed a belief that Mabel Brand condemned herself to Hell by committing suicide, Benson wrote, "I think Mabel was alright, really. Honestly, she had no idea that suicide was a sin; and she did pray as well as she knew how at the end."

In a 16 December 1907 letter to Benson's brother A. C. Benson, British physicist Sir Oliver Lodge wrote, "The assumption that there can be no religion except a grotesque return to Paganism, short of admitting the supremacy of Mediaeval Rome, is an unexpected contention to find in a modern book... I am wondering what the leaders of the Church think of it. Perhaps Pius X may approve; but it is difficult to suppose that it can meet with general approbation. If it does, it is very instructive."

Some critics and readers misinterpreted the novel's last sentence as meaning, "the destruction, not of the world, but of the Church." Some Marxists were reportedly "delighted" by the ending and one non-Catholic reader wrote that Lord of the World had, "struck heaven out of my sky, and I don't know how to get it back again."

Other readers were more admiring. Although "grave exception" was taken there to Benson's "sympathetic treatment" of Mabel Brand's suicide, Lord of the World was enthusiastically received in France.

In a letter to Benson, Jesuit priest Joseph Rickaby wrote, "I have long thought that Antichrist would be no monster, but a most charming, decorous, attractive person, exactly your Felsenburgh. This is what the enemy has wanted, something to counteract the sweetness of Christmas, Good Friday, and Corpus Christi, which is the strength of Christianity. The abstruseness of Modernism, the emptiness of Absolutism, the farce of Humanitarianism, the bleakness (so felt by Huxley and Oliver Lodge) of sheer physical science, that is what your Antichrist makes up for. He is, as you have made him, the perfection of the Natural, away from and in antithesis to God and His Christ.... As Newman says, a man may be near death and yet not die, but still the alarms of his friends are each time justified and are finally fulfilled; so of the approach of Antichrist."

Shortly after Benson's novel was published, British historian and future Catholic convert Christopher Dawson paid a visit to Imperial Germany. While there, Dawson witnessed the increasing de-Christianisation of German culture and the rapid growth of the Marxist Social Democratic Party. In response, Dawson called the Kaiser's Germany "a most soul-destroying place", and complained that German intellectuals, "examine Christianity as if it were a kind of beetle." Dawson further lamented that his stay in that "most dreadful" country reminded him of "the state of society in Lord of the World."

Furthermore, despite Benson's subtle contempt for "Greek Christianity", Mother Catherine Abrikosova, a Byzantine Catholic Dominican nun, former Marxist, and future martyr in Joseph Stalin's concentration camps, translated Lord of the World from English to Russian shortly before the Bolshevik Revolution.

== Legacy ==
=== Catholic intellectuals ===
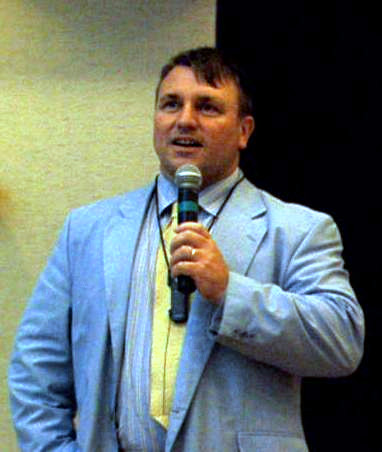
Joseph Pearce, 2007.

Although it is not as well known as the dystopian writings of Evgeny Zamyatin, George Orwell, Ray Bradbury and Aldous Huxley, Lord of the World continues to have many admirers—especially among Conservative and Traditionalist Catholics.

In a 2005 essay, Joseph Pearce wrote that, while Orwell and Huxley's novels are "great literature", they "are clearly inferior works of prophecy." Pearce explains that while "the political dictatorships" that inspired Huxley and Orwell "have had their day", "Benson's novel-nightmare... is coming true before our very eyes."

Pearce elaborates,

The world depicted in Lord of the World is one where creeping secularism and godless humanism have triumphed over traditional morality. It is a world where philosophical relativism has triumphed over objectivity; a world where, in the name of tolerance, religious doctrine is not tolerated. It is a world where euthanasia is practiced widely and religion hardly practiced at all. The lord of this nightmare world is a benign-looking politician intent on power in the name of "peace", and intent on the destruction of religion in the name of "truth". In such a world, only a small and shrinking Church stands resolutely against the demonic "Lord of the World".

EWTN talk show host and American Chesterton Society President Dale Ahlquist has also praised Benson's novel and said that it deserves a wider audience.

Michael D. O'Brien's has cited it as an influence on his Apocalyptic series Children of the Last Days.

=== Papal statements ===
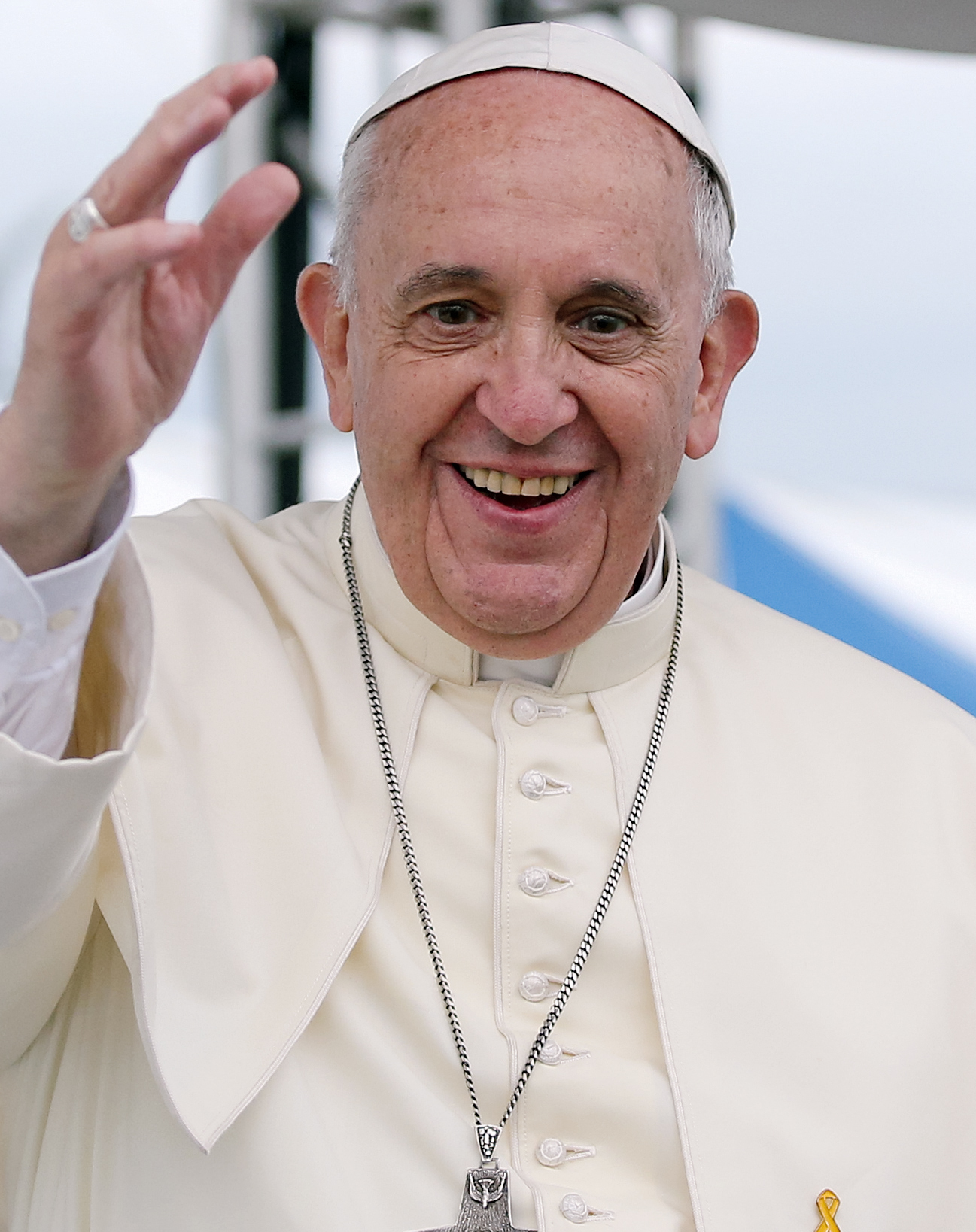
Pope Francis

On February 8, 1992, Cardinal Joseph Ratzinger criticised U. S. President George H. W. Bush's recent speech calling for "a New World Order" in a speech of his own at the Università Cattolica del Sacro Cuore. In his discourse, the future Pope explained that Benson's novel described "a similar unified civilization and its power to destroy the spirit. The anti-Christ is represented as the great carrier of peace in a similar new world order."

Cardinal Ratzinger proceeded to quote from Pope Benedict XV's 1920 encyclical Bonum sane: "The coming of a world state is longed for, by all the worst and most distorted elements. This state, based on the principles of absolute equality of men and a community of possessions, would banish all national loyalties. In it no acknowledgement would be made of the authority of a father over his children, or of God over human society. If these ideas are put into practice, there will inevitably follow a reign of unheard-of terror."

In a sermon in November, 2013, Pope Francis praised Lord of the World as depicting "the spirit of the world which leads to apostasy almost as if it were a prophecy."

In early 2015, Pope Francis further revealed Benson's influence upon his thinking, speaking to a plane load of reporters. At first apologising for making "a commercial", Pope Francis further praised Lord of the World, despite its being "a bit heavy at the beginning". Pope Francis elaborated, "It is a book that, at that time, the writer had seen this drama of ideological colonization and wrote that book... I advise you to read it. Reading it, you'll understand well what I mean by ideological colonization."

In March 2023, Pope Francis again mentioned that he "always recommends" Lord of the World during an interview with the Argentine newspaper La Nación. He referenced the book within the context of "ideological colonization" and in response to a question about non-binary gender options appearing on government forms, saying that such a phenomenon reminded him of the Benson's "futuristic" world, “in which differences are disappearing and everything is the same, everything is uniform, a single leader of the whole world.”

Before his papacy, Pope Leo XIV mentioned the book and said, "It has a number of interesting passages which give food for thought, in terms of the world we are living in."

=== Literature ===
The Sun Eater series by Christopher Ruocchio includes numerous references to a character from the series's long-distant past named Julian Felsenburgh. Similar to the antagonist with the same name in Lord of the World, the character in the Sun Eater series is an American politician who "took power promising [to] end injustice and bring about peace. [He] did, and the people cheered him." As a result, Felsenburgh expands his territorial reign to "almost all of Earth." His administration ultimately results in catastrophic harm to Earth and humanity.

== See also ==
- The Last Word (Greene short story)
