= Wayne June =

American voice actor

Wayne June (1954–2025) was an American voice actor. He was known for his performance of the narrator from the roguelike role-playing video game Darkest Dungeon (2016), which was widely acclaimed; he reprised the role for the game's sequel, Darkest Dungeon II (2023), and for the multiplayer online battle arena (MOBA) game Dota 2 (2013).

June's other voice credits include the TV series Liberty: Vigilance and the BBC New Creatives short The Siren Song. He also narrated audiobooks of the works of H. P. Lovecraft, which the director of Darkest Dungeon Chris Bourassa listened to prior to developing the game; Lovecraft's brand of horror would be a major inspiration for the series. June was originally asked to narrate the game's trailer only, before the developers recognised his narration as a necessary part of the game.

June died in January 2025 of unreported causes. After his death, the developers of the Darkest Dungeon series, Red Hook Studios, ruled out using an AI reproduction of his voice, despite June giving permission for them to do so.
