= Urban the Ninth =

Book by Bruce Marshall

- Author: Bruce Marshall
- Publisher: Constable
- Publication date: 1973
- Publication place: Scotland
- Media type: Print (hardback)
- Pages: 192
- ISBN: 0-09-458990-9
- Followed by: Marx the First

Urban the Ninth is a 1973 Novel by Scottish writer Bruce Marshall. It is the first novel of a three volume series. It was followed by Marx the First and concludes with Peter the Second.

== Plot summary ==
A Catholic comic thriller – In 1990, Urban the Ninth takes over the papacy after Pope Marx I (successor of Leo XIV and Pius XIII) dies in an air crash. Urban IX has to face the Third Secret of Fatima (which had not yet been revealed in 1973, when the book was written) and a mysterious woman: perhaps, Pope Marx's secret lover.

A major subplot concerns the efforts of a mother superior of a religious order to get the order's founder canonised.
