= C. C. Martindale =

English Jesuit priest and author (1879-1963)

The Reverend Cyril Martindale SJ
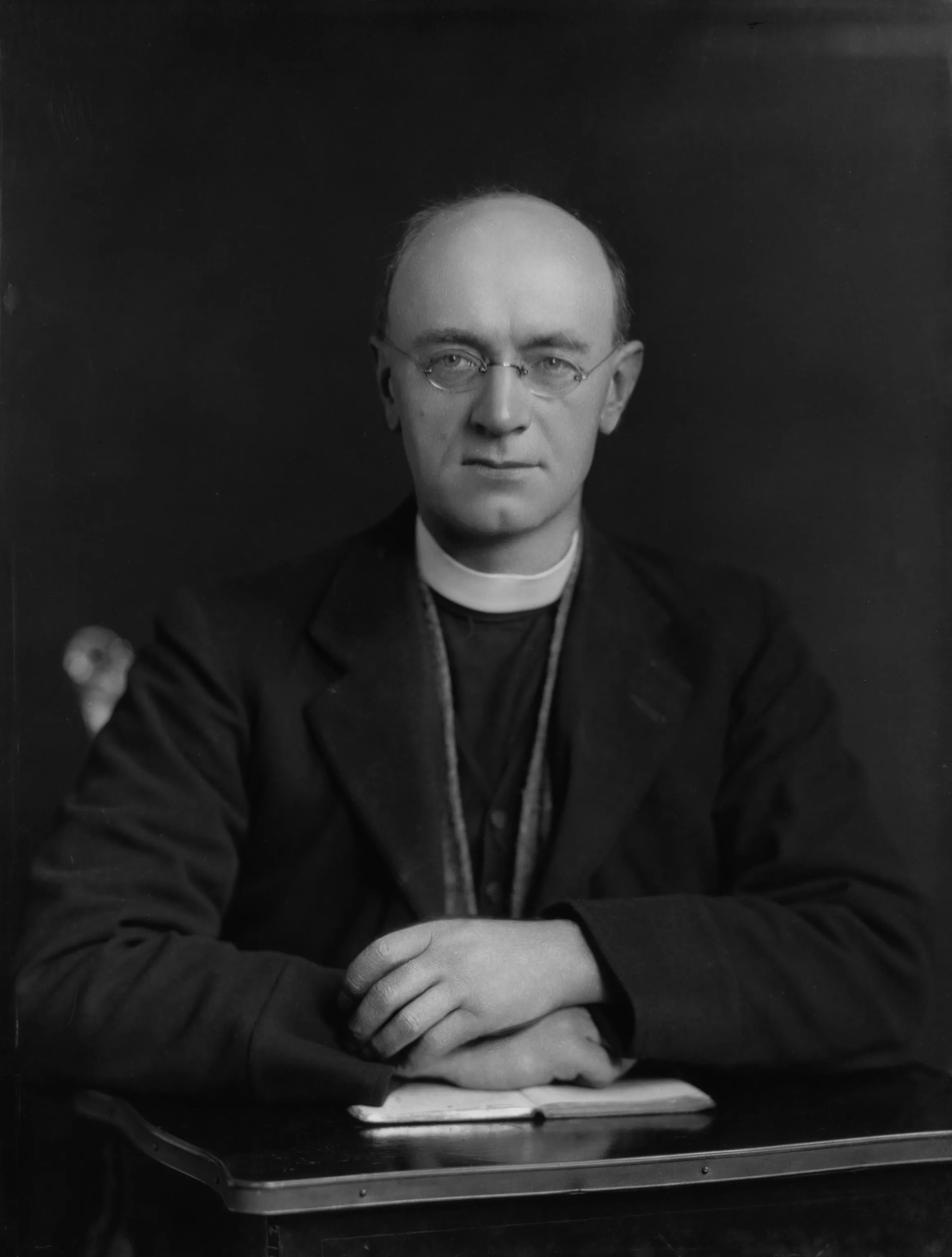
- Martindale in 1927
- Born: 25 May 1879; London, England
- Died: 18 March 1963 (aged 83); London, England
- Occupations: Priest (Roman Catholic, Jesuit)
- Writing career
- Period: 20th century
- Notable works: The Life of Monsignor Robert Hugh Benson (1916); In God's Nursery (1913); The Goddess of Ghosts (1915); Bernard Vaughan S.J. (1923); The Mind of the Missal (1929); The Vocation of Aloysius Gonzaga (1929); The Castle and the Ring (1950)

Cyril Charlie Martindale SJ (25 May 1879 – 18 March 1963) was a Roman Catholic priest, scholar, and writer. Along with Martin D'Arcy, he was one of England's foremost Catholics of the first half of the 20th century, and was a correspondent of figures including Graham Greene, Evelyn Waugh, and Ronald Knox.

== Background and education ==
Cyril Martindale was born on 25 May 1879 in Bayswater, London to Arthur Martindale and Marion McKenzie. As a boy at Harrow School, he converted to Roman Catholicism from the Church of England.

He entered the Society of Jesus on 7 September 1897, beginning his novitiate at Manresa House in Roehampton before transferring to Aix-en-Provence, France due to ill health (a recurring theme throughout his career). After his novitiate he began Philosophy studies at St Mary's Hall, Stonyhurst and later moved on to Pope's Hall (later Campion Hall) Oxford where he won multiple academic prizes, among them the Gaisford Prize with a translation of Virgil, Georgics, iv, 450-547 (Greek verse) in 1904 and in the same year the Chancellor's Prize with 'Sertorius in 1904 (Latin verse). He gained a First in Literae Humaniores in 1905.

== Career and legacy ==
After spending his regency teaching for three years at Stonyhurst and Roehampton, Martindale undertook his theological studies at St Beuno's but was moved at the end of his second year to Ore Place, Hastings (home of the exiled French Jesuits), being there ordained in 1911.

Following his ordination Martindale returned to Oxford University for a position in the sub-faculty of Literae Humaniores. According to Evelyn Waugh, he "dazzled and stimulated the most various undergraduates by his restless zeal, incisive diction, and by his modernity...[he] was loaded with academic distinctions, but he held aloof from High Tables." He was likewise notable for his contributions as a champion of the Faith in debates in the Oxford Union.

In 1926, he was appointed by the Jesuit Provincial to organise the English Province's celebrations for the bi-centenary of Saints Aloysius and Stanislaus' canonisations. In 1927, he departed Oxford to take a position at Farm Street Church, but continued a busy career of travel and writing. In 1928 he made a trip to Australia and New Zealand to participate in the International Eucharistic Congress at Sydney, in the course of which he was involved car accident thereafter suffering from persistent headaches throughout his life. During the inter-war period and after, he was a member of the committee supervising Ronald Knox's translation of the Bible from the Latin Vulgate. Martindale was in Denmark at the outbreak of the Second World War, and was held as a German detainee in Copenhagen until its end, during which he "had the happiness of receiving a certain number of people into the Church."

In the years following the Second World War, Martindale made two visits to Portugal, during which he conducted extensive research into the Miracle of Fátima, and published The Message of Fatima in 1950.

He died in London on 18 March 1963.

A collection of Martindale's papers is online via the Catholic Heritage website.

== Works ==
- The Goddess of Ghosts, Burns Oates & Washbourne Ltd., (1915).
- The Life Of Monsignor Robert Hugh Benson Vol I, Longmans, Green and Co., (1916).
- St. Justin the Martyr, Harding & More, Ltd., (1921).
- Princes of His People: St. John the Baptist, Burns Oates & Washbourne Ltd., (1922).
- Christ’s Cadets: St. Aloysius Gonzaga, St. Stanislaus Kostka, St. John Berchmans, Burns Oates & Washbourne Ltd., (1923).
- Princes of His People: St. Paul, Burns Oates & Washbourne Ltd., (1924).
- The Vocation of Aloysius Gonzaga, Sheed & Ward, (1927).
