= The Last Word (Greene short story) =

1988 short story by Graham Greene

First edition (publ. Reinhardt Books)

"The Last Word" is a dystopian short story by the author Graham Greene, written in 1988 (see 1988 in literature). It first appeared in The Independent but can also be found in collections of his short fiction, notably the Penguin edition of The Last Word and Other Stories, for which it is the lead story. The story, written toward the end of Greene's life, reflects his frustration at the declining influence of religion, particularly Catholicism, in the modern world.

"The Last Word" is Greene's final short story, before his death from leukaemia in 1991.

== Plot summary ==
The story revolves around the last Pope, John XXIX, who was overthrown more than twenty years earlier with the establishment of a new world government under General Megrim. The pope is now a frail old man, who lives in obscurity under a moderate form of house arrest, ignored by his neighbours and forbidden to keep any religious items. All he has left is a book, possibly a Bible, that he has managed to hide, and a crucifix with an arm broken off. He is already feeble-minded and has forgotten most of his past, and the world has forgotten him as well—when the concierge at a hotel is told that he is the pope, he answers, "The Pope? What's the Pope?"

When the Pope was toppled, there was an attempt to assassinate him, but this failed, and it was afterwards decided not to make him a martyr to the few surviving Christians. Since then, Christianity has been eradicated, and the Pope is now the last surviving Christian.

In the story, the Pope is flown for a formal meeting with the General, the new leader of the new world order. After many long years, it is a formal meeting, much publicized in the world press. The Pope's robes and even his papal ring are restored to him from the World Museum of Myths, and he is forced to don them for the occasion, faintly remembering earlier days when they were his normal attire. At 11:30 am sharp, he is taken to meet the general, who reminds him that he is "The last Pope, but still a Pope," and therefore still a threat. The general places a gun on the table and offers him an opportunity to die with dignity, "The last Christian. This is a moment of history." After many long years of isolation, this is a relief to the Pope. The two men share a glass of wine before the execution is to take place. His last words, before he is shot, are Corpus Domini nostri...

Greene ends the story by reflecting on the General's concern that Christianity may be abandoned and its last believers persecuted, but that somehow the faith will survive. Even after performing the execution himself, the General is plagued by the doubt, "...is it possible that what this man believed may be true?"

== See also ==
- Lord of the World
