= Marx the First =

1973 novel by Bruce Marshall

- First edition
- Author: Bruce Marshall
- Cover artist: Gérard Lecoeur
- Publisher: Constable
- Publication date: 1975
- Publication place: Scotland
- Media type: Print (hardback)
- Pages: 181
- ISBN: 0-09-460640-4
- Preceded by: Urban the Ninth
- Followed by: Peter the Second

Marx the First is a 1973 novel by Scottish writer Bruce Marshall. It is the second novel of a three volume series. Urban the Ninth is the first and Peter the Second the final.

== Plot summary ==
In this Catholic comic thriller Pope Marx the First returns to the Vatican after being thought lost in an air crash two years previous. He takes over from Cardinal Stephen, who had been elected as Urban IX, an "accidental Pope" during the time Marx was thought lost.

Pope Marx, a very liberal Catholic, plans to make many radical changes to Catholic teaching, practices and doctrines. Stephen, who opposes these planned changes, is now serving as the Vatican's Secretary of State so that the Pope "can keep his eye on him."

The mother superior of a religious order is attempting to get the order's founder canonised. A number of miraculous occurrences happen and some say these events are due to the founder's intercession while others contest this. This leads to diplomatic friction between the USSR, Spain, The United Kingdom and the Vatican.
