= Darkest Dungeon =

2016 video game

- Developer: Red Hook Studios
- Publisher: Red Hook Studios (Note: Physical versions published by Merge Games)
- Director: Chris Bourassa
- Producer: Tyler Sigman
- Designer: Tyler Sigman
- Programmers: Keir Miron; Pierre Tardif; Kelvin McDowell
- Artists: Chris Bourassa; Brooks Gordon
- Composer: Stuart Chatwood
- Platforms: Microsoft Windows; OS X; Linux; PlayStation 4; PlayStation Vita; iOS; Nintendo Switch; Xbox One
- Release: January 19, 2016: Windows, OS X; January 19, 2016; Linux; April 26, 2016; PlayStation 4, PS Vita; September 27, 2016; iPadOS; August 24, 2017; Nintendo Switch; January 18, 2018; Xbox One; February 28, 2018
- Genres: Role-playing, roguelike
- Mode: Single-player

Darkest Dungeon is a roguelike role-playing video game developed and published by Red Hook Studios. The game was first released for Microsoft Windows and OS X in January 2016, which followed a year-long early access development period. Later that year, it was released for PlayStation 4, PlayStation Vita, and Linux, with a port for iOS being released in 2017, and ports for Nintendo Switch and Xbox One being released by 2018.

Darkest Dungeon has the player manage a roster of heroes to explore dungeons below a gothic mansion the player has inherited. Played out in a mix of real-time movement and turn-based combat, a core feature of Darkest Dungeon is the stress level of each hero that increases with further exploration and combat; a character sustaining a high-stress level may gain afflictions that will hamper, or possibly enhance, their performance as an explorer. The Stress Symbol, or Iron Crown, a crescent with five inward-facing spikes, is also in the game's logo.

The game received positive reviews from critics, garnering several award nominations, and went on to sell over two million copies. A sequel, Darkest Dungeon II, was released in May 2023 and a board game adaptation is also in development.

== Gameplay ==
In-game screenshot of a typical battle scene. The character in the foreground is performing her combat animation against the enemy party on the right.

Darkest Dungeon is a roguelike role-playing game in which the player manages a roster of heroes and adventurers to explore these dungeons and fight the creatures within. Prior to entering a dungeon, the player can use facilities in the Hamlet, the game's "hub-town" near the mansion to manage a roster of heroes and inventory. The facilities can be used to cure heroes and reduce their stress, recruit new heroes, upgrade character stats, and buy new items. Each hero belongs to one of twenty character classes, and has their own statistics and skills that can be upgraded over time. If a hero dies while exploring a dungeon, that hero is lost for good.

Once the player has completed preparations, they select four of their heroes to go explore a procedurally-generated dungeon. Combat encounters play out in a turn-based manner. A core element of Darkest Dungeon is its Affliction system, which indicates heroes' stress levels or resolves. A number of factors impact Affliction while in a dungeon, such as adventuring without food or light sources, witnessing the death or wounding of a fellow party member in battle, or from blights cast on them by enemies. Unchecked stress levels will gradually interfere with the behavior of the character, such as being frightened and unable to fight directly or acting without or against the player's direction. Allowing a hero to reach an extremely high stress level can cause them to have a heart attack, bringing them to the brink of death if not immediately tended to. Stress can be lowered while in a dungeon through camping offered at specific locations, or other restorative items, as well as when back in the nearby town.

In-game screenshot of a battle scene with the new DLC encounter boss The Fanatic

=== Downloadable content ===
The downloadable content (DLC) package "The Crimson Court" was released on June 19, 2017, for PC and August 22, 2017, for PlayStation 4, introducing a Courtyard environment, a new playable class, a faction with new enemies, five new boss encounters, as well as new trinkets and Hamlet upgrade buildings. Also of note is that a hero can be turned into a vampire via the Crimson Curse, a new status effect introduced in the DLC.

The next DLC, "The Color of Madness", was released on June 19, 2018. Narratively, it has a meteor crash near the village that causes some of the villagers to turn into zombie-like creatures. This leads to new dungeons, monsters, and other aspects of gameplay. This also adds a new mode, a horde mode, where the player's party must survive as many encounters as they can against these new creatures.

The next DLC, "The Butcher's Circus", was released in May 2020. The expansion added a new area and includes a player versus player mode that allows players to assemble a team of four adventurers to challenge another player's in an arena-type combat game.

In addition to the larger DLC packs, two playable character classes, the Musketeer and the Shieldbreaker, were also released as DLC, although the Musketeer is functionally identical to the Arbalest, a base game class.

On July 21st, 2026, "The Fire's Edge" DLC was announced to release on August 18. It added two new classes, new mechanics, trinkets and Hamlet districts.

== Plot ==
At the outset of Darkest Dungeon, the player learns that they have inherited an estate from an Ancestor who, while seeking to fulfill his ambiguous ambitions by excavating the dungeons and catacombs beneath his manor, has unearthed some terrible monstrosity and released a number of horrific and evil creatures and corruptions onto the world. Now as the owner of the estate and the surrounding lands, the player must recruit a roster of adventurers and mount expeditions to cleanse the estate of its vile inhabitants.

As the player ventures into the manor, the dungeons below it and the surrounding lands, they find their Ancestor's memoirs telling of the terrible deeds he had done in pursuit of knowledge and power, as well as personal desire. Eventually, the player is able to enter the Darkest Dungeon itself, the source of the land's corruption, taking steps to reveal its ultimate form. Within the deepest chamber, the player encounters the disembodied spirit of their Ancestor, who now remains as "an Avatar of the Crawling Chaos". After defeating the Ancestor's apparition, the party battles the Heart of Darkness - which the Ancestor reveals to be the heart of the planet itself. The party manages to defeat its physical form at great cost, but the Ancestor's spirit reveals to the player that this has only delayed its inevitable awakening and, by extension, the end of the world. The Ancestor claims that this is merely part of an endless cycle in the player's lineage and that the player will eventually meet the same fate as he, and their descendants onward. The Ancestor then accentuates this cycle by repeating his first words from the start of the game: "Ruin has come to our family."

== Development ==
Director Chris Bourassa and lead designer Tyler Sigman had become friends while working at Backbone Entertainment, and had talked about the idea of building a game together, but their commitments to other studios left them unable to do so. During 2012 and early 2013, they had brainstormed a number of ideas for potential games to develop. In April 2013, they found they had the time to work on this project, and decided it was a "now or never" moment, forming British Columbia-based Red Hook Studios to develop the game. By 2015, their team included six people in addition to three more supporting their sound, music, and narration for the game.

The main gameplay of Darkest Dungeon started out as a tile-based game that had the player control a group of characters as they moved about in a dungeon, eventually transitioning into a combat mode when they had encounters. The two recognized that players would get bored of looking at icons of the characters' heads all the time via the top-down icons, which would not allow players to come to bond with the characters. This led to the concept of presenting characters from the side view in combat, making the player feel they were at the same level as the characters, alleviating some of these issues. This gave Bourassa, the principal artist on the game, an opportunity to show off more of his work. However, this would have left them the need to transition from top-down to side-view and create more art assets. They worked around this by using the same side-view not only for combat but for dungeon exploration, creating the basic gameplay of Darkest Dungeon.

The side-view mechanic then led into the idea of the characters being in ranks, allowing for certain attacks, abilities, or defenses if they were in the right rank; characters in the front could have powerful melee attacks but take more damage, while characters in the back would be more protected but limited to weaker ranged attacks. This was an idea inspired by The Bard's Tale, but they were able to expand upon it to create interesting situations, such as having characters pulled out of rank by an enemy attack. This in turn led to a new attribute for how likely a character could be moved out of position, creating strategies for the player as to handle a mix-up in the ranks during combat, as well as applying the same principles of rank to the enemy forces and making situations for the player to figure out how to take advantage of a weak rank arrangement. Furthering from these concepts, they crafted the character classes to have various strengths and weaknesses based on their rank positioning, creating further strategic elements for the player to explore.

One core idea of the game was its Affliction system, in which the dungeon-crawling characters would gain stress and eventually afflictions as they explored. Bourassa and Sigman noted that while they are fans of classic role-playing games such as The Bard's Tale, Eye of the Beholder, and Ultima Underworld, most of these games lacked the human element to the characters. They give an example of a character being down to their last hit point in battle and the player simply making decisions to win, the character reacting regardless of their low health. They instead wanted to "toy with player agency", giving moments where the player is reminded they do not have full control of the actions of the adventurers in the party. They also sought to alter how most loot systems in role-playing games work so that the player was not always focused on finding the best gear for the characters but instead working to support their characters. Bourassa and Sigman were aware that these facets may turn players away from the game due to the difficulty and inability to have full control, but continued to stay true to their vision of the game.

=== Influences ===
The Affliction system was inspired by psychologically traumatized heroes, both through historical events as well as works of fiction such as Hudson from Aliens and the soldiers from Band of Brothers who are transformed by the horrors of combat; Sigman pointed to the seventh episode of Band of Brothers where a soldier watches his friends die from a shell explosion, stares transfixed at the event, and then becomes unable to fight any more, as the feeling they wanted to capture. Though they were also inspired by Lovecraftian horror, they did not want to use the concept of "insanity" that is common in that genre, and instead focused more on the nature of stress and how it affected the human psyche. Because of the importance of the Affliction system to Darkest Dungeon, the developers spent significant time to make sure that the impact of stress and afflictions were emphasized dramatically in the game's presentation, using special graphics and sound cues to signal the onset of an affliction. They also created a "bark system", dialog stated by a character reflecting their current stress, affliction, and other attributes as another means to humanize the characters and remind the player that they do not have full control of the characters. Alongside the Affliction system, they developed the town facilities that are used to cure afflictions and reduce stress, using concepts they borrowed from tabletop games. They also included Virtues, positive afflictions that can result from high stress situations, and a means of tracking the afflictions of a given character over time, so that in future stress situations the character will often become encumbered by the same affliction, developing a behavioral pattern that the player may be able to use to their benefit.

A disembodied narrator, voiced by Wayne June, was also included to comment in a sardonic manner throughout the game, furthering the atmosphere they wanted. Bourassa had listened to June's readings of various H.P. Lovecraft works prior to developing the game, which partially inspired Darkest Dungeon. When the two were preparing the game's first teaser trailer, they felt they needed a narrator and approached June for his work. Once the trailer was completed, they recognized that June's voice as narrator was a necessary element for the game. Art assets were created by Bourassa; in addition to the Lovecraftian nature, he wanted to give the game the look of woodcut and illuminated manuscripts, and took inspiration from artists such as Albrecht Dürer and eastern European painters. He further modernized the look by using ideas from comic book artists including Mike Mignola, Guy Davis, Chris Bachalo, and Viktor Kalvachev. The game uses a homebrewed, lightweight cross-platform game engine developed by programmer Kelvin McDowell.

=== Release ===
Bourassa and Sigman used their personal savings to fund the creation of Red Hook Studios, and sought to gain a grant from the Canada Media Fund, but were rejected. Having originally anticipated an eighteen-month development period, they sought a way to fund the extended development period. They launched a Kickstarter campaign in February 2014 for funding; prior to starting the Kickstarter, they made sure they had prepared enough of a media interest, including a trailer for the game released in October 2013, to attract attention at the onset of the campaign. Due to the early marketing, the funding goal of $75,000 was reached within the first two days of the campaign, and completed with over $313,000 of funding from close to 10,000 backers.

Darkest Dungeon was first released in Steam's early access program on February 3, 2015. They used feedback from the Early Access period, particularly through those that streamed their playthrough of the game, to help with playtesting and adjust the balance of the game, while also finding that their approach to gameplay and presentation was validated by positive reception from these streamers. The first major content patch, Fiends and Frenzy, added the Arbalest and Man at Arms classes. Sigman noted that developing in Early Access was comparable to "working while naked in a transparent cube suspended above Times Square", but felt their transparency with players made the final product much better. Bourassa and Sigman noted that they had had some issues with user feedback during Early Access, specifically after they added two gameplay elements around July 2015: the addition of corpses which affected combat positioning issues, and the possibility of a stressed character suffering a heart attack and dying immediately. Some Early Access players were dissatisfied with these changes, feeling it put the player at far too much disadvantage to an already difficult game, and complained to the studio. Bourassa and Sigman had debated what to do with these two features and eventually opted to make them optional elements to the gameplay. Though this change was generally met with approval, a number of these players remained bitter about the game throughout the rest of its development, and attempted to have the studio's and the game's reputation derided by James Stephanie Sterling, who has frequently been critical of Steam and Early Access titles; Sterling instead found the game to be enjoyable even with this change. Bourassa and Sigman recognized they could have done a better job in the social media to placate the complaints early on, but still felt they chose the right path with retaining these features and sticking to their vision instead of trying to meet all expectations from Early Access players.

Though Red Hook anticipated releasing the game in October 2015, a personal loss affected one of the team members, and the game was subsequently released on January 19, 2016, for personal computers. A cross-buy version for the PlayStation 4 and PlayStation Vita was originally planned for release in the second quarter of 2016, but was pushed back to Q3 2016 to improve playability with the Sony controllers as well as to prepare these versions to align with new features to be introduced in the personal computer versions prior to this release. This version was released on September 27, 2016.

The game's first major update in May 2016 following its full release, "Everything Burns", which among bug fixes and other small improvements, adds in Town Events, whereupon return to the town the player may encounter a random reward, such as an extra recruit to join their party or the temporary closure of one of the town facilities. Following on the previous issues with Early Access updates, some of these features can be eliminated or their frequency reduced in the game's options menu.

The game's first downloadable content, "The Crimson Court", was released on June 19, 2017, on personal computers with the PlayStation 4 version to come later. The new content added a new hero class, a new dungeon type, new enemies and bosses, and other similar content to the game. Integration with Steam Workshop was added in an April 2017 update. Red Hook plans to develop additional downloadable content, to develop for other platforms, specifically highlight touch-based devices as they found their interface is already well-suited to this input mode.

A version for iPad was released on August 24, 2017. This version allows players to transfer save files from the personal computer editions to use with the iPad version. A version for the Nintendo Switch was released on January 18, 2018, via Nintendo eShop, alongside availability of "The Crimson Court" and "The Shieldbreaker" DLC. An Xbox One version released on February 28, 2018; it will initially be released as Darkest Dungeon: Crimson Edition which will include the "Crimson Court" content at a discount; after two months, that version will be replaced with the base game with additional DLC, including "Crimson Court", that can be purchased, as well as an Ancestral Edition that includes all DLC.

In 2018, publisher Merge Games released a retail version of the game for both the PlayStation 4 and Nintendo Switch, subtitled as Ancestral Edition. Another DLC, The Color of Madness, was released for the PC versions of the game on June 19, 2018. A free DLC expansion, Butcher's Circus, which adds a player versus player mode, was released on May 28, 2020.

== Reception ==
Reception

Aggregate score
Aggregator	Score
Metacritic	PC: 84/100; PS4: 83/100 iOS: 80/100; NS: 85/100

Review scores
Publication	Score
Destructoid	8/10
Game Informer	9.25/10
Hardcore Gamer	4/5
IGN	9.1/10
PC Gamer (US)	88/100
TouchArcade	iOS: 5/5

The game received generally positive reviews on its full release in 2016, holding a score of 84 out of 100 on Metacritic. The Escapist awarded it a score of 4 out of 5, saying "Darkest Dungeon will kill your party, drive you insane, and leave you a gibbering mess at the Sanitarium. Yet it's so compelling and rewarding at the same time, you won't be able to resist diving back in for one more quest." IGN awarded it 9.1 out of 10, saying "Darkest Dungeon is a punishing and awesome game of tactics, management, and pushing your luck to the breaking point." PC Gamer awarded it 88%, saying "A wonderfully executed, brilliantly stressful reinvention of party-based dungeon-crawling, Darkest Dungeon is great fun, even when it's cruel." GameSpot awarded it a score of 9 out of 10, saying "Darkest Dungeon plays the long game. It builds you up for a grand bout that will test everything you've learned, as well as your ability to plan several in-game weeks out."

Red Hook Studios reported that a week after the game's 2016 release, over 650,000 copies of Darkest Dungeon had been sold, including those from Kickstarter backers and Early Access purchases. In November 2016, about a month after the release of the PlayStation versions, Red Hook announced the game had sold more than one million copies across all platforms. By December 2017, all versions combined had worldwide sales of 2 million copies.

Darkest Dungeon was nominated for three 2016 Independent Games Festival awards: the Seumas McNally Grand Prize, Excellence in Visual Art and Excellence in Audio. It was nominated for the Most Fulfilling Community-Funded Game for the 2017 SXSW Gaming Awards. At the 2017 National Academy of Video Game Trade Reviewers Awards the game won the award for "Game, Original Role Playing", whereas it was nominated for "Performance in a Drama, Supporting" for Wayne June as the narrator. At the same NAVGTR Awards the following year, The Crimson Court DLC was nominated for "Game, Franchise Role Playing" and "Performance in a Drama, Supporting" for June.

== Competitive scene ==
The release of The Butcher's Circus DLC gave rise to a small but active competitive community, with regular tournaments organized by players. Among its most prominent competitors are Scylaac, who ranked at the top of the competitive scene during the 2023, 2024, and 2025 seasons, and Sheperd Doggy, a leading tournament organizer and community figure.

== Sequel ==
Red Hook announced Darkest Dungeon II in February 2019. The sequel was released for Microsoft Windows in May 2023, after a year and a half in early access.
