= Xynoris =

Fictional saint created through mistranslation

Saint Xynoris is a fictional Christian saint who was created through a mistranslation. The saint was inadvertently fabricated by Caesar Baronius when he mistranslated the notes of John Chrysostom while chronicling the oppression of Christians under Roman Emperor Julian.

== Mistranslation and creation ==
In his writings on the martyrdom of Saint Juventinus and Saint Maximinus, Cardinal Caesar Baronius described a "couple" of martyrs in Antioch, which he derived from the works of Saint Chrysostom, who used the Greek word Ζεύγος (couple or pair) to describe the two. This word (which is in fact an apellative noun) was incorrectly translated by Baronius into the name new name Xynoris, leading the Cardinal to declare that a female Christian had been martyred in Antioch alongside the two men. 25 January was the feast date assigned to the saint.

Baronius' error was later discovered and corrected, but the mistake was recorded as an example of mistranslation in books such as Henry B. Wheatley's History of Human Error.
