= Church of the Immaculate Heart of Mary, Paris =

- Église du Cœur-Immaculé-de-Marie de Paris
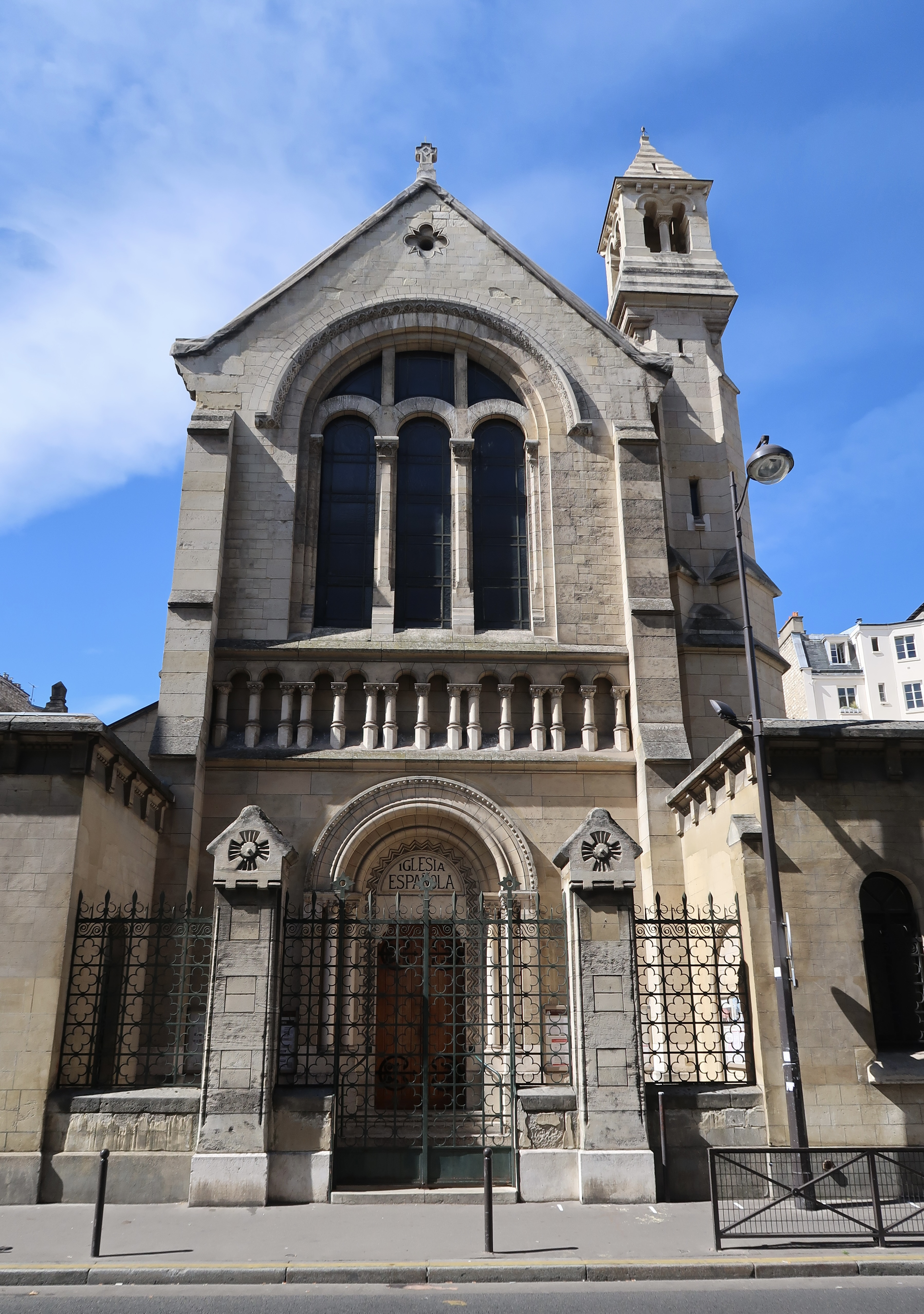
- Church of the Immaculate Heart of Mary, Paris
- 48°51′44″N 2°16′32″E
- Location: 51-53 rue de la Pompe, 16th arr.
- Country: France
- Denomination: Roman Catholic

History
- Status: since 1914, Mission for Spanish community
- Founded: 1898

Architecture
- Functional status: Active
- Style: Neo-Gothic
- Completed: 1898

Administration
- Archdiocese: Paris

The Church of the Immaculate Heart of Mary, Paris is a Roman Catholic Church located at 51-53 rue de la Pompe in the 16th arrondissement of Paris. Since 1921, it has been the church of the Mission of the Spanish Catholic Church in Paris. Its nearest Metro station is Rue de la Pompe on the number 9 line.

== History ==
The church was built in 1898 to be the chapel of the religious order of the Carmelites, but the Carmelites, after a dispute with the French government, were expelled from France in 1901. In 1914, it became a church for Spanish immigrants arriving in Paris. The first Mass in Spanish was held on 15 October, 1914, dedicated to Saint Theresa of Avila. In 1921, the church became the property of the Spanish government.

The church grew rapidly along with the Spanish community in Paris. It registered forty-one baptisms in 1916, and 692 in 1968. During the German occupation during the Section World War, the church furnished 155 false baptismal certificates to Parisian Jews, saving them from the Nazi concentration camps. The church also offers additional courses in Spanish for students in French schools.

== Architecture ==
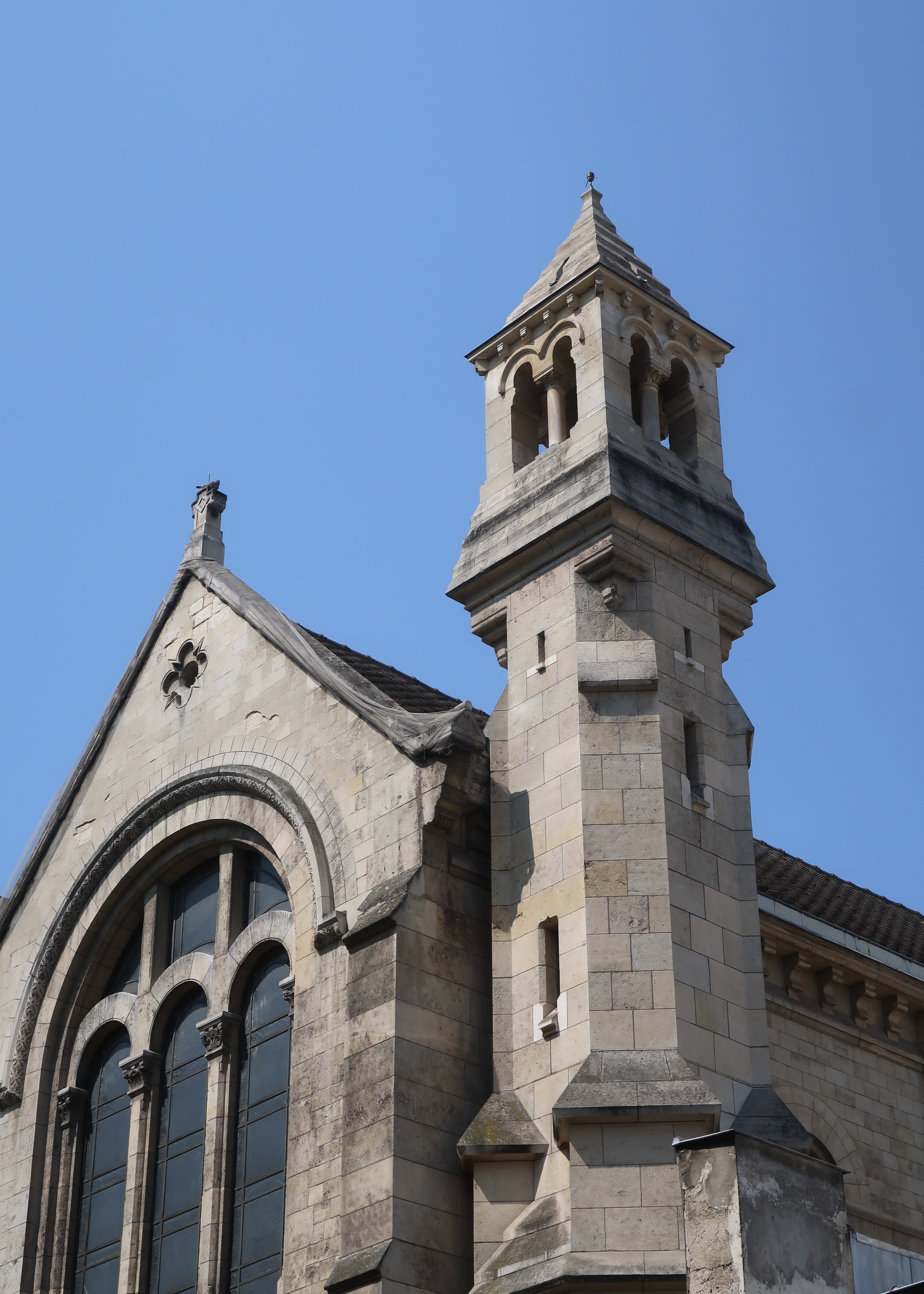
The bell tower

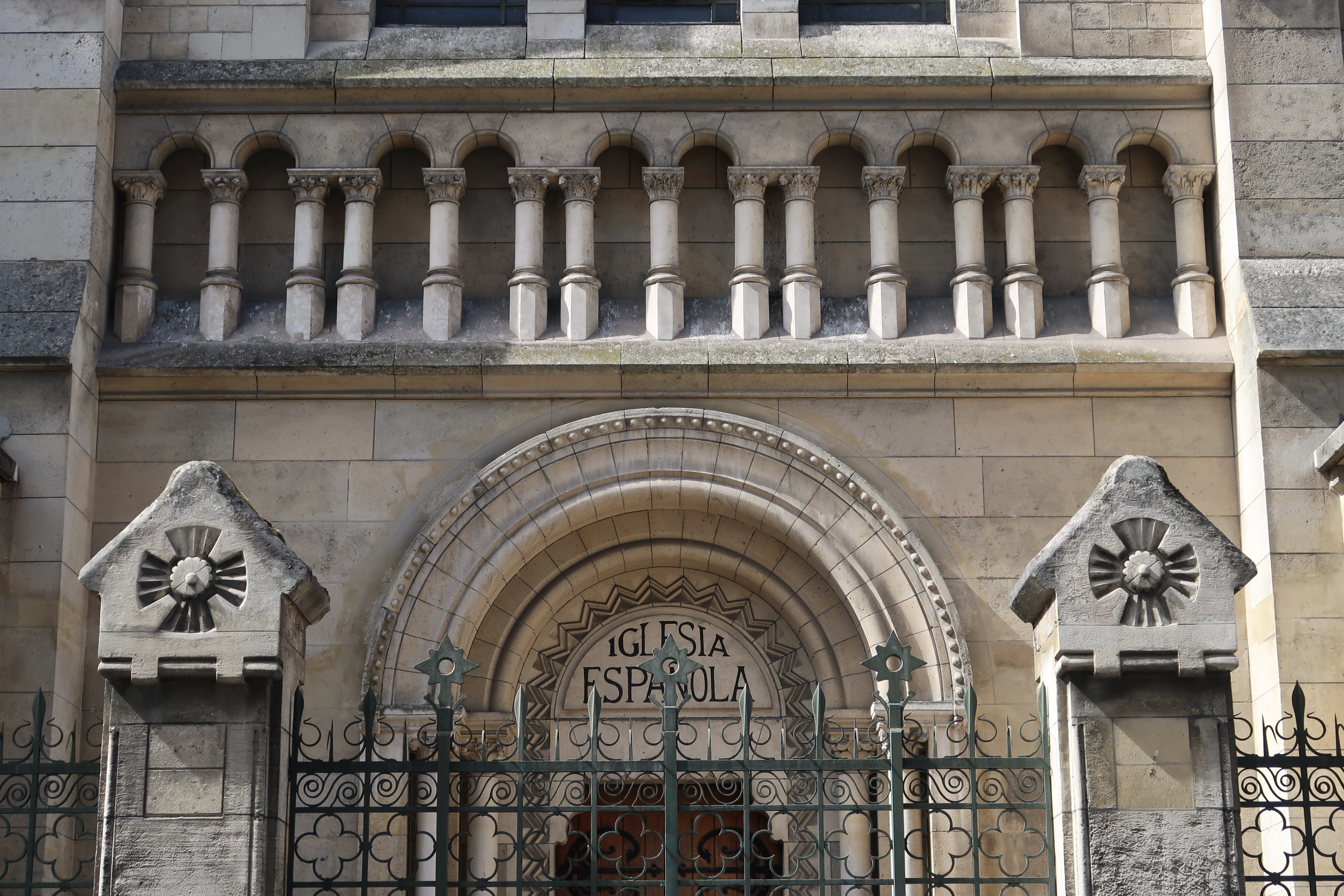
Portal

The facade of the church expresses the style of Neo-Gothic Architecture, in the form of a Latin cross, with a transept crossing the nave. The interior has two levels; large windows on the top level bring in abundant light. while the nave is separated from the outer aisles by tall columns reaching up to the ceiling vaults, and double rounded arches. Additional color is given to the nave and transept by murals at the middle level illustrating the themes of the New testament and glorifying the European Christian Saints.

== Interior ==
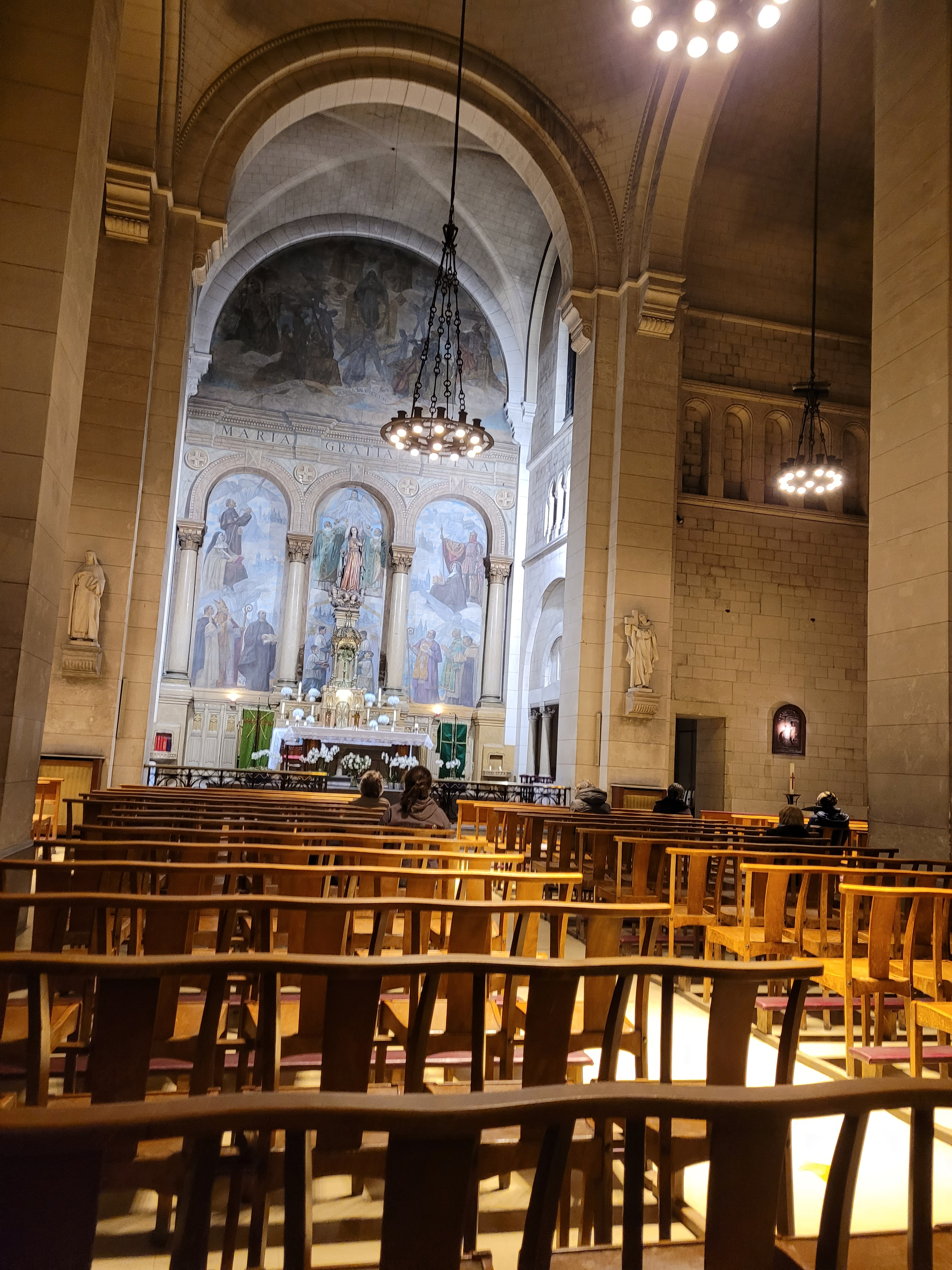
The choir viewed from the nave

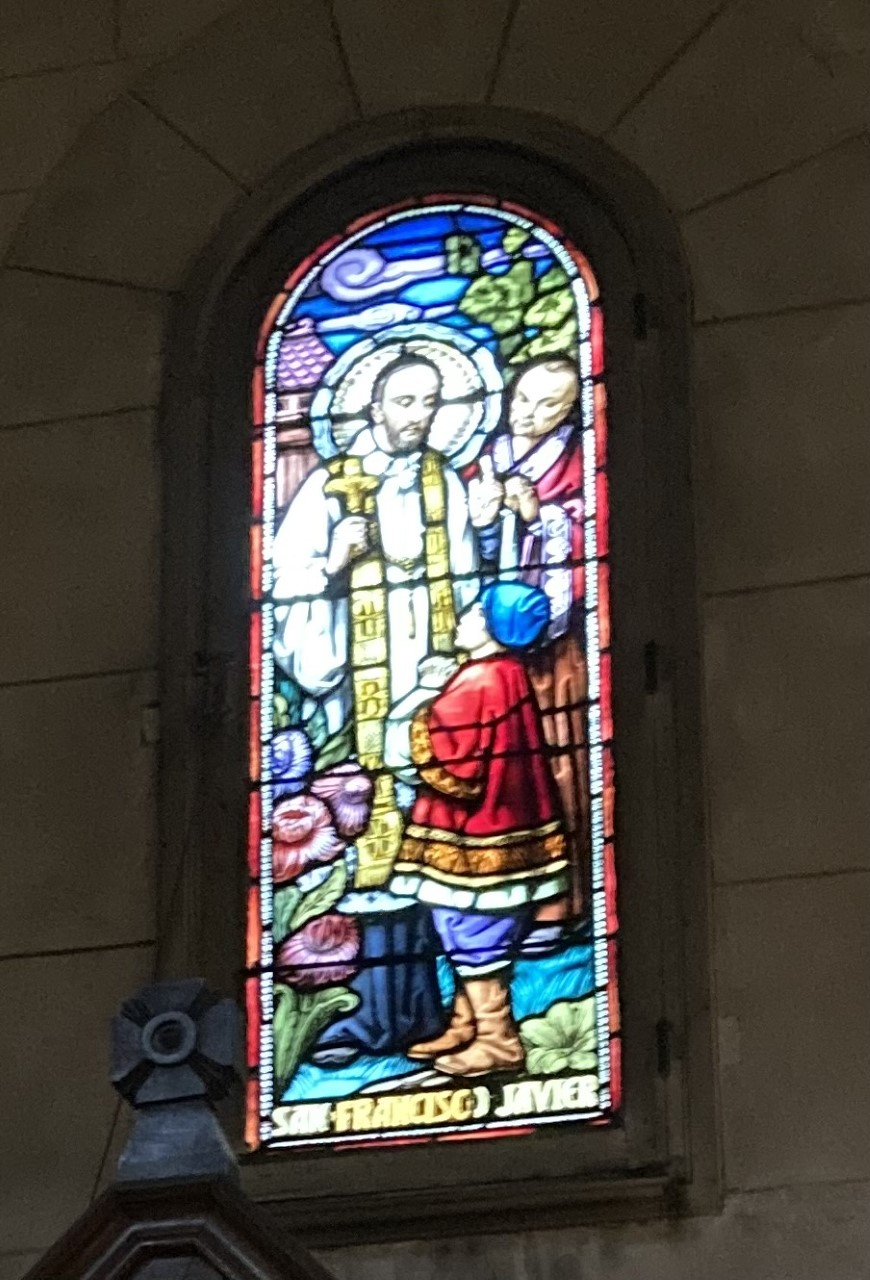
Stained glass window depicting Saint Francis Xavier

The choir is decorated on the upper level by a large mural illustrating the Virgin Mary in her Glory surrounded by Spanish Christian saints and monks. The central place of the choir is occupied by a lifelike statue of the Virgin Mary, with clothing in color, in the Spanish style. A chapel altar in the transept presents a statue of Saint Francis Xavier, also in color, surrounded by angels.
