= The Vengeance of Nitocris =

Short story by Tennessee Williams

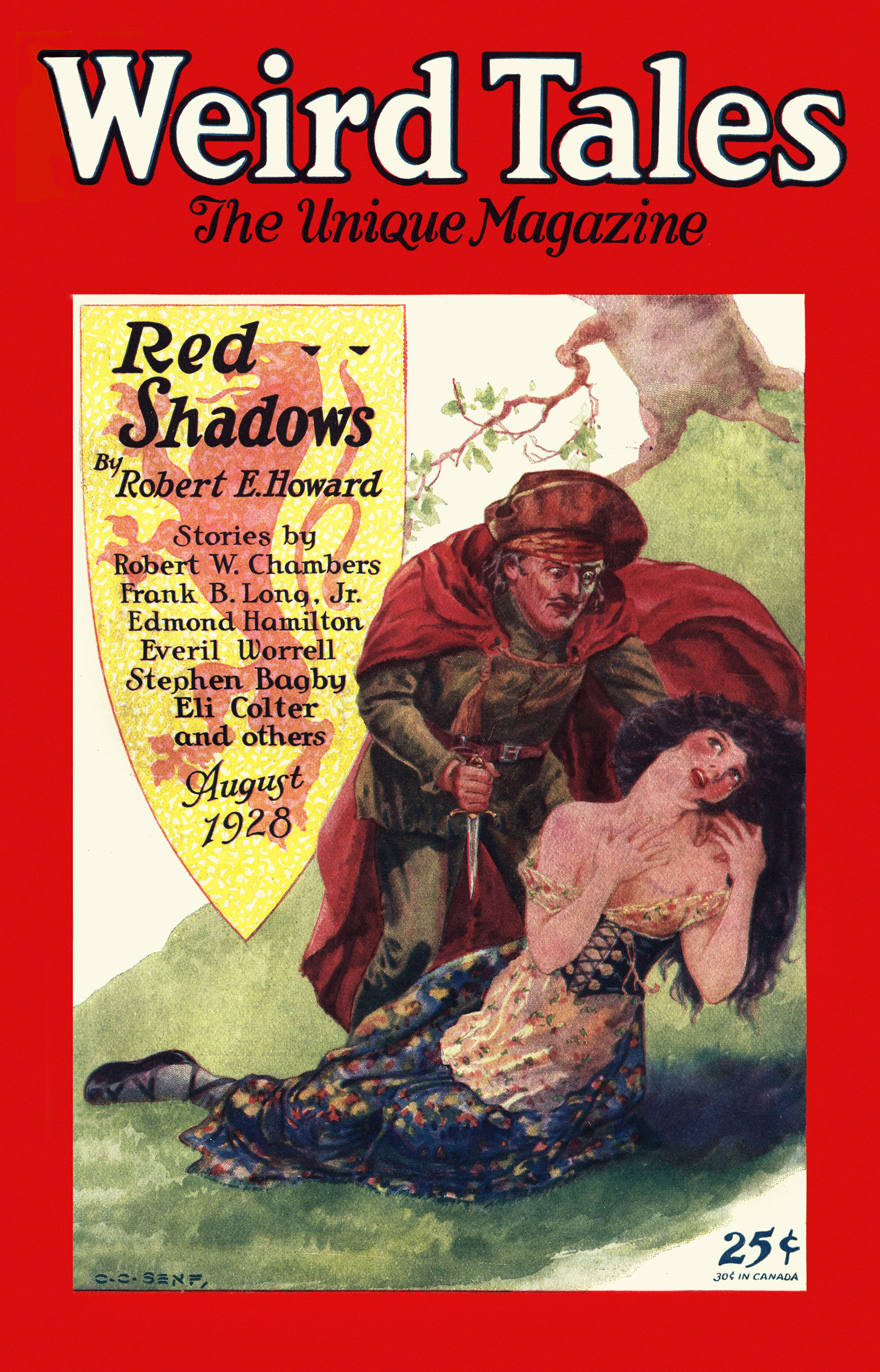
The August, 1928 issue of Weird Tales, where "The Vengeance of Nitocris" was first published.

"The Vengeance of Nitocris" is a short story by Tennessee Williams, written when Williams was 16 years old. It was published in Weird Tales in its August, 1928 issue, under the byline "Thomas Lanier Williams", the writer's actual given name. The story is a "surprisingly lurid" tale of loosely historical fiction, based on the account of the semi-legendary female pharaoh Nitocris found in Herodotus. Williams was paid $35 (equivalent to $656 in 2025) for the story by Weird Tales; it was his first piece of stand-alone published fiction. Robert E. Howard's "Red Shadows", the story that introduced Solomon Kane, was the cover story.

== Plot ==
Nitocris is the sister of an unnamed pharaoh. When a bridge the pharaoh built across the Nile collapses, the pharaoh extinguishes the sacred fires of Osiris, defiles a temple with hyena sacrifices, and as a result dies at the hands of an angry mob of priests and citizens. Nitocris, now the empress, takes revenge for the execution of her brother for sacrilege by inviting his judges to a banquet in a magnificent temple she has constructed, feigning only a desire to atone for his offenses. In fact, the new temple is an elaborate death trap. Once they have gathered, she opens a sluice gate and allows the water of the Nile to drown them all, and takes a great deal of pleasure in their demise. Then, realizing that she cannot escape retribution, she has her "boudoir" filled with hot ashes and commits suicide by asphyxiation.

== Themes ==
Williams remarked about the story in a New York Times interview, that " I was sixteen when I wrote ["The Vengeance of Nitocris"], but already a confirmed writer, having entered upon this vocation at the age of fourteen, and, if you're well acquainted with my writings since then, I don't have to tell you that it set the keynote for most of the work that has followed." Despite the story's somewhat florid prose ("Hushed were the streets of many peopled Thebes. Those few who passed through them moved with the shadowy fleetness of bats near dawn, and bent their faces from the sky as if fearful of seeing what in their fancies might be hovering there..."), the story prefigures themes found in Williams's later plays. The tale features a strong female protagonist, possibly affected by madness; and a brother-sister relationship is central to its plot. A psychic bond of reciprocity between brother and sister, in that Nitocris expresses the belief that "even he must have considered his avenging adequate", is a theme that appears in several of Williams's later works, including The Two Character Play, Out Cry, and to some extent even The Glass Menagerie.

The story also reflects Williams's longstanding interest in Shakespeare; Williams noted that when he was ten years old, he had been "interested in blood and guts Shakespeare", and that his favorite Shakespeare play was Titus Andronicus, the revenge tragedy. Williams's Nitocris has been called the first of a long series of Cleopatra figures appearing in his works, the result of his early reading of Shakespeare's Antony and Cleopatra; these figures go on to include Blanche DuBois.
