= Marcia Haufrecht =

American dramatist

- Born: Marcia Haufreucht; New York City, U.S.
- Other name: Marcia Howard (stage name from 1955 through 1963)
- Occupations: Actor, acting teacher, playwright, director
- Years active: 1954–present

Marcia Haufrecht is an American actress, playwright and director, as well as a noted acting teacher and coach. A life member of Actors Studio, and a longtime member of The Ensemble Studio Theatre, she is also the founder and artistic director of the Off-Off-Broadway company (and venue), The Common Basis Theatre (originally The Common Ground Theatre).

== Early life ==
Haufrecht was the first of three children born to Herbert and Judith Haufreucht, (Note: Judging from Google News Archive searches for each spelling, the Haufreucht family as a whole seems to have dropped the second 'u' as of the mid-1940s. The latest article featuring the original spelling occurs in 1946.) the former a noted pianist, composer, folklorist and editor.

== Career ==
=== Dance ===
Haufrecht said that Broadway was scarcely clamoring for "a barefoot, modern dancer", much less for one of Haufrecht's diminutive stature and limited experience. She made her Off-Broadway debut as an actress that September at the Cherry Lane Theatre, with a small part in the Studio 12 (Note: Formerly Theatre 12, and prior to that, the 12th Street Players, Studio 12's chief components, director Denis Vaughan and set designer Bert Greene, would go on to greater fame as cookbook authors and owners of an upscale Amagansett eatery catering to a celebrity clientele.) limited-run revival of Jean-Paul Sartre's The Flies. Her Broadway and her professional dancing debuts occurred two months later, when she was signed for the musical, Plain and Fancy. The show's choreographer, Helen Tamiris (a former colleague of Haufrecht's father) was instrumental in being included in the show. The show's producers changed Haufrecht's professional name to Howard, and so she remained for at least six years.

In the summer of 1955, Haufrecht toured nationally with Can-Can, a part that she attributed to fortuitous timing:

I think the only reason they hired me was because it was in the dead of summer, and the only people that showed up to the audition were strippers; they weren't really dancers. So they had to hire me; I was the only dancer that showed up.

Before she was 20, Haufrecht turned her attention to acting, as she told The Montreal Gazette in 1969, "because I hated being part of the background. I felt so superfluous. And I felt I had something to say... It was my ego." In 2012, Haufrecht said that her early career change, however rewarding in the long run, was born of necessity:

After I was done with Can-Can, I auditioned for a lot of shows, and I couldn't get anything... One day, I auditioned - I don't know if it was Damn Yankees - [but] it was a Bob Fosse show. And I'm down to the last fifteen and he needed twelve, or something like that. He pulls me aside and says, "I'd love to use you, Marcia. You're a wonderful dancer, you really are. But you're too short." I said to myself, "That's it; I'm outta here. I'm not dancing anymore."

=== Acting ===
Within a year or so, Haufrecht was working with Nola Chilton, a New York-based acting teacher and director. (Note: As an actor, Chilton had been directed by future Actors Studio head Lee Strasberg; she herself would go on to direct such actors as Richard Ward, Jack Gilford, Zero Mostel, Joseph Chaikin, Jack Betts, and Jean Shepherd. As a teacher, Chilton instructed Chaikin and several other future founding members of the experimental Open Theatre, created by them in early 1963, less than a year after Chilton's emigration to Israel, where she has worked and prospered for the nearly half century since, becoming a storied and seminal figure in Israeli arts and letters.) Haufrecht studied with Chilton for approximately four years, culminating in her participation in an Off-Broadway revival of Sidney Kingsley's Dead End, staged by Chilton.

Village Voice critic Michael Smith, praised both performance (including Haufrecht's "spectacularly destroyed whore") and production. However, she seriously contemplated giving up acting altogether because of dissatisfaction with her own contribution and with the quality of her work in general and her perceived lack of progress. Quickly dissuaded by her colleagues, Leibman in particular, Haufrecht followed the latter's advice and joined him at The Actors Studio to meet with studio director Lee Strasberg. Allowed to sit in on sessions on an interim basis, Haufrecht eventually earned her full membership via audition.

A member of the Studio since at least 1964, Haufrecht is a veteran of stage and screen, in roles ranging from White Cargo's exotic femme fatale, Tondeleyo (her final appearance as Marcia Howard), to Richard III's eloquent nemesis, Queen Elizabeth, opposite Al Pacino (in the first of Pacino's three Richard's). She has performed at Lincoln Center, La MaMa, The Public Theater, with The Ensemble Studio Theatre, Center Stage in Baltimore, at the Adelphi Festival Theatre in Garden City, The Open Stage in Sarasota, in Montreal at Place des Arts, and in Berlin at the Friends of the Opera Theatre. Haufrecht's film appearances have, in recent years, included The Producers, The Night Listener, Anamorph, and Win Win; on TV, she has been seen in The Sopranos, as well as Law & Order, Law and Order: SVU, and Law and Order: Criminal Intent.

In April 2001, more than 20 years after its first production, Tennessee Williams' Will Mr. Merriweather Return from Memphis? premiered in New York at Haufrecht's Common Basis Theatre, with Haufrecht starring. Daily News critic Howard Kissel wrote, "The play's heady combination of black humor and poetry is best handled by Marcia Haufrecht, as the woman pining for her former boarder." Ken Jaworski of Off-Off-Broadway Review added:

As Louise McBride, Marcia Haufrecht was exquisite: a frail woman struggling to appear strong, an aging southern belle masking loneliness behind false laughter. "Even in a dream one can suffer," Louise claims. Haufrecht embodied the premise, projecting a drowsy, fatigued lonesomeness with each action and word.

The previous month, Haufrecht had garnered even stronger praise from Off-Off-Broadway Review's Doug DeVita as Common Basis staged another, less heralded premiere, Grace Cavalieri's Pinecrest Rest Haven:

A frail-looking woman, her white hair tied up in a simple purple ribbon, enters a peach-and-white nursing-home waiting room and plaintively asks if anyone has seen her husband. The question, asked with a heartbreaking, bewildered innocence by the haunting Marcia Haufrecht, is a startlingly lucid depiction of the loss of clarity that can come with advanced age... the one thing this production had going for it was the presence of Haufrecht, who effortlessly rose above the obvious material and gave a luminous, moving performance of concise truth... As the late, great Madeline Kahn once said about her own work: "I have appeared in crap, but I have never treated it as such. Never." Haufrecht obviously goes by that same standard, and her performance displayed a level of professionalism that most actors would do well to emulate.

=== Writing ===
From a playwright whose initial motivation had simply been to provide – at a director/colleague's request – an interesting acting vehicle for herself, Haufrecht's plays have been produced in New York City by Common Basis Theatre, The Ensemble Studio Theatre, and The Actors Studio, and, in upstate New York, by Performing Arts of Woodstock. Around the country, her work has been performed in Texas, Florida, in San Francisco, and, in Southern California, by Company of Angels and CSU Fullerton. Abroad, her plays have been staged in New Zealand, Australia at La Mama in Melbourne, and at the Kultur im Gugg in Austria.

=== Directing ===
As a director, Haufrecht has staged both original works and revivals at The Ensemble Studio Theatre, The Actors Studio, The Barrow Street Theatre, The Common Basis Theatre, and in Australia, Portugal, and Austria .

=== Teaching ===
A student of Lee Strasberg from the early 1960s until his death, Haufrecht taught at the Lee Strasberg Theatre Institute for five years; later, she worked for two years as an adjunct professor in Columbia University's graduate film program. Haufrecht has taught and coached privately for over thirty years; her students include Ellen Barkin, Alec Baldwin, Uma Thurman, Janine Turner, John Leguizamo, Debi Mazar, Loren Dean, David Duchovny, Ian Buchanan, and Harvey Keitel. She taught for several years in Australia, and in Austria; more recently, she has taught, and continues to teach, in Lisbon, Portugal, since the mid-1990s. In New York, Haufrecht was on the faculty of The Actors Studio MFA program at The New School for Social Research (where Haufrecht would remain when the MFA program departed for Pace University in 2006, staying there until her retirement in 2011).

== Stage and screen credits ==
=== Theatre (partial listing) ===
These are acting credits except where otherwise indicated.

Opened	Title	Written by	Theater Company (and/or venue)	Directed by	Role
1954-09-08	The Flies	Euripides	Cherry Lane Theatre	Denis Vaughan	Third Fury
1955-01-27	Plain and Fancy	Music - Albert Hague / Lyrics - Arnold Horwitt / Book - Joseph Stein, Will Glickman	The Mark Hellinger Theatre	Morton DaCosta	Dancer (as Marcia Howard)
1955-06-25	Can-Can	Music & lyrics - Cole Porter / book - Abe Burrows	National Tour	Abe Burrows	Dancer (as Marcia Howard)
1960-10-25	Dead End	Sidney Kingsley	Orphans Unlimited (Note: The name of this ad hoc 'company' would appear to be an inside joke by director Chilton, at the expense of Equity Library Theatre, under whose auspices this production had been prepared and was to have been presented, presumably at its customary venue, the Lenox Hill Playhouse. Instead, at the eleventh hour, ELT's managing director Lyle Dye Jr. pulled the plug, calling the production "not quite up to standard," even professing concern for the actors' - and ELT's - "reputations." Speaking nine years later, Haufrecht maintained that ELT simply found the show too violent. In any event, Chilton's rapidly implemented response - a sit-in by the director and her entire, suddenly 'orphaned' 45-member cast in front of the Lenox Hill Playhouse - led Actors Equity to override ELT, forcing the latter to provide an alternate venue. Chilton and her cast were roundly applauded for their efforts in a review published in the Village Voice (which also made a point of contrasting Chilton's production favorably with the sort of showcase fare typically offered by ELT).) / 41st Street Theatre (on Broadway south of Times Square)	Nola Chilton	Francie (as Marcia Howard)
1960-12-29	White Cargo	Leon Gordon	Players Theatre (in Greenwich Village)	Sam Rosen	Tondeleyo (as Marcia Howard)
1964-06-22	The Three Sisters	Anton Chekhov	The Actors Studio Theatre / Morosco Theatre	Lee Strasberg	Carnival person
1965-01-06	Galileo	Bertolt Brecht	Theatre of the Living Arts (in Philadelphia)	Andre Gregory	Street singer
1968-01-25	Tom Paine	Paul Foster	La MaMa	Tom O'Horgan	Principal
1968-04-11	Having Fun In the Bathroom	Leonard Melfi	La MAMa	Edward Setrakian	Felicia
1969-06-15	Our Bed is Green	Aviva Ravel	Place des Arts	Howard Ryshpan	Rivka
1972-10-__	Once Again and Yet Again / Night / Eve	Marcia Haufrecht	Performing Arts of Woodstock	NA	Written by
1973-02-__	Richard III	William Shakespeare	Theater Company of Boston	NA	Queen Elizabeth (Standby for Linda Selman)
1973-08-__	The Independence of Striva Kowardsky	Marcia Haufrecht	Performing Arts of Woodstock	NA	Written by
1974-10-30	Mert and Phil	Anne Burr	New York Shakespeare Festival / Vivian Beaumont Theater	Joseph Papp	Mert, Lucille (standby for Estelle Parsons and Rhoda Gemignani)
1977-11-17	Eulogy for a Small Time Thief	Miguel Piñero	Ensemble Studio Theatre	Jack Gelber	Tina
1978-02-14	Curse of the Starving Class	Sam Shepard	New York Shakespeare Festival / Public Theater	Robert Woodruff	Ella (understudy for Olympia Dukakis)
1979-04-03	I Don't Know Where You're Coming From At All	Shirley Lauro	Ensemble Studio Theatre	NA	Miss Sarah Berlin
1979-05-02	Welfare	Marcia Haufrecht	Ensemble Studio Theatre	Anthony McKay	Written by
1981	The Hunchback of Notre Dame	NA	New York Shakespeare Festival / Public Theater	NA	Mme. Muniere
1981-04-21	On Bliss Street in Sunnyside	Marcia Haufrecht	The Actors Studio	NA	Alegra Katz (also Written by)
1981-10-28	Accumulated Baggage	Marcia Haufrecht	American Theatre of Actors (ATA in New York City)	Sharon Chatten	NA (also Written by)
1982-07-08	The House of Blue Leaves	John Guare	Adelphi Festival Theater (in Garden City)		Bunny
1982-1983	On Bliss Street in Sunnyside	Marcia Haufrecht	Siesta Keys Actors Theatre (in Sarasota)	NA	Written by
1984-03-09	Bliss Street	Marcia Haufrecht	The Open Stage (in Sarasota)	William Shroder	Alegra Katz (also Written by)
1988-09-27	Full Moon & High Tide in the Ladies Room	Marcia Haufrecht	Company of Angels / West End Stage (in Los Angeles)	Carol Ries	Written by
1989-05-__	Welfare	Marcia Haufrecht	Minority Actors Guild / South Dallas Cultural Center	NA	Written by
1989-11-__	An Exchange	Marcia Haufrecht	La Mama (Melbourne) / La Mama Theatre	Marcia Haufrecht	Written by & Directed by
1993-09-16	Full Moon & High Tide in the Ladies Room	Marcia Haufrecht	Creative Voices Theatre Company / Creative Place Theatre (in New York City)	Diane Cossa	Written by
1994-03-__	Promethea Bound and Sisyphus Too	Marcia Haufrecht	La Mama (Melbourne) / Napier Street Theatre (in New Zealand)	Marcia Haufrecht	Written by & Directed by
1996-03-14	The House of Nancy Dunn	Music - Steve Weisberg / Andy Craft / Howard Pflanzer	La MaMa	John James Hickey	Gloria Doria
2000-10-26	Full Moon & High Tide in the Ladies Room	Marcia Haufrecht	Common Basis Theatre	Marcia Haufrecht	Written by & Directed by
2001-03-15	Pinecrest Rest Haven	Grace Cavalieri	Common Basis Theatre	Amy Coleman	Mrs. P
2001-04-12	Will Mr. Merriweather Return from Memphis?	Tennessee Williams	Common Basis Theatre	Dan Isaac	Louise McBride
2009-01-20	The Daughters of Eve	Mark Borkowski	Barrow Street Theatre	Marcia Haufrecht	Directed by
2009-12-__	The Daughters of Eve	Mark Borkowski	Cherry Lane Studio Theatre	Marcia Haufrecht	Directed by

=== Television ===
Air Date	Title	Role
1989-12-03	No Place Like Home (TV movie)	Hilda
1998-10-07	Law & Order - "DWB"	Linda Coffey
1999-01-17	The Sopranos - "46 Long"	Fanny
2000-11-29	Law & Order - "Amends"	Brenda Jenks
2001-03-04	The Sopranos - "Proshai, Livushka"	Fanny
2001-04-27	Law & Order: SVU - "Parasites"	Mrs. Varella
2003-04-27	Law & Order: Criminal Intent - "Cherry Red"	Erin Finoff
2009-11-06	Law & Order - "Doped"	Eileen (as Marica Haufrecht)

=== Film ===
Release date	Title	Role
1966	The Three Sisters	Neighbor
1975-09-21	Dog Day Afternoon	Neighbor
1979	Night-Flowers	Woman at Wrestling Match
1989-10-23	Mortal Sins	Elevator Passenger
1996-01	The Daytrippers	Molly
2000	New York Socialite (short subject)	Guru
2003	Three Long Years	Jude's Mother
2004-03-14	Mind the Gap	Sady
2004-06-03	Marcus' Story (short subject)	Janet Silverman
2005-12-16	The Producers	Mrs. Trevors
2006-01-21	The Night Listener	Pant-Suited Woman (as Marcia Halfrecht)
2007-04-20	The Ungodly	Klara
2007-09-21	Anamorph	Diner Waitress
2009	Two Star State of Mind (video)	Nancy Willoughby
2009	The Ride (short subject)	Nancy
2011-01-21	Win Win	Gina Flaherty
2012	Subterranean Love (short subject)	Accordion Lady
2013-09-10	All Is Bright	Bartender #1
2018	Diane	Carol Rymanowski
