= Joe E. Jeffreys =

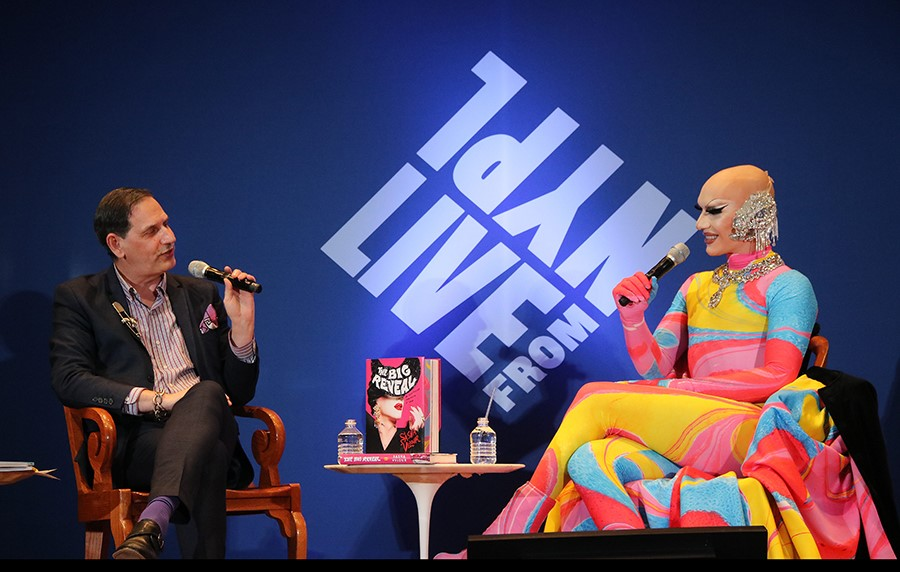
Joe E. Jeffreys and Sasha Velour in public conversation at the New York Public Library

Joe E. Jeffreys is an American drag historian, video artist, and dramaturg. He is an adjunct instructor at the New York University Tisch School of the Arts. An authority on the cultural history and significance of drag, Jeffreys has been quoted in a wide variety of media platforms including The New York Times, The Washington Post, USA Today, The Guardian, BBC, Vice, Entertainment Tonight, History.com, CNN's The Whole Story with Anderson Cooper and the miniseries PRIDE on FX.

Jeffreys has published hundreds of feature articles as well as book and theatre reviews in the popular press — The Village Voice, Time Out New York, The Advocate and Outweek. He has also published scholarly articles on drag in academic journals including The Drama Review, Theatre History Studies, and Women & Performance. He has presented talks on drag at Harvard University, the New York Public Library, community and corporate venues.

His video documentaries preserving the moving image record of drag have been screened worldwide, including the at Tate Modern in London, the Museum of Arts and Design, and as part of the opening of the new Whitney Museum of American Art. His work also appears on his YouTube channel “Drag Show Video Verite” and “JoeEJeffreys” on Vimeo.

Jeffreys has served as dramaturg on more than a dozen stage productions, including the world premiere of Tennessee Williams’ last full-length play, In Masks Outrageous and Austere, the New York City premiere of Williams’ Green Eyes, and Michael Baron's The Whore of Sheridan Square, a play inspired by the life of Charles Ludlam.

Formerly an adjunct instructor at Stony Brook University, Jeffreys currently serves as adjunct instructor in New York University Tisch School of the Arts Drama Department and the Undergraduate Film and Television Department. He is also an instructor at The New School's Eugene Lang College of Liberal Arts. He has taught NYU Drama's LGBTQ+ performance class for many years, and developed a full-semester course at The New School, “RuPaul’s Drag Race & Its Impact,” that explores the reality TV phenomenon.

== Early life, education, and introduction to drag ==
Jeffreys was born in North Carolina, and raised on a tobacco farm outside Zebulon, N.C. by adoptive parents. After receiving a BA in English at Wake Forest University, Jeffreys earned an MFA in Dramaturgy at Stony Brook University. At New York University, he received a PhD with distinction in Performance Studies, completing a dissertation entitled “An Outre Entree into the Para-Ridiculous Histrionics of Drag Diva Ethyl Eichelberger: A True Story.”

Jeffreys recalled being captivated by his first encounter with a drag performance. “The drag queen serves this kind of shaman role, this kind of court-fool role [in which] they are allowed to say and do things that the culture perhaps needs to look at,” Jeffreys told TIME in 2018.

== Drag historian and pundit ==
Numerous journalists have sought Jeffreys’ comments and observations on the art form's history and popularity.

Reporters from The New York Times turned to Jeffreys for his insights into the political controversy surrounding drag story hours, the evolution of goth or “distorted drag” and 2022's five-city, 10-show Taco Bell Drag Brunch. “It’s taken drag over a border that it hasn’t been before, to an exciting new place of accessibility,” he told a reporter.

A 2019 article in The New York Post focused on the launch of Jeffreys’ semester-long course at The New School, “RuPaul’s Drag Race & Its Impact.” “I put this class together not only due to my love of drag performance but also to spark serious critical thought and analysis into something many people would poo-poo as not worthy of such deep concern,” Jeffreys said. That same year the full cast of RuPaul’s Drag Race season 11 made a surprise pit stop to the class. The full cast of season 12 visited the next year.

Additional articles featuring Jeffreys as a drag expert have been published by Slate,Out, Popsugar.com,Food and Wine and The New York Times Magazine.

== Film and TV ==
Jeffreys is featured as a commentator in the documentaries P.S. Burn This Letter Please (2021),Ruminations (2018) and In Search of Avery Willard (2012).

CNN's The Whole Story with Anderson Cooper interviewed Jeffreys for the episode “Drag War.” Jeffreys was a consultant to the PBS American Masters web series Masters of Drag. The six-part 2021 miniseries PRIDE, which premiered on FX, included Jeffreys in the episode devoted to LGBT life in the 1960s. Jeffreys was a commentator and contributing videographer for the 2011 documentary Miss Rose Wood.

== Videographer ==
In 2007—using a video camera gifted to him by the drag king and performance artist Shelly Mars, and acting upon the advice of drag queen Flawless Sabrina—Jeffreys began using video to capture and preserve drag performances. Archivist Robert Coddington introduced Jeffreys to the videos of Nelson Sullivan, and Jeffreys "immediately recognized the power of Sullivan’s videos to capture and preserve past performances," according to an article in Vice. “I don’t know if that’s what Nelson was trying to do, what his intent was, but to some extent, that’s what it’s become. It’s a gift to the future, capturing the past and the moment. This is the moment I’m in right now, let’s point and shoot and see what happens," Jeffreys said.

In 2007, Jeffreys began producing Drag Show Video Verite, a multi-platform project to preserve and screen the moving image record of New York City's past and current drag scenes. Jeffreys produced and edited five annual versions of this NYC drag supercut. All premiered the New York Public Library for the Performing Arts at Lincoln Center, with additional screenings at La Mama, Dixon Place and Judson Memorial Church.

Time Out called Drag Show Video Verite “a beloved, nostalgic Pride month tradition: a video mash-up of scenes from NYC’s drag world that spans more than 50 years.” In a 2009 interview, Jeffreys told The Guardian the contents of Drag Show Video Verite represented only a fraction of his moving image drag archive, which he estimated at “hundreds of hours, possibly thousands.” He continues videotaping to this day. Jeffreys’ video projects have been awarded funding from the Lower Manhattan Cultural Council and the Jerome Foundation.

Jeffreys videography has been featured in several films, including Ruminations (a 2018 profile of Rumi Missabu founding member of San Francisco's Cockettes), Uncle Bob about the life and murder of Robert Opel and Exposed, an award-winning documentary by Beth B. focused on the neo-burlesque scene.

Jeffreys produced and directed the 2009 short film Dorian: A Picture, about the 1950-60s female impersonator Dorian Wayne. It was selected for screening at numerous festivals, including NewFest, the London Lesbian and Gay Film Festival, the Southwest Lesbian and Gay Film Festival.

== Dramaturg ==
Jeffreys has worked as dramaturg on numerous stage productions. He is credited as dramaturg on the 2003 production of Charles Ludlam's Conquest of the Universe or When Queens Collide at the Ohio Theatre in New York City. Two years later, he was dramaturg on The Whore of Sheridan Square at La Mama in New York City. Based on Ludlam's life, Michael Baron's comedic re-imaging of Sunset Boulevard drew praise from The New York Times: “For many downtown theatregoers, The Whore of Sheridan Square will be a nostalgic kick, like bumping into an old friend you haven’t seen in a long time.”

Jeffreys served as dramaturg on the 2010 New York premiere of Tennessee Williams’ Green Eyes, directed by Travis Chamberlain and starring Erin Markey at the Hudson Hotel in New York City. The New Yorker said, “the play is gorgeous: a short, eloquent evening that feels complete, complex, and entirely satisfying.”

In 2012, Jeffreys was dramaturg for the world premiere of Williams’ final full-length play, In Masks Outrageous and Austere, at 45 Bleeker in New York. It was directed by David Schweizer and starred Shirley Knight. Backstage called the show “a fascinating mess …. which despite its flaws is a must-see for any serious Williams fan.”

In Chicago in 2019, Jeffreys served as a research consultant for Steppenwolf Theatre Company's production Ms. Black for President. The play by Tarell Alvin McCraney and Tina Landau tells the story of drag queen Joan Jett Blakk's 1992 run for president and her crashing of the Democratic National Convention. Blakk and crew headquartered at Jeffreys’ New York City apartment during the convention.

== Writer ==
Jeffreys has written numerous articles and reviews for publications from zines to academic journals as well as book chapters and encyclopedia entries. The bulk of these published works concern drag past and present or contemporary gay authors. Gay author interviews include Dennis Cooper, John Rechy, JT Leroy, and Christopher Rice.

Jeffreys' published writing on the history of drag includes articles on Charles Ludlam, Charles Busch, The Lady Chablis, Barbette, Lypsinka, Joan Jett Blakk, The 82 Club, and Ethyl Eichelberger

Jeffreys wrote the illustrated booklet for Kino Lorber's Blu-ray release of their 4k restoration of the 1968 drag documentary The Queen.
