= Cara Duff-MacCormick =

Canadian actress

- Born: December 12, 1944 (age 80); Woodstock, Ontario, Canada
- Education: American Academy of Dramatic Arts
- Occupation: Actress

Cara Duff-MacCormick (born December 12, 1944) is a Canadian actress, predominantly in the theatre.

== Early life and education ==
Born in Woodstock, Ontario, Duff-MacCormick studied acting at the American Academy of Dramatic Arts in New York City.

== Career ==
Duff-MacCormick made her professional debut Off-Broadway in December 1969 at the Cherry Lane Theatre as Faith Detweiler in Harold J. Chapler's Love Your Crooked Neighbor.

She made her Broadway debut as Shelly in Michael Weller's Moonchildren in 1972, a role she had performed the year before at the Arena Stage in 1971. For this performance the actress won a Theatre World Award and garnered a Tony Award nomination. Because Duff-MacCormick was performing in a production at the Wayside Theatre when she won the Theatre World Award, her mother accepted the award on her behalf.

The following year she returned to Broadway to portray Clare in Tennessee Williams's play Out Cry at the Lyceum Theatre and played Nina in Anton Chekhov's The Seagull at the McCarter Theatre in Princeton, New Jersey. In 1975, she won an Obie Award for her performance in Craig's Wife.

In 1976, Duff-MacCormick was nominated for a Drama Desk Award for her portrayal of Julia Craven in George Bernard Shaw's The Philanderer with the Roundabout Theatre Company. That same year she also played Helen in Kevin O'Morrison's Ladyhouse Blues at the Marymount Manhattan Theatre and played Tammy Ulrich in the film All the President's Men.

In 1977, she starred in Albert Innaurato's Earthworms at Playwrights Horizons. In 1978 she portrayed the role of Hakon's wife in Ibsen's The Pretenders alongside Randall Duk Kim and Stephen Lang at the Guthrie Theater, Minneapolis. That same year she played Agafya Tikhonovna in Nikolai Gogol's Marriage, also at the Guthrie Theatre.

She appeared frequently at the Repertory Theatre of St. Louis during the 1970s, including portraying the roles of Mrs. Sullen in George Farquhar's The Beaux' Stratagem (1976), Bananas in John Guare's The House of Blue Leaves (1977), Judith Anderson in Shaw's The Devil's Disciple (1977) and Sister Rita in The Runner Stumbles (1978).

In 1980, Duff-MacCormick played Monique in Michel Tremblay's Bonjour, La, Bonjour at the Marymount Manhattan Theatre alongside Veronica Castang and Dianne Wiest. The following year she returned to Broadway to appear in Eddie Lawrence's Animals at the Princess Theatre. In 1982 she played Peggy Grant in a revival of The Front Page and the following year played Carrie in Paul Kember's Not Quite Jerusalem, both at the Long Wharf Theater.

In 1985, she appeared Off-Broadway at the American Theater Exchange as Claire in Heather McDonald's Faulkner's Bicycle and she appeared at the Actors Theatre of Louisville as Carolyn Rose in Lee Blessing's War of the Roses, followed by a portrayal of Barbara Mears in Tom Strelich's Neon Psalms at the American Place Theatre in 1986.

In 1987, she appeared at the Hartford Stage as Barbara in A. R. Gurney's Children. She returned to the Playwrights Horizons in 1989 to perform the role of Natalie Bauer Lechner in Albert Innaurato's Gus and Al.

In 1992, she played Queen Isabella in Christopher Marlowe's Edward II at the Yale Repertory Theatre. That same year she appeared in a guest-starring role on Law & Order in the episode "Point of View".

== Filmography ==
=== Film ===
Year	Title	Role	Notes
1976	All the President's Men	Tammy Ulrich	Uncredited
1978	Rush It	Extra Cast	
1979	A Pleasure Doing Business	Filing lady	

=== Television ===
Year	Title	Role	Notes
1992	Law & Order	Maggie Duff	Episode: "Point of View"
