= The Magic Tower and Other One-Act Plays =

The Magic Tower and Other One-Act Plays is a collection of 15 plays, seven of them previously unpublished, by American playwright Tennessee Williams. Published by New Directions in New York City in 2011, Williams' scholar Thomas Keith edited the volume and provided the critical notes while playwright Terrence McNally, winner of four Tony Awards, wrote the foreword.

Ten of the plays, composed between 1936 and 1941, predate Williams' first public success in 1944 with The Glass Menagerie and may be accounted apprentice works. Other plays collected here are one-act sketches or studies for later full-length plays: "The Pretty Trap" (1944) for The Glass Menagerie, "Interior: Panic" (1946) for A Streetcar Named Desire, "Kingdom of Earth" (1967) for The Seven Descents of Myrtle, "I Never Get Dressed Till After Dark on Sundays" (1973) for Vieux Carré, and "Some Problems for the Moose Lodge" (1980) for A House Not Meant to Stand.

== Plays ==
- "At Liberty"
- "The Magic Tower"
- "Me, Vashya"
- "Curtains for the Gentleman"
- "In Our Profession"
- "Every Twenty Minutes"
- "Honor the Living"
- "The Case of the Crushed Petunias"
- "Moony's Kid Don't Cry"
- "The Dark Room"
- "The Pretty Trap"
- "Interior: Panic"
- "Kingdom of Earth"
- "I Never Get Dressed Till After Dark on Sundays"
- "Some Problems for the Moose Lodge"

== See also ==
- List of one-act plays by Tennessee Williams
