= The Traveling Companion and Other Plays =

- First edition of The Traveling Companion and Other Plays
- Original language: English
- Written by: Tennessee Williams
- Genre: Drama, LGBT literature

The Traveling Companion and Other Plays is a collection of experimental plays written by American playwright Tennessee Williams and published by New Directions and in New York City in 2008. It is edited by Williams scholar Annette J. Saddik, who provides the introduction.

The majority of the plays are from the last decades of Williams's life, and are markedly different from those for which he is most known, departing from Southern locales, melodrama and naturalism, and showing the influence of Noh theatre and the Theatre of the Absurd. The plays have never before been collected and some are previously unpublished.

== Plays ==
- The Chalky White Substance
- The Day on Which a Man Dies (An Occidental Noh Play)
- A Cavalier for Milady
- The Pronoun "I"
- The Remarkable Rooming-House of Mme. Le Monde
- Kirche, Kueche, Kinder (An Outrage for the Stage)
- Green Eyes
- The Parade, or Approaching the End of a Summer
- The One Exception
- Sunburst
- Will Mr. Merriweather Return from Memphis?
- The Traveling Companion

== See also ==
- List of one-act plays by Tennessee Williams

== Extended reading ==
- New Directions page
- New Directions Publishing Corporation
