= The Orchard Project =

- Formation: 1971
- Founder: Eve Adamson
- Type: Theatre group
- Location: New York City
- Website: orchardproject.com
- Formerly called: Jean Cocteau Repertory

The Orchard Project is a resident theatre company in New York City.

== History ==
Jean Cocteau Repertory (often called "the Cocteau" or "Cocteau Rep") was founded in 1971 by Eve Adamson, who named it in honor of French playwright, director and artist Jean Cocteau. "The Cocteau" had a reputation for serious and respectful productions of classical plays.

Jean Cocteau Repertory's first home was on Bond Street near the Bowery. Adamson envisioned a permanent acting ensemble that would perform classical plays in rotating repertory. Actors in the company were cast in both large and small roles and, in the theatre's early years, they also served alongside the founder as staff members. Adamson, who remained artistic director until 1989, directed more than 100 productions of plays by a wide range of playwrights for the company.

The Cocteau's opening season included a play by Cocteau, Orphée, in addition to works by William Shakespeare and Oscar Wilde. In 1973, the company implemented the repertory format it maintained in subsequent decades and received some of its first wide acclaim, for a production of Samuel Beckett's Waiting for Godot. In 1974, the company moved into the 140-seat Bouwerie Lane Theater. In 1981, Tennessee Williams chose the Cocteau to premiere his new play Something Cloudy, Something Clear. In 2006, under new leadership, the company abandoned its name, its longtime location and its established style.

== Directors ==
Robert Hupp replaced Adamson as artistic director in 1989, but she continued to direct plays for the Cocteau. In 1992 Hupp partnered with Scott Shattuck, who was eventually named producing artistic director. When they left in 1999, Shattuck and Hupp were replaced by David Fuller, who had been an actor with the company in the Something Cloudy, Something Clear era.

Fuller began to unionize the acting company, but four of its longtime members (along with some board members) left in 2004 and formed the Phoenix Theater Ensemble. Both Fuller and one of the actors blamed artistic differences for the split. In 2007, in the midst of difficulties with its finances, audience base and artistic reputation, the company was renamed The Exchange and set out to produce new works.

== Company members ==
In addition to its founder, Jean Cocteau Repertory was strongly associated with its longest-tenured acting company members, including Craig Smith (who performed in more than 200 productions for the Cocteau starting in 1973) and Elise Stone (a member of the ensemble from 1985). They were among the artists that left the company in 2004.

Besides staging works from the past such as Restoration comedies and plays by historic authors such as Anton Chekhov, the Cocteau was known for productions of plays by major 20th century European playwrights such as Harold Pinter and Luigi Pirandello.
