= Something Cloudy, Something Clear =

1941 play written by Tennessee Williams

First edition cover (New Directions)

Something Cloudy, Something Clear is an autobiographical play by Tennessee Williams that was originally written in 1941 as a short play titled The Parade, or Approaching the End of a Summer, which was produced posthumously in Provincetown in 2006. In 1962, Williams retitled and expanded The Parade into a full-length play that was first produced Off-Off-Broadway in 1981. Both versions of the play are set on the wharfs of Provincetown, Massachusetts, and tell the story of a young playwright named August dealing with his unrequited homosexual love for another man.

The situations and characters in both were "clearly drawn from a very autobiographical foundation," with August's dilemma reflecting a relationship Williams had in Provincetown with "his actual lover for [one] summer, Kip Kiernan." The Parade was written after a fight with Kiernan, and Williams reflected in 1962 that "[the version of Kip in that play] is very completely different from Kip as he was. When someone hurts us deeply, we no longer see them at all clearly. Not until time has put them back in focus."

Williams' revised version of the play, titled Something Cloudy, Something Clear, opened on August 24, 1981 at The Bouwerie Lane Theatre in New York City to unenthusiastic reviews.

It received its British professional premiere at the Finborough Theatre in London in 2003 with James Hillier in the lead role as August, where it sold out for the entire run.
