= Moonchildren =

Play written by Michael Weller

Moonchildren (originally titled Cancer) is a play by Brooklyn-based playwright Michael Weller. The play chronicles a year in the life of the "moonchildren" referred to in the title: eight college students living communally together in an off-campus attic in the mid-1960s.

== Productions ==
The work was first performed in 1970 with the title Cancer in London at the Royal Court Theater under the direction of Peter Gill. Weller changed the name to Moonchildren shortly thereafter for the work's American premiere at the Arena Stage (Washington, DC) in November 1971, which was directed by Alan Schneider.

The Arena Stage production moved to the Royale Theatre on Broadway the following year, giving its first of 28 performances on February 11, 1972. The cast included Kevin Conway as Mike, Maureen Anderman as Ruth, Edward Herrmann as Cootie, Christopher Guest as Norman, Stephen Collins as Dick, Jill Eikenberry as Kathy, James Woods as Bob Rettie, Cara Duff-MacCormick as Shelly, Donegan Smith as Ralph, Robert Prosky as Mr. Willis, Ron McLarty as Lucky, Louis Zorich as Bream, Peter Alzado as Effing, Salem Ludwig as Uncle Murry, George Curley as Cootie's Father, and Michael Tucker as Milkman. Duff-MacCormick garnered a Tony Award nomination for best Featured Actress in a play and Weller won a Drama Desk Award for Most Promising Playwright. Anderman, Duff-MacCormick, and Woods all won Theatre World Awards for their portrayals.

== Reviews ==
The play has been deemed a "seminal work" for Weller and is according to one reviewer:

a stunning work, one that has weathered the years to become that rarity, a contemporary play that, while rooted in the era in which it was written, remains contemporary because its underlying themes are universal and unchanging.

According to a review in The New York Times, Weller wrote this play about the generation that came of age during the Vietnam War "with a discerning eye and a journalist's detachment".

== Awards and nominations ==
=== Original Broadway production ===
Year	Award	Category	Nominee	Result
1972	Tony Award	Best Featured Actress in a Play	Cara Duff-MacCormick	Nominated
1972	Drama Desk Award	Most Promising Playwright	Michael Weller	Won
1972	Theatre World Award		Maureen Anderman, James Woods and Cara Duff-MacCormick	Won
