= The Two-Character Play =

Play by Tennessee Williams

- Original language: English
- Written by: Tennessee Williams
- Characters: Claire; Felice

Premiere
- Date: December 1967
- Place: Hampstead Theatre; London

The Two-Character Play (also known as Out Cry in one of its alternate versions) is an American play by Tennessee Williams that premiered in London at the Hampstead Theatre in December 1967. Williams himself had great affection for the play, and described it as "My most beautiful play since Streetcar, the very heart of my life."

== Background ==
After winning critical and popular acclaim with his earlier plays, Williams wanted to experiment and expand his writing style. His later creations had more in common with playwrights Samuel Beckett and the emerging Harold Pinter than with what the name Tennessee Williams had come to signify. Although the play is a marked departure from the naturalism of his classics, familiar themes permeate it. Confinement due to mental illness, repression leading to social isolation and the tyranny and claustrophobia that come from impinging on one another's psychological and physical space are all present in The Two-Character Play.

When the play premiered in its various versions, it was not well received by critics or audiences. Clare and Felice, the actors, as well as the characters they play, cannot, no matter how hard they try to delude themselves, escape from the reality of their deteriorating mental states. Consequently, the viewers themselves are confronted with the darker truths of what it is to be human.

It was very experimental for its time. The language is heightened. There are slabs of verbosity juxtaposed with pauses and stunted sentences.

The Two-Character Play is partially autobiographical. The actor Clare and especially the character Clare are loosely based on Williams’ sister, Rose, and the actor Felice and the character Felice on Williams himself. The "confining nature of human existence" was a major theme throughout his work and this play is seen to be his most personal interpretation.

It took Williams over ten years to write The Two-Character Play, longer than any of his other plays.

== Plot ==
The characters in this play, Felice and Clare, are two actors on tour; they are also brother and sister. They find themselves deserted by their acting troupe in a decrepit "state theatre in an unknown state". Faced (perhaps) by an audience expecting a performance, they enact The Two-Character Play. Out Cry, a second version of this work, premiered at the Ivanhoe Theatre in Chicago in July 1971 and had its Broadway premiere, directed by Peter Glenville and co-starring Michael York and Cara Duff-MacCormick, in 1973, running from March 1 to 10 at the Lyceum Theater following one preview performance on February 28.

The plot is confusing and difficult to follow, with little sense of a resolution. The Two-Character Play has a concurrent double plot with the convention of a play within a play scenario. The characters of Clare and Felice are psychologically damaged from witnessing the traumatic murder/suicide of their parents. They have remained recluses in the family home since the incident and are attempting to make hesitant contact with the outside world. As the actors dip in and out of performance, improvising parts not memorised or not yet written, it becomes increasingly difficult to differentiate the actors from the characters and reality from theatrics.

== Performances ==
The London premiere featured Peter Wyngarde and Mary Ure, and its director was James Roose-Evans. Williams then revised the play, and the revised version, under the title of Out Cry, received its first performance in Chicago with Donald Madden and Eileen Herlie.

The play was produced in San Francisco before it moved to Broadway. David Merrick produced the play on Broadway in 1973, under the title of Out Cry.

A 30th Anniversary production (of the 1975 version) was staged in Australia in 2005 at the University of Melbourne with siblings Stephen Ryan and Sarah Ryan playing the roles of Felice and Clare. For his performance as Felice, Stephen Ryan won the Murray Sutherland Prize for the most outstanding performance in a dramatic production at the University of Melbourne. San Francisco's Theatre Rhinoceros staged the show in January 2012.

The play was produced at London's Jermyn Street Theatre in October 2010. The production starred Catherine Cusack and Paul McEwan, and was directed by the then-Artistic Director of the theater, Gene David Kirk.

The Two-Character Play ran Off Broadway at New World Stages from June 19 to September 29, 2013, starring Amanda Plummer and Brad Dourif.

The play was produced as a senior directorial at The College of William and Mary in October 2013. Spooky Action Theater produced the play, with David Bryan Jackson and Lee Mikeska Gardner, directed by Richard Henrich.

In March 2014, the 292 Theatre on East 3rd Street in New York City mounted a production of The Two-Character Play which ran from March 19 through April 26, directed by Romy Ashby, and starring husband and wife Charles Schick and Regina Bartkoff.

In July 2017, Playhouse Creatures Theatre Company produced an acclaimed production in New York City (at the Duo Theatre on East 4th Street). The production was directed by Austin Pendleton and starred Irene Glezos and Joseph W. Rodriguez. This production transferred to the NOLA Tennessee Williams Festival (Playhouse Creatures Theatre Company and Southern Rep co-producing), in March/April 2018.

The Two-Character Play was the first play produced by the Texas theatre company Bliss Out Productions in April 2023. The production was directed by Jax Schuck and starred Carly Geary and Blake Kump.

The Two-Character Play gets a South-Asian twist in an effort by the actors to reclaim the story from those lens. The play runs for a few nights at the Drayton Arms Theatre, starring Shreya Bore and Tanmay Sarkar as Clare and Felice respectively. The play is directed by Ramesh Bora.
