= Hard Candy: A Book of Stories =

Book by Tennessee Williams

- First edition
- Author: Tennessee Williams
- Language: English
- Publisher: New Directions Publishing
- Publication date: 1954
- Publication place: United States
- Media type: Print (hardback)
- Pages: 220
- OCLC: 6662774

Hard Candy: A Book of Stories is a collection of short stories by American writer Tennessee Williams, which was first published in 1954 by New Directions.

== Stories ==
Those stories published originally in magazines before being collected in Hard Candy are indicated.

- "Three Players of a Summer Game” (The New Yorker, October 24, 1952)
- "Two on a Party”
- "The Resemblance between a Violin Case and a Coffin” (Flair, 1950)
- "Hard Candy"
- "Rubio y Morena” (Partisan Review, December 12, 1948)
- "The Mattress by the Tomato Patch”
- "The Coming of Something to the Widow Holly”
- "The Vine” (Mademoiselle, July 1954)
- "The Mysteries of the Joy Rio”

== Critical Assessment ==
The period in which Williams wrote the stories for Hard Candy were contemporaneous with the staging of A Streetcar Named Desire (1948) with his emergence as “America’s most important playwright.”

The years 1948-1952 were a “golden age” for Williams, both personally and professionally. Literary critic and biographer Gore Vidal termed 1948 Williams’ “annus mirabilis"

Literary critic Dennis Vannatta cautions that “although this period produced a bright flowering of his short fiction, not every story written during this time is first-rate.”

In March 1954 Williams noted in a letter that he was "pulling together a short-long play based on the characters in "Three Players." The play was Cat on a Hot Tin Roof.

The 1967 paperback edition, dedicated to Jane and Paul Bowles, notes that the title piece, "Hard Candy," is a later version of "The Mysteries of the Joy Rio," yet both stories are included, despite employing the same theme and the same setting, because the accounts are so different.

== Sources ==
- Vidal, Gore. 1985. Introduction to Tennessee Williams: Collected Stories. New York Review of Books, in New Directions Publishing New York. pp. xix-xxv. ISBN 0-8112-0952-0
- Williams, Tennessee. 1985. Tennessee Williams: Collected Stories. New Directions Publishing, New York. ISBN 0-8112-0952-0
- Vannatta, Dennis. 1988. Tennessee Williams: A Study of the Short Fiction. Twayne Publishers, G. K. Hall & Co., Boston, Massachusetts. ISBN 0-8057-8304-0
