= In Masks Outrageous and Austere =

Play by Tennessee Williams

- Poster by Noah Scalin for 2012 production with Shirley Knight
- Original language: English
- Written by: Tennessee Williams
- Characters: Babe Foxworth; Billy Foxworth; Jerry; Matron; Playboy; Mac
- Subject: Corporate greed, death
- Genre: Drama, Humor
- Setting: Undisclosed remote neighborhood

Premiere
- Date: April 2012
- Place: Culture Project; New York City, New York

In Masks Outrageous and Austere is the final full-length play of Tennessee Williams, written perhaps as early as 1970, but chiefly between 1978 and the fall of 1982. The play’s literary roots for characters and situations can be found in Williams’ 1945 short story "Tent Worms". The play title is taken from a line in Elinor Wylie's poem "Let No Charitable Hope."

The play follows what Williams described as a "nightmarish", “extremely funny,” and “bizarre as hell” story involving the kidnapping of the rich southerner Babe Foxworth by a nefarious corporation.

The play finally received its world premiere in New York City in April 2012, directed by David Schweizer and starring Shirley Knight as Babe.

== Overview ==
=== Plot ===
Babe Foxworth, the world’s richest woman, has been abducted to an undisclosed coastal location. She has been brought there by the Gideons, a secret service-like security team, employed by Kudzu Chem, the clandestine corporation behind her vast wealth. With Babe are Billy Foxworth, her younger gay husband, and Jerry, his even younger male secretary from Harvard. Under a flickering Aurora Borealis, they meet their wacky neighbors from the invisible house next door, the opera singing Matron and her mentally challenged son Playboy who can only say "Coo" and is a compulsive masturbator. Mac, Matron’s gigantic husband who communicates through grunts, and his diminutive interpreter are also part of the surreal world. They play out a twisted game of survivor as the play hurtles towards a violent ending.

=== Subject matter ===
The subject of In Masks Outrageous and Austere according to Gore Vidal is death and also corporate greed. Tennessee Williams believed the play had the content of a major work, and in a 1981 Paris Review interview called the play “important,” “extremely funny,” and “bizarre as hell.”

Williams' three different versions roughly over the years 1978–1982 are cited as becoming, “more nightmarish, going from a basically realistic play with some fantastic overtones to becoming one of Williams’ most outlandish creations.” Masks Outrageous (the play’s last title) is probably the most outrageous version of the play.” “The final version combines bizarre characters, dark humor and exorbitant theatricality.”

Linda Dorff, a scholar of Williams's later works, in her NYU doctoral dissertation categorizes the play as having an "apocalyptic conspiracy plot." According to Dorff, Masks Outrageous and The Red Devil Battery Sign present "without doubt, the bleakest world views to be found in the Williams canon.... where characters are sure to meet with destruction." In it, "he (Williams) moves the frame of his drama onto a wide-angle epic stage and the frame becomes more serious..."

== Script history ==
Williams wrote the manuscript over a span of four years until his death, in 1983. It was kept private for a number of years by Gavin Lambert, who worked with Williams on it and to whom he entrusted the manuscript. Shortly before Lambert died in 2005, he released the manuscript. Scholars debate exactly how the multiple drafts developed, and who exactly was involved.

=== First manuscripts ===
While working on the original concepts for the play, Williams apparently never did an assembly of the developmental subject material to his liking. He is known for doing wide exploration of his subjects: of character, atmosphere, and story. This exploration eventually solidifies, then becomes a final assemblage and later an approved draft. It has been suggested by John Uecker, Williams's former assistant, that Williams used two plays of James Purdy's, "Children Is All" and "Cracks" as inspiration for the content and dialogue structure.

Williams wrote at least three drafts, full copies of which have been identified in Columbia University's Rare Book and Manuscript Library. Draft fragments are held at Harvard University's Houghton Library. The names of the drafts in chronological order are Tent Worms, In Masks Outrageous and Austere, and Gideon's Point. (A workshop production of Gideons' Point was produced at the Williamstown Theatre Festival in August 1982). Finally, an end draft Masks Outrageous, edited by Williams with Gavin Lambert, was placed in the Columbia University archives in New York.

Linda Dorff's work asserts the existence of only two drafts: In Masks Outrageous and Austere, and Masks Outrageous. Her 1970 date of Williams' first draft is at odds with the 1978 pointed to by other scholars. However, a draft of the play held by the New York Public Library for the Performing Arts does bear this 1970 date.

According to Prosser, Dorff is unaware of the Gideon's Point production in Williamstown (p. 375, Linda Dorff's NYU Doctoral Thesis), which is mentioned by Prosser in his book The Late Plays of Tennessee Williams.

Published scholarship is often unclear which of the script versions are being referenced and the titles Masks Outrageous and In Masks Outrageous and Austere are at times used interchangeably. This is despite the fact that the first draft (In Masks Outrageous and Austere) and last draft (Masks Outrageous) are radically different in tone and style.

=== Editors ===
Before his death, Williams entrusted the script to Gavin Lambert. Lambert is named as Editor on some of the drafts to the version Masks Outrageous. Other drafts state “revised by Gavin Lambert.” However, how much Lambert actually contributed to the drafts has been debated by scholars. According to Prosser, Lambert's contributions left no significant changes to Gideon’s Point nor Masks Outrageous, as the latter seems near identical to the former. Various Lambert drafts are held at Boston University.

In his introductions, Lambert states that he entered into the material in 1981, and also 6 months before Williams died. Linda Dorff, who interviewed Gavin Lambert in 1996, states: "According to Lambert, Williams had agreed to allow him to direct the play." She makes no assertions about his editing of it, other than his name appears as editor on the title page of an undated version.

Before Lambert died in 2005 he had interested several producers in staging Tennessee Williams's final full-length play. After his death the producers continued to develop the script for production and brought in a chain of distinguished editors and dramaturgs to bring the play more in line with the dialogue, situations and structures found in William’s original drafts.

There are two assignments of copyright at the United States Copyright Office signed January 3, 2008, and recorded January 18, 2008: one by Gore Vidal and one by Peter Bogdanovich. Although the application page says "Total number of titles in the document: 2" and the fee appears to be for two titles, the actual Assignment of Copyright states "with respect to the play Masks Outrageous (alternative title In Masks Outrageous and Austere) written by Tennessee Williams." These are two distinct versions, not a single play as evidenced in the Columbia University archives. At the United States Copyright Office, one cannot find a record affirming Lambert's editorial contribution to “Masks Outrageous".

For some time it was unknown who had editorial control of the manuscript. It appeared not to be Vidal. A version of the script dated November 6, 2007 surfaced which bears Final Reconciled Draft on the title page, but did not name Gore Vidal as editor. At one point later Vidal publicly announced that the play “may never be able to be done”.

The final reconciled script was edited by director David Schweizer and dramaturg Joe E. Jeffreys.

== Premiere ==
The play finally received its world premiere in New York City at the Culture Project on April 16, 2012. It was directed by Williams' former lover, David Schweizer. The cast included Academy Award nominee Shirley Knight as Babe and Tony nominee Alison Fraser as Mrs. Gorse-Bracken. The poster was created by artist Noah Scalin.
