= Candles to the Sun =

Play by Tennessee Williams in 1937

Candles to the Sun was the first full-length play written by Tennessee Williams to be produced. In 1939 Candles to the Sun was one of 4 one-act plays he submitted to the New York Group Theatres' American play contest, winning the $100 prize. The play is set in the Red Hills area of Alabama in a coal mining town. The story deals with the struggle of the miners to form a union while also highlighting the difficult lives of their families. The St Louis Star-Times critic Reed Hynds described the play as "an earnest and searching examination of a particular social reality set out in human and dramatic terms." It was premiered on March 18, 1937 by The Mummers, a socially aware and semi-professional theatre troupe in St. Louis, Missouri where it opened to rave reviews.
