= The Mysteries of Joy Rio =

- Short story by Tennessee Williams
- Country: United States
- Language: English

Publication
- Published in: Hard Candy: A Book of Stories
- Publication date: 1954

“The Mysteries of the Joy Rio” is a work of short fiction by Tennessee Williams. Written in 1941, the work first appeared in the collection Hard Candy: A Book of Stories (1954), published by New Directions.

== Plot ==
“The Mysteries of the Joy Rio” is told in third-person omniscient point-of-view. The narrative is presented in four sections. The story opens in a clock repair shop, owned by Pablo Gonzales. Now 40-year-old, the shop was bequeathed to him by his late mentor and lover Emiel Kroger, an elderly German-American watch repairman. Twenty years ago he engaged the 19-year-old Pablo Gonzales and fell in love with his protege.The relationship had been an affectionate one when Kroger died three years later. Pablo mourns the loss of his mentor. Pablo, a skilled repairman, runs the business successfully.

Pablo routinely walks to an old opera house, now serving as a run-down movie theatre which features cartoons and Westerns: the Joy Rio theatre. The establishment attracts mostly children and young adolescents. In Mr. Kroger's day, before he met Pablo, the upper gallery of the Joy Rio was notorious as a venue for gay men and youth. Mr. Kroger at times partook of these sexual gatherings. With its notoriety, the management closed the gallery, and it remained blocked with a “Keep Out” warning for years. In attending these showings furtively, Pablo is aware that he is seeking to emulate Mr. Kroger's experiences and assuage his loneliness. Pablo discovers he has terminal cancer; the treatments continue for a year and his health deteriorates.

On one visit to the theatre, Pablo accidentally interrupts a sexual encounter between the teenage theatre usher and his girlfriend in the public restroom. Enraged, the boy threatens to beat him, and Pablo in a panic flees to the off-limits upper gallery. In the darkened stairway, he is beckoned to by a dim figure. The voice of Emiel Kroger commands him to approach. Taking him by the arm, the apparition leads him into the recesses of the gallery. There Kroger comforts and reassures Pablo, and in whose arms Pablo peacefully dies.

== Background ==
The story was written in 1941 while Williams was residing in New Orleans, Louisiana, and collected first in Hard Candy: A Book of Stories (1954).

Williams's short story “Hard Candy”, begun in 1949 and completed in 1953, is a variation on the narrative and themes presented in “The Mysteries of Joy Rio.”

== Critical appraisal ==
Literary critic Dennis Vannatta includes “The Miracles of Joy Rio” among the works of short fiction of Williams’ mature period “that shows the author in complete command of his powers as a short story writer.” Vannatta adds that the story “evinces masterly gifts and a unique vision.” Novelist Gore Vidal simply calls the story “wonderfully crazed.”

== Theme ==
With the emergence of Williams’ maturity as a fiction writer, and shortly before his first success as a playwright, the topic of homosexuality began to appear - implicitly yet unmistakable - in his short fiction. Literary critic Dennis Vannatta observes that “beginning with “The Mysteries of Joy Rio,” homosexuality becomes a frequent and important theme in his short stories.”

"[H]omosexuality is but one very real manifestation of a broader phenomenon in Williams’s work: the need for love and companionship and the difficulties of finding them in a world that grinds up the sensitive, the wounded, and the fugitive. This is the theme of 'The Mysteries of Joy Rio'..."—Literary critic Dennis Vannatta in Tennessee Williams: A Study of the Short Fiction (1988)

The “Joy Rio” of the story, once a miniature yet stylish grand opera house, has been converted to “a third-rate cinema” offering B movies. It is here that the focal character, Pablo Gonzalez, seeks to test the “theory” conveyed to him by his now deceased mentor and lover, Emiel Kroger:

It was his theory...that the soul becomes intolerably burdened with lies that have to be told to the world in order to be permitted to live, and that unless this burden is relieved by entire honesty with some one person, who is trusted and adored, the soul will finally collapse beneath its weight of falsity.

In his Memoirs (1975), Williams acknowledged that his treatment of homosexuality would cause “significant embarrassment” among his publishers, he declined “to dissimulate” the details of his personal life in his short fiction.

== Sources ==
- Falk, Signi. 1978. Tennessee Williams. Twayne Publishers, G. K. Hall & Co., Boston, Massachusetts. ISBN 0-8057-7202-2
- Peden, William. 1974. “Mad Pilgrimage: The Short Stories of Tennessee Williams” Studies in Short Fiction, Summer 1964 in Tennessee Williams: A Study of the Short Fiction. p. 77 Twayne Publishers, G. K. Hall & Co., Boston, Massachusetts. ISBN 0-8057-8304-0
- Vannatta, Dennis. 1988. Tennessee Williams: A Study of the Short Fiction. Twayne Publishers, G. K. Hall & Co., Boston, Massachusetts. ISBN 0-8057-8304-0
- Vidal, Gore. 1985. Introduction to Tennessee Williams: Collected Stories, New Directions Publishing, New York. pp. xix-xxv. (Originally appearing in New York Review of Books, 1985) ISBN 0-8112-0952-0
- Williams, Tennessee. 1985. Tennessee Williams: Collected Stories. New Directions Publishing, New York. pp. 99–110 ISBN 0-8112-0952-0
