= Out Cry =

- First edition (publ. New Directions, 1973)
- Written by: Tennessee Williams
- Characters: Claire; Felice
- Original language: English

Premiere
- Date premiered: July 8, 1971
- Place premiered: Ivanhoe Theatre; Chicago, Illinois

Out Cry is a play by Tennessee Williams, his rewrite of The Two-Character Play which he had written in 1966 and which was staged in 1967 and published by New Directions Publications in 1969. Williams began rewriting the play after its publication, and Out Cry premiered at the Ivanhoe Theatre in Chicago on July 8, 1971, with Eileen Herlie as Clare and Donald Madden as Felice. It debuted on Broadway at the Lyceum Theatre with a preview on February 28, 1973, and ran from March 1 to 10; the production was directed by Peter Glenville and starred Cara Duff-MacCormick as Clare and Michael York as Felice. Out Cry was published by New Directions in 1973 – by which time Williams had already rewritten the play into a third version, again titled The Two-Character Play, which New Directions published in 1975. In a 1971 interview Williams said of the first version of The Two-Character Play, "I wrote it when I was approaching a mental breakdown and rewrote it after my alleged recovery. I was thoroughly freaked out."
