= List of one-act plays by Tennessee Williams =

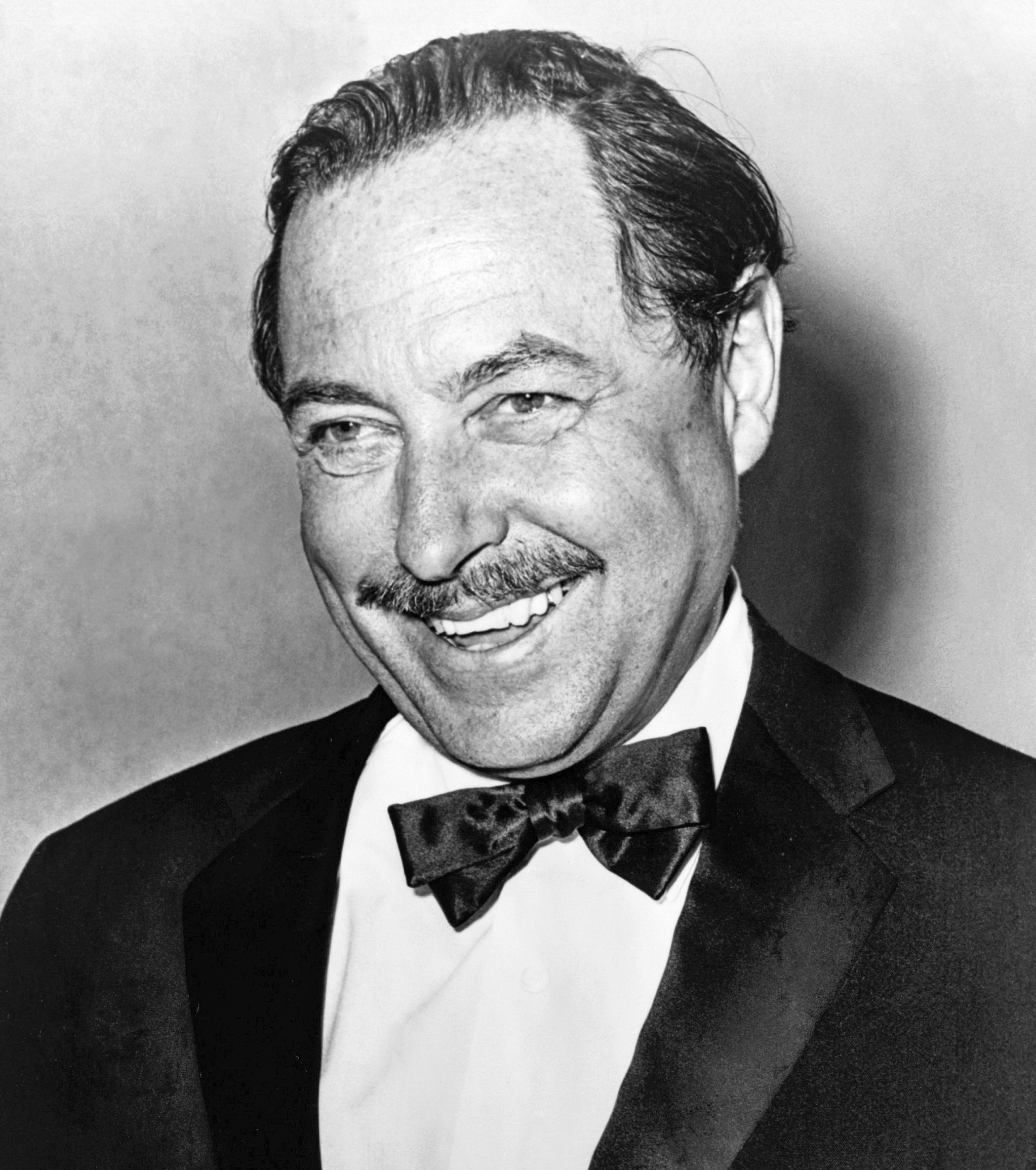
Tennessee Williams

This is a list of the one-act plays written by American playwright Tennessee Williams.

== 1930s ==
=== Beauty Is the Word ===
Beauty Is the Word is Tennessee Williams' first play. The 12-page one-act was written in 1930 while Williams was a freshman at University of Missouri in Columbia, Missouri and submitted to a contest run by the school's Dramatic Arts Club. Beauty was staged in competition and became the first freshman play ever to be selected for citation (it was awarded honorable mention); the college paper noted that it was "a play with an original and constructive idea, but the handling is too didactic and the dialog often too moralistic." The play tells the story of a South Pacific missionary, Abelard, and his wife, Mabel, and "both endorses the minister's life and corrects his tendency to Victorian prudery."

=== Why Do You Smoke So Much, Lily? ===
Why Do You Smoke So Much, Lily? was written in February 1935. In it, Lily, a frustrated chain-smoking young woman, is hounded by her mother. After being discovered in the papers left to the University of the South in Sewanee, Tennessee, "Lily" was first produced by the Chattanooga Theatre Centre (Chattanooga, TN) as part of the Fellowship of Southern Writers' Conference on Southern Literature, a biennial event that was hosted by the influential Arts and Education Council of Chattanooga.

=== Cairo! Shanghai! Bombay! ===
Cairo, Shanghai, Bombay! was Williams' first produced play. He wrote it in 1935 while he was staying in the Midtown, Memphis home of his grandparents. It was first performed July 12, 1935, by the Garden Players community theater in Memphis, Tennessee. Regarding this production, Williams wrote in his Memoirs, "The laughter, genuine and loud, at the comedy I had written enchanted me. Then and there the theatre and I found each other for better and for worse. I know it's the only thing that's saved my life." It was published for the first time in 2016, in the Tennessee Williams Annual Review.

=== The Magic Tower ===
The Magic Tower was written quickly by Williams in April 1936 in order to meet the deadline for a one-act play contest sponsored by the Webster Groves Theatre Guild in St. Louis, Missouri. Williams won first place and The Magic Tower was performed by the Guild on October 13, 1936, to positive reviews. The play tells the story of a young artist and his ex-actress wife living in a slum that they refer to as their "magic tower," following them as their optimism gradually fades.

=== Summer at the Lake ===
Written in 1937 under the title Escape, Summer at the Lake was unproduced until November 11, 2004, when it opened at the New York City Center in a collection of rarely seen Williams one-acts titled Five by Tenn. The autobiographical play tells the story of Donald Fenway, a sensitive teenager who feels trapped by his self-absorbed Southern mother and his shoe-company executive father, who wants him to abandon his plans for college and find a menial job. The play was interpreted by several critics as "an early snapshot" of the characters and themes that later appeared in Williams' breakthrough 1944 play The Glass Menagerie, which also focused on a combative mother and a dreamy son bent on escape.

=== The Palooka ===
The Palooka is a 1937 one-act about an old has-been boxer. The characters are The Palooka (Galveston Joe), The Kid and The Trainer. The Kid is nervous about his first fight, and The Palooka relieves the Kid's anxiety by telling about the fictional life he wanted to lead after he retired as Galveston Joe. Its world premiere was presented by the Chattanooga Theatre Centre (Chattanooga, TN) as part of the Fellowship of Southern Writers' Southern Writers Conference in 2000, and was later performed on October 2, 2003, by the Hartford Stage Company in Hartford, Connecticut.

=== The Fat Man's Wife ===
The Fat Man's Wife was written by Williams in 1938 but remained unproduced until November 11, 2004, when it opened at the New York City Center in a collection of rarely seen Williams one-acts titled Five by Tenn. The play tells the story of Vera Cartwright, a sophisticated Manhattan society lady who is forced to choose between her boorish husband, a theatrical producer, and a young playwright who has become her admirer. The Fat Man's Wife received the sharpest criticism of any of the five exhumed plays; in The New Yorker, John Lahr called it a "heterosexual fantasy awash with false emotion and bad writing," and The New York Times noted that "Williams is obviously attempting to write in a style entirely alien to him, trying on a faux-urbane manner that fits him like a rented tuxedo in the wrong size."

=== Adam and Eve on a Ferry ===
Adam and Eve on a Ferry was written in 1939. It contains three characters: D.H. Lawrence, his wife Frieda, and a female visitor named Ariadne. Ariadne comes seeking D.H. Lawrence because she had a run-in on a boat with a man, and wants romance and sex advice from Lawrence. The setting is described as "The sun porch of a villa in the Alps Maritimes." The only things mentioned on the stage are numerous potted plants, two wicker chairs, and "a banner bearing the woven figure of a phoenix in a nest of flames." Ariadne is described as plain and "spinsterish looking," and she wears a hat, while Lawrence sports a "gold satin dressing robe with a lavender shawl."

== 1940s ==
=== The Parade, or Approaching the End of a Summer ===
The Parade, or Approaching the End of a Summer is a short autobiographical play that was written in 1941. The Parade is set on the wharfs of Provincetown, Massachusetts, and tells the story of a young playwright named Don dealing with his unrequited homosexual love for another man. The situations and characters in the play were "clearly drawn from a very autobiographical foundation," with Don's dilemma reflecting a relationship Williams had in Provincetown with "his actual lover for [one] summer, Kip Kiernan." The Parade was written after a fight with Kiernan, and Williams reflected in 1962 that "[the version of Kip in that play] is very, in fact completely different from Kip as he was. When someone hurts us deeply, we no longer see them at all clearly. Not until time has put them back in focus." That year, Williams retitled and expanded The Parade into a full-length play that was produced in 1981 as Something Cloudy, Something Clear. The Parade was not performed until 2006, when it opened on October 1 in Provincetown as part of the First Annual Provincetown Tennessee Williams Festival by Shakespeare on the Cape. Original cast members: Ben Griessmeyer, Vanessa Caye, Elliot Eustis, Megan Bartle, David Landon. Co-Directed by Jef Hall-Flavin and Eric Powell Holm.

=== The Long Goodbye ===
The Long Goodbye is a 1940 one-act that deals with the male main character's memories of his life from when his family consisted of four people through his father leaving the family, his mother's death, and his sister's fall from grace. The scheme of the play consists of the main character moving out of the apartment he grew up in while experiencing extreme flashbacks of both terrible and glorious moments in his past.

=== Auto Da Fé ===
Auto Da Fé was written in 1941. The plot concerns a young postal worker, Eloi, whose sexuality is repressed by a rigidly moralistic mother.

=== The Lady of Larkspur Lotion ===
The Lady of Larkspur Lotion was written in 1941. It depicts the conflict between a dreamy, delusional heroine (à la Blanche DuBois in A Streetcar Named Desire) and her brusque, practical landlady, who wants to kick her out of her apartment. A 1973 summer production was staged by Producer, William T. Gardner, at the Academy Playhouse, Lake Forest, Illinois, Directed by José Quintero.

=== At Liberty ===
At Liberty was written in 1941 and tells the story of a once-successful actress who retreats to her childhood home in Mississippi, with fantasies of resuscitating her career.

=== Portrait of a Madonna ===
In January 1941, Williams completed a one-act play centering on "a deranged spinster living in poverty and with her memories of a former lover." Variously titled Port Mad and The Leafless Block, he revised the play in 1944 and renamed it Portrait of a Madonna. After seeing Jessica Tandy's performance in a 1947 West Coast production of Madonna, Williams decided to cast her in the original production of A Streetcar Named Desire. He later wrote, "It was instantly apparent to me that Jessica was Blanche [DuBois]."

=== Moony's Kid Don't Cry ===
Moony's Kid Don't Cry originated as an eight-page melodrama titled Hot Milk at Three in the Morning, which Williams wrote in 1930 at the University of Missouri. Hot Milk was produced at MU in 1932, and was revised and titled Moony's Kid Don't Cry in 1941, when it was published in Margaret Mayorga's Best One Act Plays of 1940. It was the first of Williams' plays to be published. In both versions of the play, a poor young married couple get into an argument over their child and, eventually, their relationship.

=== The Strangest Kind of Romance ===
The Strangest Kind of Romance was written in 1942. The play takes place in a boardinghouse run by the Landlady, who welcomes a new, but troubled, tenant known only as "Little Man". He develops a strange attachment to a cat named Nitchevo, the pet of the previous tenant.

=== The Purification ===
The Purification is the only verse play Tennessee Williams wrote; Williams recalled that it was written in the summer of 1940, although his biographer Lyle Leverich thought it more likely written in spring 1942. It was published in 1944 in the anthology New Directions 1944 under the title Dos Ranchos, or the Purification (in later publications, this was shortened to The Purification). Set on a ranch in the mid-19th century, the play deals with an incestuous brother/sister relationship and a murder trial. The Purification had its New York debut off-Broadway at the Theatre de Lys on December 8, 1959.

=== Ten Blocks on the Camino Real ===
Ten Blocks on the Camino Real is a one-act play that was written in early 1946 and published in Williams' 1948 play collection American Blues; in 1952, the playwright expanded it into a full-length play, Camino Real. Williams directs the reader to use the Anglicized pronunciation "Cá-mino Réal"

=== This Property Is Condemned ===
This one-act play was written in 1946. In 1966, the play was expanded into the film of the same name, which starred Natalie Wood and Robert Redford.

=== 27 Wagons Full of Cotton ===
27 Wagons Full of Cotton is a 1946 one-act play that Williams referred to as "a Mississippi Delta comedy." Jake, a middle-aged, shady cotton gin owner with antiquated equipment burns down the mill of the Syndicate Plantation, a rival in the cotton business, where Silva Vicarro serves as Superintendent. Being of Latin descent, with an Italian surname, and thus a community outsider, Vicarro, who knows what happened but cannot prove it, seeks revenge by raping Jake's young and voluptuous but childlike and naïve wife Flora. Elia Kazan's controversial 1956 film Baby Doll, which Williams described as a "grotesque folk comedy", was based on this play and The Unsatisfactory Supper, which has two similar main characters. The name and character of Silva Vicarro is used in Baby Doll.

=== The Long Stay Cut Short, or The Unsatisfactory Supper ===
This play was first copyrighted in 1946. Archie Lee and his Baby Doll Meighan, who parallel Jake and Flora in 27 Wagons Full of Cotton, are reluctantly providing a home to Aunt Rose, an elderly relation who has been passed around among the family. An "unsatisfactory supper" cooked by Aunt Rose brings the issue to a head. Rose was the name of Tennessee Williams' sister.

Elia Kazan's controversial 1956 film Baby Doll was based on this play and 27 Wagons Full of Cotton, which has two similar main characters; the names Archie Lee and Baby Doll are used for the main characters in Baby Doll.

=== The Last of My Solid Gold Watches ===
The Last of My Solid Gold Watches was written in 1946, and centers on a Mississippi shoe salesman named Charlie Colton "whose time has passed and who pathetically echoes himself"; Williams is thought to have drawn on aspects of his father, a traveling salesman, in his portrait of Colton.

=== Hello from Bertha ===
Hello from Bertha is a 1946 one-act, about the dramatic life and death of a prostitute in a low-class bordello. It is very strong and very poetic as Bertha imagines events and allusions to her last moments. There are three characters in the play: Lena, a young prostitute who listens to Bertha, and Goldie the old lady of the house who wants to evict Bertha. A production was staged by Producer, William T. Gardner, in the summer of 1973 at the Academy Playhouse, Lake Forest, Illinois Directed by José Quintero

=== Lord Byron's Love Letter ===
Written in 1946, Lord Byron's Love Letter takes place in New Orleans in the late 19th century during Mardi Gras. A Spinster and an Old Woman advertise that they have one of Lord Byron's love letters (written to her grandmother). A Matron stops by to look at it and drags her partially inebriated Husband along. As the spinster reads from her grandmother's diary, it becomes apparent that the grandmother and the old woman are one and the same. According to the two women, the grandmother met Lord Byron in Greece, shortly before his death, and they had a summer filled with romance. After he died, the grandmother retired from the world and remained in complete seclusion as an honor to his memory (this does not prevent her from commenting on the spinster's every action). They only gave permission to The Matron and her Husband to see the letter from a distance and they refused to show this letter from near.

== 1950s ==
=== I Rise in Flame, Cried the Phoenix ===
I Rise in Flame, Cried the Phoenix presents a fictionalized version of the death of English writer D. H. Lawrence on the French Riveria; Lawrence was one of Williams' chief literary influences. The play was completed in 1941, but was not published until 1951, when New Directions Publishers released it in a limited edition.

=== Talk to Me Like the Rain and Let Me Listen ===
Talk to Me Like the Rain and Let Me Listen was written in 1953 as part of a series of one-acts Williams wrote in particular for community theatre. Unlike the large scenic demands of his larger works (i.e. A Streetcar Named Desire) Talk Like The Rain... features a small-scale, bare-room situation. It involves an unnamed Man and Woman who are bound together in an endless cycle by their hopeless poverty. Major William's themes are explored in the Man's alcoholism and the Woman's desperation. Although not specified, the one-act can be worked in a more surrealist fashion. Monologues for both sexes, with the Woman's being substantially longer, spanning several pages.

=== The Dark Room ===
The Dark Room was written in c. 1939, and published in 1958.

=== The Case of the Crushed Petunias ===
The Case of the Crushed Petunias was written in 1941 and is the story of Dorothy Simple, a woman trapped in her job at a prim and proper shop in Massachusetts. Her complacent existence is interrupted by a visit from a tall man who works for LIFE Inc. who, she discovers, trampled her petunias the night before. With offers of poetry and packets of seeds, he helps her break free from her dreary life.

=== A Perfect Analysis Given by a Parrot ===
A Perfect Analysis Given by a Parrot was written in 1958.

=== Suddenly Last Summer ===
Suddenly Last Summer was written in New York in 1957 and debuted as part of a double bill of one-act plays by Williams, titled Garden District. (The other one-act play was Something Unspoken.) Garden District premiered Off-Broadway at the York Playhouse on January 7, 1958.

=== Something Unspoken ===
Something Unspoken was written in London in 1951 and debuted as part of a double bill of one-act plays by Williams, titled Garden District. (The other one-act was Suddenly Last Summer.) Garden District premiered Off-Broadway at the York Playhouse on January 7, 1958. The title Garden District is a misnomer, because while Suddenly Last Summer takes place in the Garden District of New Orleans, Something Unspoken takes place in Meridian, Louisiana.

=== And Tell Sad Stories of the Deaths of Queens ... ===
And Tell Sad Stories of the Deaths of Queens ... (A Play in Two Scenes) was initially written in 1957 and worked on as late as 1962. It was published in 2005 by New Directions in Mister Paradise and Other One-Act Plays (NDP1007). A slightly different version was first published in Political Stages: Plays That Shaped a Century (Applause Theatre & Cinema Books, 2002). The play concerns the private life of "Candy" Delaney, a successful interior decorator and landlord who is also transgender. It was first performed by the Shakespeare Theatre Company on April 22, 2004, at the Kennedy Center in Washington, D.C.

== 1960s ==
=== Slapstick Tragedy ===
==== The Mutilated ====
The Mutilated was written in 1966, and debuted as part of a double-bill of one-act plays written by Williams titled Slapstick Tragedy (the other one-act was The Gnädiges Fräulein.) Slapstick Tragedy premiered on Broadway at the Longacre Theatre on February 22, 1966. For acting in the two halves of Slapstick Tragedy, Zoe Caldwell won the first of her four Tony Awards.

==== The Gnädiges Fräulein ====
The Gnädiges Fräulein was written in 1966, and debuted as part of a double-bill of one-act plays written by Williams titled Slapstick Tragedy (the other one-act was The Mutilated.) Slapstick Tragedy premiered on Broadway at the Longacre Theatre on February 22, 1966.

=== Confessional ===
Confessional was written in 1967 and published in 1969 in the Williams anthology Dragon Country. It is set in a seedy bar in Southern California and centers on the confessions of four of its habitués of the bar. The staging creates the sense that the characters are confessing privately to the audience rather than to each other. The play premiered in July 1971 at the Maine Theatre Arts Festival in Bar Harbor in a double bill with Williams's I Can't Imagine Tomorrow. Williams later expanded Confessional to a two-act play Small Craft Warnings which premiered in 1972. Confessional was revived in 2016 for its British premiere at London's Southwark Playhouse.

=== Now the Cats with Jewelled Claws ===
Now the Cats with Jewelled Claws was written in 1969. Set in the anteroom of Hell, it was described by Williams biographer Donald Spoto as "gruesome....a tale of madness, depravity and death."

== 1970s ==
=== I Can't Imagine Tomorrow ===
I Can't Imagine Tomorrow was a two-character play written for television, broadcast with Talk To Me Like The Rain And Let Me Listen under the collective title "Dragon Country" on WNET-TV in 1970. Kim Stanley plays a lonely but spirited spinster being courted by a pathologically shy teacher, played by William Redfield. "Dragon Country" is available on DVD as part of the Broadway Theatre Archive.

=== The Frosted Glass Coffin ===
Written in 1970, The Frosted Glass Coffin follows a group of retirees living at a hotel in Miami, Florida. In his memoirs, Williams wrote that he believed the "rather depressing" work to be "one of [his] best short plays."

=== The Demolition Downtown ===
The Demolition Downtown was written in 1970.

=== A Cavalier for Milady ===
A Cavalier for Milady is a two-act play written in 1976.

=== A Lovely Sunday for Creve Coeur ===
Written in 1976, A Lovely Sunday for Creve Coeur introduces Bodey, a hard-of-hearing 50-something, sharing her flat with Dorothea, 'Dottie', a Blanche DuBois-like 40-something civics teacher, smitten with the social-climbing principal of the school where she works, having already been taken advantage in the back seat of his car.

=== Kirche, Küche und Kinder ===
Kirche, Küche und Kinder was written in 1979. The title translates as "Church, Kitchen and Children" and is a reference to a well-known German slogan. It was first performed by The Jean Cocteau Repertory Company as a work-in-progress in September, 1979, at the Bouwerie Lane Theatre in New York City, where it ran in repertory until January, 1980. The play is subtitled (An Outrage for the Stage). It was published in 2008 by New Directions in The Traveling Companion & Other Plays (NDP1106).

=== Lifeboat Drill ===
Lifeboat Drill was written in 1979. On January 26, 2002, June Havoc and Dick Cavett starred in a production of the play as part of the fourth annual Tennessee Williams marathon at the Hartford Stage Company.

== 1980s one-acts ==
=== The Chalky White Substance ===
The Chalky White Substance was written in 1980. It was originally published in issue 66 of Antaeus in 1991. It was first performed by the Running Sun Theater Company on May 3, 1996, at the Center Stage (New York) in New York City on a double-bill with The Traveling Companion, collectively entitled Williams' Guignol. The play is dedicated to author James Purdy.

=== This Is Peaceable Kingdom or Good Luck God ===
This Is Peaceable Kingdom or Good Luck God was written in 1980.

=== Steps Must be Gentle ===
Steps Must be Gentle was written in 1980.

=== The One Exception ===
The One Exception was written in 1983. It was originally published in The Tennessee Williams Annual Review, Volume 3, in 2000. It was first performed on October 2, 2003, by the Hartford Stage Company of Hartford, Connecticut.

== One-act publication history ==
- 27 Wagons Full of Cotton (New Directions Publishers, February 1946, first edition; NDP217)
  - Collects 27 Wagons Full of Cotton; The Lady of Larkspur Lotion; The Last of My Solid Gold Watches; Portrait of a Madonna; Auto Da Fé; Lord Byron's Love Letter; This Property Is Condemned; The Long Goodbye; At Liberty; Moony's Kid Don't Cry; The Strangest Kind of Romance; Hello from Bertha; and The Purification.
- American Blues: Five Short Plays (Dramatists Play Service, 1948)
  - Collects The Dark Room; Ten Blocks on the Camino Real; The Case of the Crushed Petunias; The Unsatisfactory Supper; and Moony's Kid Don't Cry.
- Dragon Country: A Book of Plays (New Directions Publishers, 1970; NDP287)
  - Collects (along with the full-length play In the Bar of a Tokyo Hotel) I Rise in Flame, Cried the Phoenix; The Mutilated; I Can't Imagine Tomorrow; Confessional; The Frosted Glass Coffin; The Gnädiges Fräulein; and A Perfect Analysis Given by a Parrot.
- Tennessee Williams, Plays 1937-1955 (Library of America, 2000; #119)
  - Collects (along with his full-length plays) 27 Wagons Full of Cotton; The Lady of Larkspur Lotion; The Last of My Solid Gold Watches; Portrait of a Madonna; Auto Da Fé; Lord Byron's Love Letter; This Property Is Condemned; Talk to Me Like the Rain and Let Me Listen; and Something Unspoken.
- Tennessee Williams, Plays 1957-1980 (Library of America, 2000; #120)
  - Collects (along with his full-length plays) Suddenly, Last Summer and The Mutilated.
- Mister Paradise and Other One-Act Plays (New Directions Publishers, 2005; NDP1007)
  - Collects These Are the Stairs You Got to Watch; Mister Paradise; The Palooka; Escape; Why Do You Smoke So Much, Lily?; Summer at the Lake; The Big Game; The Pink Bedroom; The Fat Man's Wife; Thank You, Kind Spirit; The Municipal Abattoir; Adam and Eve on a Ferry; and And Tell Sad Stories of the Deaths of Queens.
- The Traveling Companion & Other Plays (New Directions Publishers, 2008; NDP1106)
  - Collects (along with the full-length play Will Mr. Merriweather Return from Memphis?) The Chalky White Substance; The Day on Which a Man Dies; A Cavalier for Milady; The Pronoun "I"; The Remarkable Rooming-House of Mme. LeMonde; Kirche, Küche, Kinder; Green Eyes; The Parade; The One Exception; Sunburst; and The Traveling Companion.
- Camino Real (New Directions Publishers, 2008; NDP1122)
  - Collects (along with the full-length play Camino Real) Ten Blocks on the Camino Real.
- Sweet Bird of Youth (New Directions Publishers, 2008; NDP1123)
  - Collects (along with the full-length play Sweet Bird of Youth) The Enemy: Time.
- The Rose Tattoo (New Directions Publishers, 2010; NDP1172)
  - Collects (along with the full-length play The Rose Tattoo) The Dog Enchanted by the Divine View.
- The Magic Tower and Other One-Act Plays (New Directions Publishers, 2011; NDP1182)
  - Collects At Liberty; The Magic Tower; Mr. Vashya; Curtains for the Gentleman; In Our Profession; Every Twenty Minutes; Honor the Living; The Case of the Crushed Petunias; The Pretty Trap; Some Problems for the Moose Lodge; Interior: Panic; Mooney's Kid Don't Cry; Kingdom of Earth; I Never Get Dressed Till After Dark on Sundays; and The Dark Room.
- The Glass Menagerie - Deluxe Centennial Edition (New Directions Publishers, 2011; NDP)
  - Collects (along with the full-length play The Glass Menagerie) The Pretty Trap.
- Orpheus Descending and Suddenly, Last Summer (New Directions Publishers, 2012; Release date: November 29, 2012)
