= Michael Weller =

American screenwriter

- Born: September 26, 1942 (age 84); New York City, New York, U.S.
- Occupation: Playwright
- Years active: 1971 to present
- Notable work: Moonchildren, Ragtime, Hair

Michael Weller (born September 26, 1942) is a Brooklyn-based playwright and screen writer. His plays include Moonchildren, Loose Ends, Spoils of War and Fifty Words. His screenplays include Ragtime, for which he was nominated for an Oscar, and Hair, both directed by Miloš Forman.

== Early life and studies ==
Weller was born in New York City, and has lived in Nevada, Massachusetts, London and New York. He attended Stockbridge School and studied music composition at Brandeis University in Massachusetts. In the late 1960s at Manchester University, he studied playwriting with Stephen Joseph (the child of actress Hermione Gingold and the publisher Michael Joseph) and received a Diploma in Drama. He then moved to London to write plays.

== Career ==
The director Alan Schneider, who was an early collaborator with the playwrights Samuel Beckett and Edward Albee, saw a London run-through of Weller's play Moonchildren, and brought it to the Arena Stage in Washington then to Broadway. Moonchildren subsequently had an acclaimed run off-Broadway at the Theatre de Lys in 1973 and 1974. Schneider also staged Weller's play Loose Ends at the Arena Stage then on Broadway at Circle in the Square Theatre.

His play Spoils of War was adapted as a screenplay and became the TV film In Spite of Love. Kate Nelligan played the part of Elise in both.

In 2017 Brandeis University honored Weller with the university's Brandeis Creative Arts Award. The university invited him to write a new play and suggested it might explore issues regarding freedom of speech. The university had recently received the papers of the social-satirist and stand-up comedian Lenny Bruce. Weller researched the library's collection of the Bruce papers, and began to write his play Buyer Beware, a play that poses the question: If Lenny Bruce were to come back, and book a gig on a campus of today, what would happen?

He is described as writing with insight and objectivity about characters who came of age in the time of the war in Vietnam, and he has also written plays that are more personal and deal with matters of the heart.

Weller has been active in the Dramatists Guild of America, battling for the rights of playwrights. He has served as President of the Writers Guild Initiative from 2011 to 2018.

== Teaching and mentoring ==
Weller is one of the founders of the Cherry Lane Theatre's acclaimed Mentor Project, which pairs pre-eminent playwrights with emerging playwrights for a season-long mentorship. In 2005, the Broken Watch Theatre Company in New York named its performance space the Michael Weller Theatre "in honor of his tremendous accomplishments". The theater closed in 2008.

Weller was a faculty member at The New School for Drama in New York City until 2020.

== Plays ==
- The Bodybuilders (1969) Open Space, London
- Tira Tells Everything There is to Know About Herself (1969) Open Space, London
- Moonchildren (1971)
- More Than You Deserve (musical with Jim Steinman - 1973)
- Fishing (1974)
- Split (1979)
- Loose Ends (1979)
- Dwarfman, Master of a Million Shapes (1982)
- The Ballad of Soapy Smith (1984) About infamous con man Soapy Smith
- Ghost on Fire (1986)
- Spoils of War (1988)
- Lake No Bottom (1989)
- Buying Time (1991)
- Help (1992/2006)
- Dogbrain (play for children - 1993)
- Mistresses (1997)
- What the Night is For / Do Not Disturb (2002)
- Approaching Moomtaj (2005)
- Doctor Zhivago (musical) (with Lucy Simon - 2006/2011/2015)
- 50 Words (2007/2007)
- Side Effects (2011)
- Beast (2008)
- How to Write Play So Not Getting Fingers Broken (2011, Broken Watch Theatre Company) - part of double bill Sex Good, Money Bad - with Now There's Just the Three of Us
- The Full Catastrophe CATF (2015)
- Abel Finley (2014)
- Jericho (from Liliom by Ferenc Molnár) (2014 / produced 2018 Attic Theatre Company)
- Summer (2016) LP
- All That Remains (2017)
- A Late Morning (in America) with Ronald Reagan (2018 - Contemporary American Theatre Festival - CATF)
- A Welcome Guest ("Toppledon") (2019) - CATF
- Buyer Beware ("Standup") (2017–2019) - Vicious Circle Productions/Tony Speciale
- Two Nights One Year (2021/23)
- Halfway There (2024)
- "The Nature in Things" [2 One Act Plays: Remember the Dinosaur & "Snow Check] (2025)
- "Longing" Vicious Circle Productions (2025)
- "thenandnow" (2026)

== Screenplays ==
- Once and Again (1999) – television
- Spoils of War (1994) – play/teleplay
- Lost Angels (1989)
- Ragtime (1981)
- Hair (1979)
