= Will Mr. Merriweather Return from Memphis? =

1980 play by Tennessee Williams

Will Mr. Merriwether Return from Memphis?
- Original language: English
- Written by: Tennessee Williams
- Genre: short play

Premiere
- Date: 24 January 1980
- Place: Tennessee Williams Performing Arts Center

Will Mr. Merriwether Return from Memphis? is a short play by Tennessee Williams, premiering on 24 January 1980 at the Tennessee Williams Performing Arts Center, Key West, Florida.

Although the play was written but unpublished in 1969, it was not staged until January 1980, when the Tennessee Williams Fine Arts Center, situated on the campus of Florida Keys Community College, presented it as their opening production. It is included in The Traveling Companion and Other Plays, a collection of experimental plays by Williams, published by New Directions in 2008 in New York.
