= David Schweizer =

American theatre director (1949/1950–2024)

- Born: 1949 or 1950; United States
- Died: December 4, 2024 (aged 74); United States
- Occupation: Theatre director
- Website: davidschweizer.com

David Schweizer (1949 or 1950 – December 5, 2024) was an American theatre director.

Schweizer died on December 5, 2024, at the age of 74.
