= Tennessee Williams =

American playwright (1911–1983)

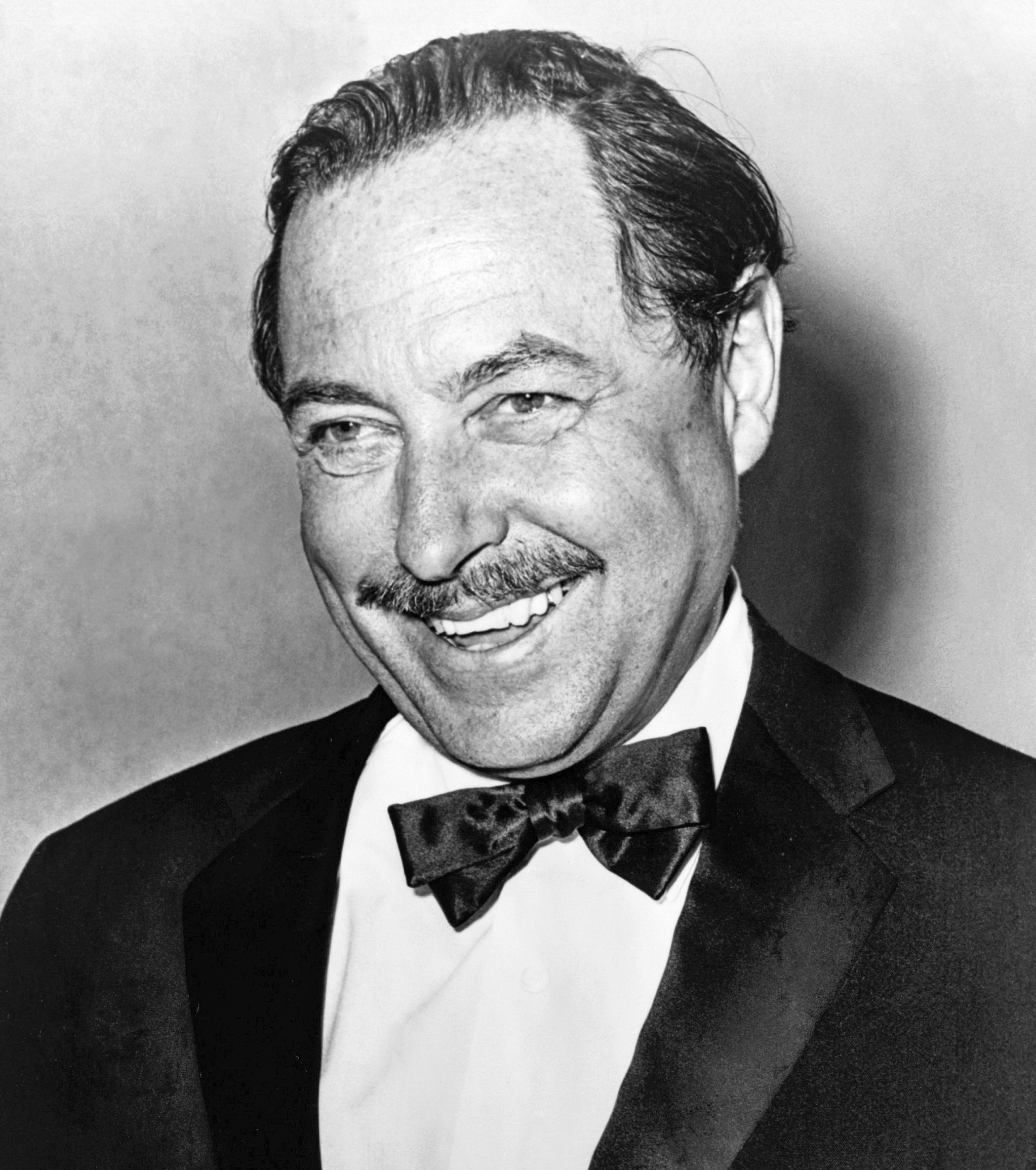
- Williams in 1965
- Born: Thomas Lanier Williams III; March 26, 1911; Columbus, Mississippi, U.S.
- Died: February 25, 1983 (aged 71); New York City, U.S.
- Resting place: Calvary Cemetery
- Education: University of Missouri; Washington University; University of Iowa (BA)
- Occupations: Playwright; screenwriter
- Years active: 1930–1983

Thomas Lanier "Tennessee" Williams III (March 26, 1911 – February 25, 1983) was an American playwright and screenwriter. Along with contemporaries Eugene O'Neill and Arthur Miller, he is considered among the three foremost playwrights of 20th-century American drama.

Williams wrote his first play in 1930, but his work did not gain much traction until 1944 with the success of The Glass Menagerie. His next plays, including A Streetcar Named Desire (1947), Cat on a Hot Tin Roof (1955), Sweet Bird of Youth (1959), and The Night of the Iguana (1961), were also successful and widely acclaimed. With his later work, Williams attempted a new style that did not appeal as widely to audiences. His drama A Streetcar Named Desire is often numbered on short lists of the finest American plays of the 20th century alongside Eugene O'Neill's Long Day's Journey into Night and Arthur Miller's Death of a Salesman.

Much of Williams's work was adapted to film. He also wrote short stories, poetry, essays, and a volume of memoirs. In 1979, four years before his death, Williams was inducted into the American Theater Hall of Fame.

== Early life ==
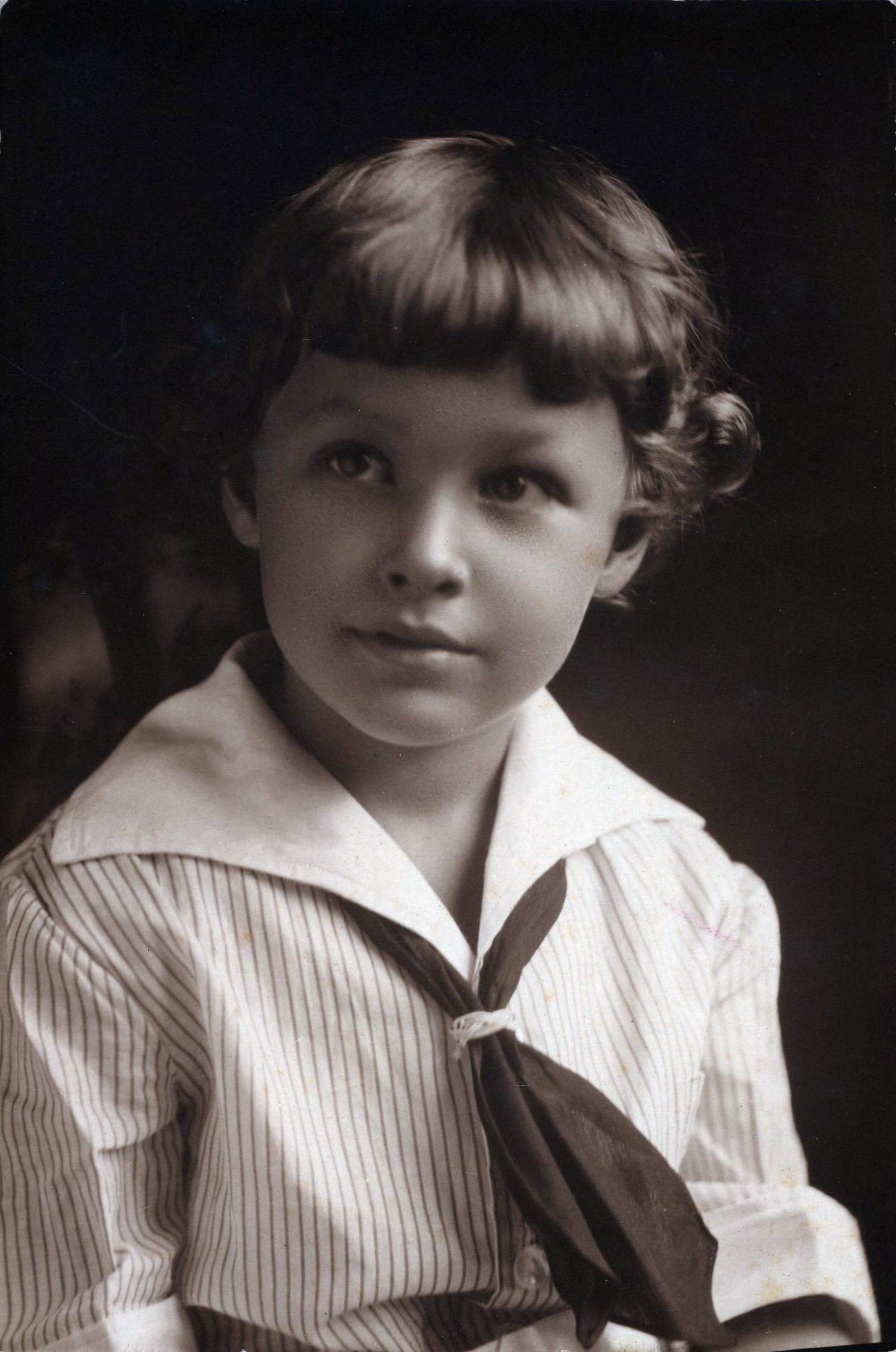
Williams at age 5 (1916) in Clarksdale, Mississippi

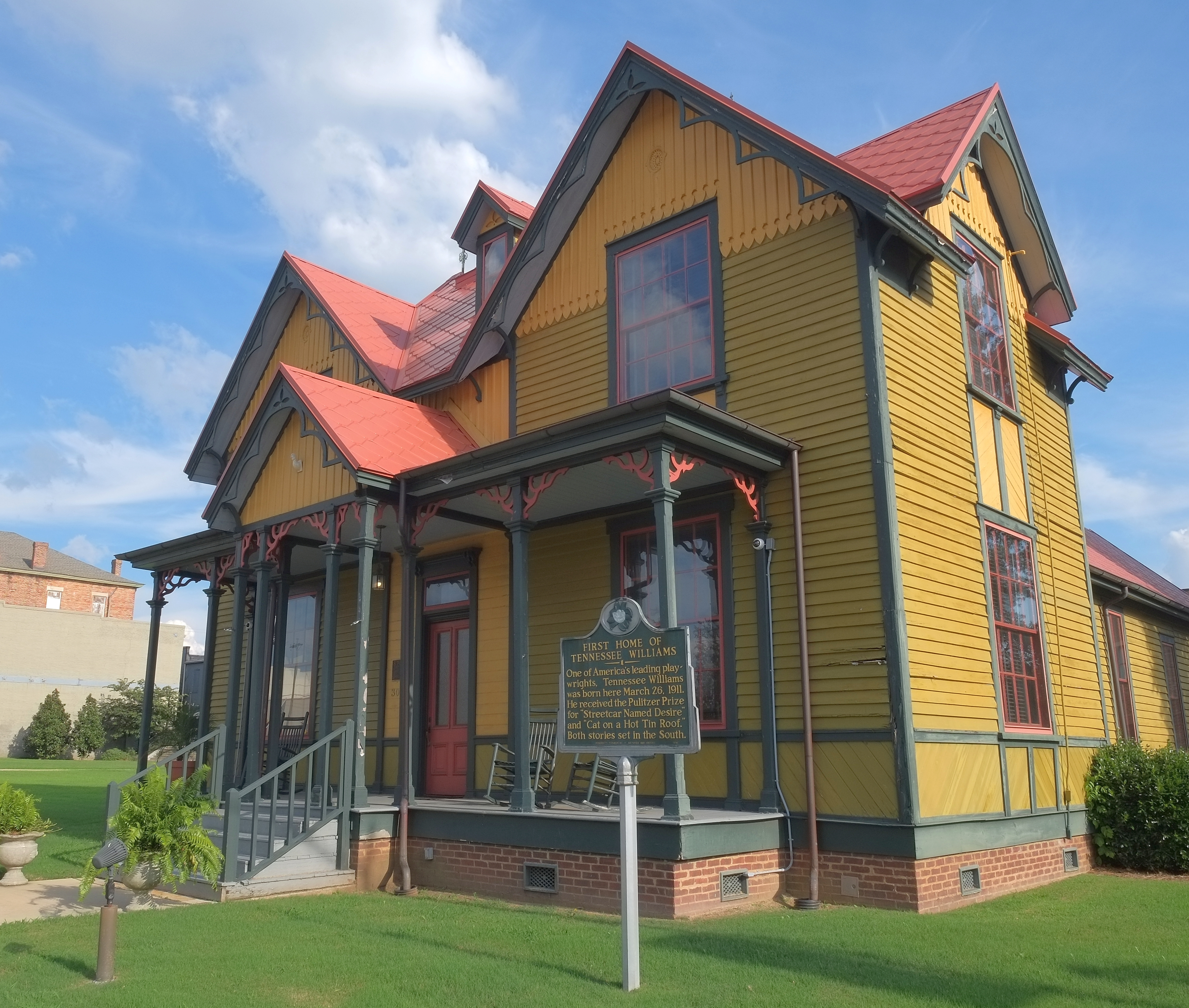
Childhood Home in Columbus, Mississippi

Thomas Lanier Williams III was born in Columbus, Mississippi, of English, Welsh, and Huguenot ancestry, the second child of Edwina Dakin (August 9, 1884 – June 1, 1980) and Cornelius Coffin "C. C." Williams (1879–1957). His father was a traveling shoe salesman who became an alcoholic and was frequently away from home. His mother was the daughter of Rose O. Dakin, a music teacher, and the Reverend Walter Dakin, an Episcopal priest from Illinois who was assigned to a parish in Clarksdale, Mississippi, shortly after Williams's birth. Williams lived in his grandfather's Episcopal rectory with his family for much of his early childhood and was close to his grandparents.

He had two siblings, older sister Rose Isabel Williams (1909–1996) and younger brother Walter Dakin Williams (1919–2008). As a young child, Williams nearly died from a case of diphtheria that left him frail, short and virtually confined to his house during a year of recuperation. At least partly due to his illness, he was considered a weak child by his father, Cornelius Williams, a descendant of East Tennessee pioneers, had a violent temper and was prone to use his fists. He regarded what he thought was his son's effeminacy with disdain. Edwina, locked in an unhappy marriage, focused her attention almost entirely on her frail young son. Critics and historians agree that Williams drew from his own dysfunctional family in much of his writing and that his desire to break free from his puritan upbringing propelled him toward writing.

When Williams was eight years old, his father was promoted to a job at the home office of the International Shoe Company in St. Louis. His mother's continual search for a more appropriate home, as well as his father's heavy drinking and loudly turbulent behavior, caused them to move numerous times around St. Louis. Williams attended Soldan High School, a setting he referred to in his play The Glass Menagerie. Later he studied at University City High School. At age 16, Williams won third prize for an essay published in Smart Set, titled "Can a Good Wife Be a Good Sport?" A year later, his short story "The Vengeance of Nitocris" was published (as by "Thomas Lanier Williams") in the August 1928 issue of the magazine Weird Tales. These early publications did not lead to any significant recognition or appreciation of Williams's talent, and he would struggle for more than a decade to establish his writing career. Later, in 1928, Williams first visited Europe with his maternal grandfather Dakin.

== Education ==
From 1929 to 1931, Williams attended the College of Arts & Sciences at the University of Missouri in Columbia, where he enrolled in journalism classes. He was bored by his classes and distracted by unrequited love for a girl. Soon he began entering his poetry, essays, stories, and plays in writing contests, hoping to earn extra income. His first submitted play was Beauty Is the Word (1930), followed by Hot Milk at Three in the Morning (1932). As recognition for Beauty, a play about rebellion against religious upbringing, he became the first freshman to receive honorable mention in a writing competition.

At University of Missouri, Williams joined the Alpha Tau Omega fraternity, but he did not fit in well with his fraternity brothers. After he failed a military training course in his junior year, his father pulled him out of school and put him to work at the International Shoe Company factory. Although Williams hated the monotony, the job forced him out of the gentility of his upbringing. His dislike of his new 9-to-5 routine drove Williams to write prodigiously. He set a goal of writing one story a week. Williams often worked on weekends and late into the night. His mother recalled his intensity:

Tom would go to his room with black coffee and cigarettes and I would hear the typewriter clicking away at night in the silent house. Some mornings when I walked in to wake him for work, I would find him sprawled fully dressed across the bed, too tired to remove his clothes.

Overworked, unhappy, and lacking further success with his writing, by his 24th birthday Williams had suffered a nervous breakdown and left his job. Memories of this period and of a particular factory co-worker would contribute to the character Stanley Kowalski in A Streetcar Named Desire. By the mid-1930s his mother separated from his father due to his worsening alcoholism and abusive temper. They agreed to a legal separation in 1946 but never divorced.

In 1936, Williams enrolled at Washington University in St. Louis where he wrote the play Me, Vashya (1937). After not winning the school's poetry prize, he decided to drop out. In the autumn of 1937, he transferred to the University of Iowa in Iowa City, where he graduated with a B.A. in English in August 1938. He later studied at the Dramatic Workshop of The New School in New York City. About his early days as a playwright and an early collaborative play called Cairo, Shanghai, Bombay!, Williams wrote, "The laughter ... enchanted me. Then and there the theatre and I found each other for better and for worse. I know it's the only thing that saved my life." Around 1939, he adopted Tennessee Williams as his professional name in acknowledgement of his Southern accent and roots.

=== Literary influences ===
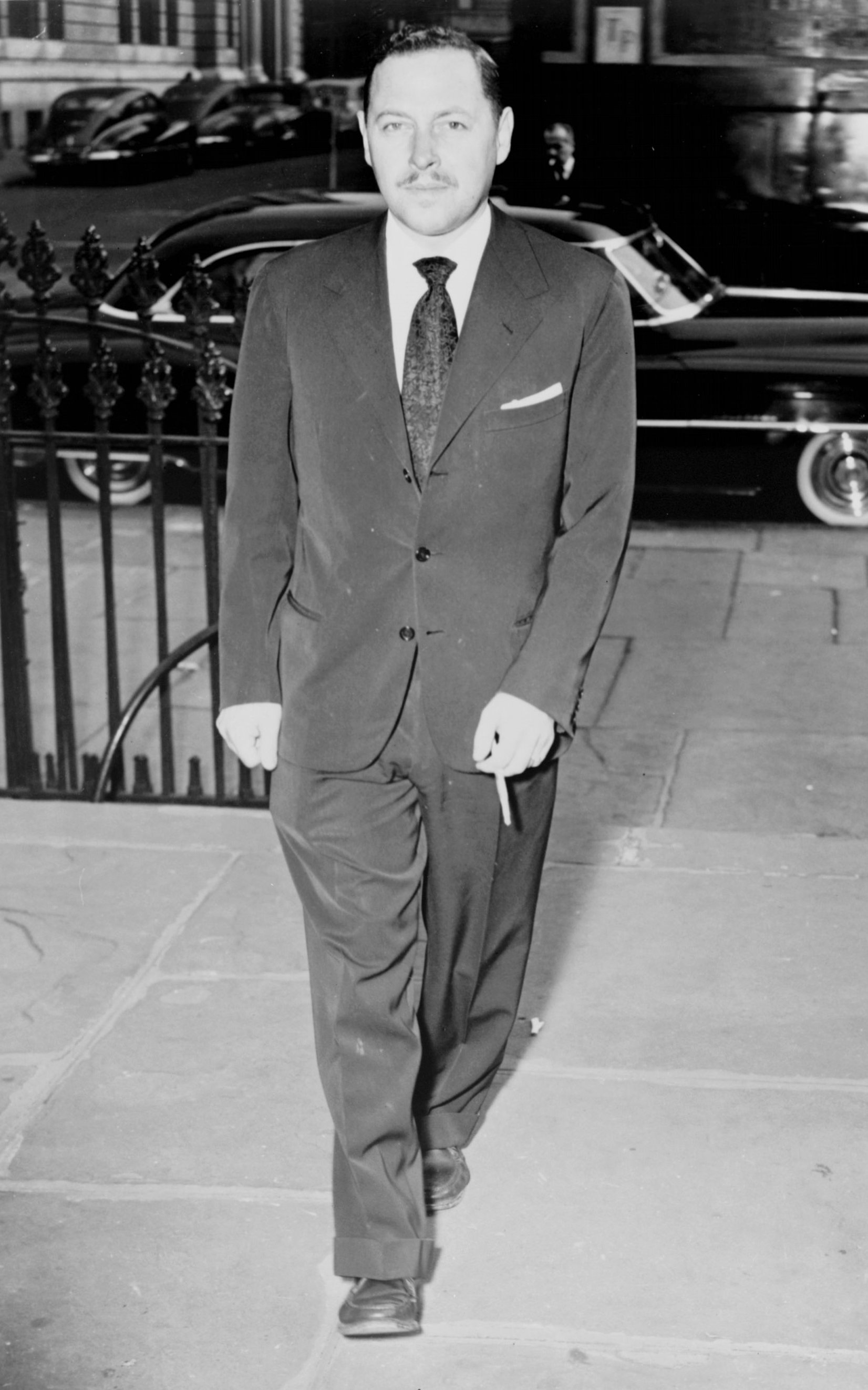
Williams arriving at funeral services for Dylan Thomas in 1953

Williams's writings reference some of the poets and writers he most admired in his early years: Hart Crane, Arthur Rimbaud, Anton Chekhov, William Shakespeare, Clarence Darrow, D. H. Lawrence, Katherine Mansfield, August Strindberg, William Faulkner, Thomas Wolfe, Emily Dickinson, William Inge, James Joyce, and, according to some, Ernest Hemingway.

== Career ==
In the late 1930s, while struggling to gain production and an audience for his work, Williams worked at a string of menial jobs that included a stint as caretaker on a chicken ranch in Laguna Beach, California.

In 1939, with the help of his agent Audrey Wood, Williams was awarded a $1,000 grant (equivalent to $23,100 in 2025) from the Rockefeller Foundation in recognition of his play Battle of Angels. It was produced in Boston, Massachusetts in 1940 and was poorly received.

In 1939, using some of the Rockefeller funds, Williams moved to New Orleans to write for the Works Progress Administration (WPA), a federally funded program of the New Deal era. Williams lived for a time in the New Orleans French Quarter, including 722 Toulouse Street, the setting of his future play Vieux Carré (1977). The building is now part of The Historic New Orleans Collection.

The Rockefeller grant brought him to the attention of the Hollywood film industry, and Williams received a six-month contract as a writer from the Metro-Goldwyn-Mayer film studio, earning US$250 weekly (equivalent to $5,800 in 2025).

During the winter of 1944–45, Williams' memory play The Glass Menagerie, developed from his short story "Portrait of a Girl in Glass" (1943), was produced in Chicago and garnered good reviews. It moved to New York where it became an instant hit and enjoyed a long Broadway run. Elia Kazan (who directed many of Williams's greatest successes) said of Williams: "Everything in his life is in his plays, and everything in his plays is in his life." The Glass Menagerie won the award for the best play of the season, the New York Drama Critics' Circle Award.

In 1947, the huge success of Williams' next play, A Streetcar Named Desire, cemented his reputation as a great playwright.

During the late 1940s and 1950s, Williams began to travel widely with his partner Frank Merlo (1922–1963), often spending summers in Europe. He moved often to stimulate his writing, living in New York, New Orleans, Key West, Rome, Barcelona, and London. Williams wrote: "Only some radical change can divert the downward course of my spirit, some startling new place or people to arrest the drift, the drag."

Between 1948 and 1959, Williams had seven of his plays produced on Broadway: Summer and Smoke (1948); The Rose Tattoo (1951); Camino Real (1953); Cat on a Hot Tin Roof (1955); Orpheus Descending (1957); Garden District (1958); and Sweet Bird of Youth (1959).

In the early 1950s, Williams' work reached wider audiences when The Glass Menagerie (1950) and A Streetcar Named Desire (1951) were adapted into motion pictures.

By 1959, Williams had earned two Pulitzer Prizes, three New York Drama Critics' Circle Awards, three Donaldson Awards, and a Tony Award.

In the late 1950s and early 1960s, other plays also adapted for the screen included The Rose Tattoo (1955), Cat on a Hot Tin Roof (1958), Orpheus Descending (1960), Summer and Smoke (1961), Sweet Bird of Youth (1962), and The Night of the Iguana (1964).

In the 1960s and 1970s, after the extraordinary successes of the 1940s and 1950s, Williams experienced personal turmoil and theatrical failures. Although he continued to write every day, the quality of his work suffered from his increasing alcohol and drug consumption, as well as occasional poor choices of collaborators.

Consumed by depression, and in and out of treatment facilities while under the control of his mother and brother Dakin, Williams spiraled downward. His plays Kingdom of Earth (1967), In the Bar of a Tokyo Hotel (1969), Small Craft Warnings (1973), The Two Character Play (also called Out Cry) (1973), The Red Devil Battery Sign (1976), Vieux Carré (1978), Clothes for a Summer Hotel (1980), and others were all box office failures. Negative press notices wore down his spirit.

In 1974, Williams received the St. Louis Literary Award from the Saint Louis University Library Associates.

In 1976, Williams served as the president of the jury for the 29th Cannes Film Festival.

In 1979, four years before his death, Williams was inducted into the American Theater Hall of Fame.

In 1982, Williams' last play, A House Not Meant to Stand, was produced in Chicago. Despite largely positive reviews, it ran for only 40 performances.

== Personal life ==
Throughout his life, Williams remained close to his sister, Rose, who was diagnosed with schizophrenia as a young woman. In 1943, as her behavior became increasingly disturbing, she was subjected to a lobotomy, requiring her to be institutionalized for the rest of her life. As soon as he was financially able, Williams moved Rose to a private institution just north of New York City, where he often visited her. He gave her a percentage interest in several of his most successful plays, the royalties of which were applied toward her care. The devastating effects of Rose's treatment may have contributed to Williams's alcoholism and his dependence on various combinations of amphetamines and barbiturates.

Williams was acknowledged to have been gay. After some early attempts at relationships with women, by the late 1930s, Williams began exploring his homosexuality. In New York City, he joined a gay social circle that included fellow writer and close friend Donald Windham (1920–2010) and Windham's then-boyfriend Fred Melton. In the summer of 1940, Williams initiated a relationship with Kip Kiernan (1918–1944), a young dancer he met in Provincetown, Massachusetts. When Kiernan left him to marry a woman, Williams was distraught. Kiernan's death four years later at age 26 was another heavy blow.

In 1938, Williams arrived in New Orleans, where he maintained an apartment at 1014 Dumaine St. and authored his renowned play A Streetcar Named Desire.

On a 1945 visit to Taos, New Mexico, Williams met Pancho Rodríguez y González, a hotel clerk of Mexican heritage. Rodríguez was prone to jealous rages and excessive drinking, and their relationship was tempestuous. In February 1946, Rodríguez left New Mexico to join Williams in his New Orleans apartment. They lived and traveled together until late 1947, when Williams ended the relationship. Rodríguez and Williams remained friends, however, and were in contact as late as the 1970s.

Williams spent the spring and summer of 1948 in Rome in the company of a young man named "Rafaello" in Williams's Memoirs. He provided financial assistance to the younger man for several years afterward. Williams drew from this for his first novel, The Roman Spring of Mrs. Stone.

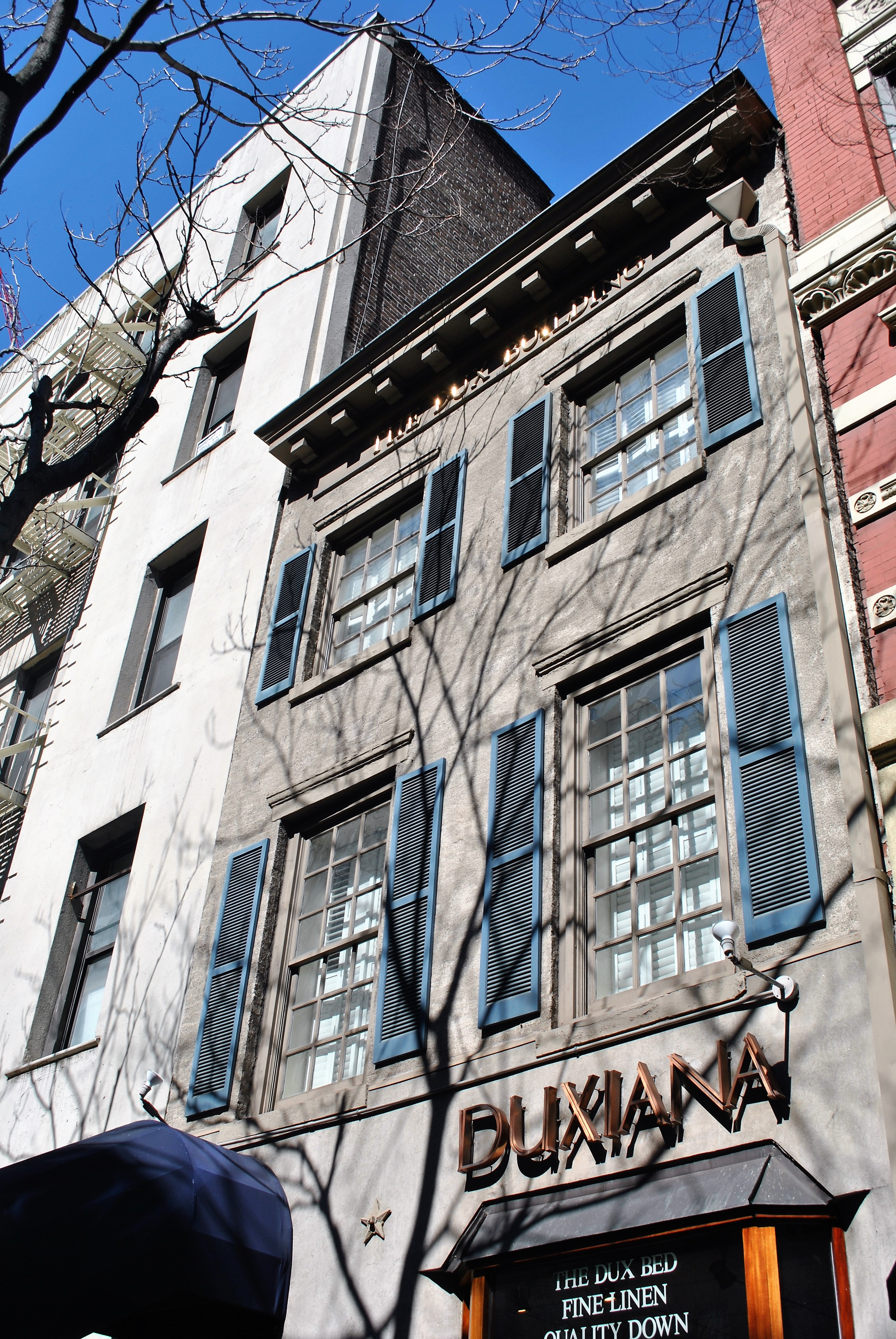
235 E 58th Street, New York City

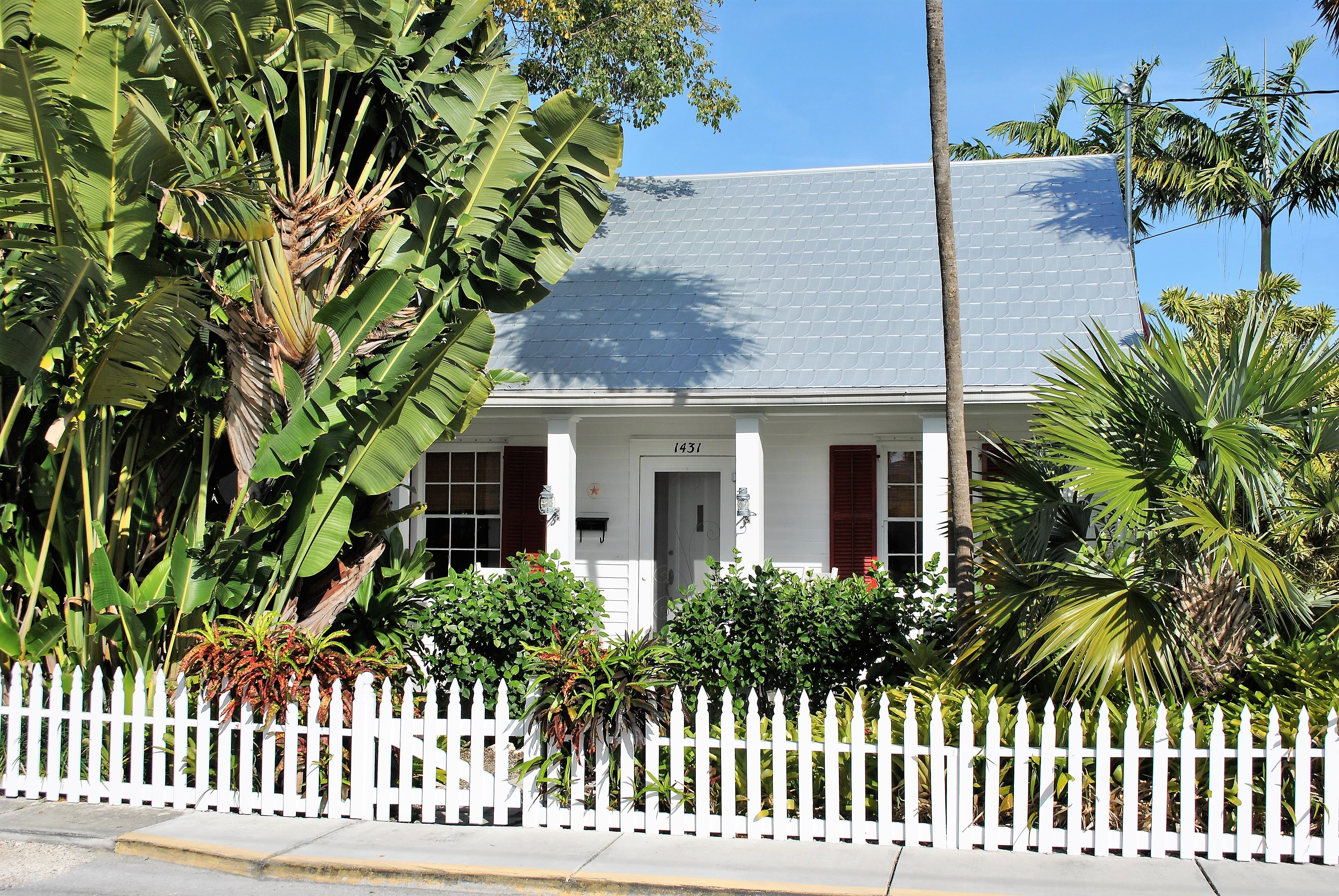
Tennessee Williams's house in Key West, Florida

When he returned to New York City, Williams met and fell in love with Frank Merlo (1921–1963). An occasional actor of Sicilian ancestry, he had served in the U.S. Navy during World War II. This was the enduring romantic relationship of Williams's life, and it lasted 14 years until infidelities and drug abuse on both sides ended it. Merlo, who had become Williams's personal secretary, took on most of the details of their domestic life. He provided a period of happiness and stability, acting as a balance to the playwright's frequent bouts with depression. Williams feared that, like his sister Rose, he would fall into insanity. His years with Merlo, in an apartment in Manhattan and a modest house in Key West, Florida were Williams's happiest and most productive. Shortly after their breakup, Merlo was diagnosed with inoperable lung cancer. Williams returned to him and cared for him until his death on September 20, 1963.

In the years following Merlo's death, Williams descended into a period of nearly catatonic depression and increasing drug use, which resulted in several hospitalizations and commitments to mental health facilities. He submitted to injections by Dr. Max Jacobson, known popularly as Dr. Feelgood, who used increasing amounts of amphetamines to overcome Williams's depression. Jacobson combined these with prescriptions for the sedative Seconal to relieve Williams's insomnia. During this time, influenced by his brother, a Roman Catholic convert, Williams joined the Catholic Church; however, he never attributed much significance to religion in his personal life. He was never truly able to recover his earlier success, or to entirely overcome his dependence on prescription drugs.

As Williams grew older, he felt increasingly alone; he feared old age and losing his sexual appeal to younger gay men. In the 1970s, when he was in his 60s, Williams had a lengthy relationship with Robert Carroll, a Vietnam War veteran and aspiring writer in his 20s. Williams had deep affection for Carroll and respect for what he saw as the younger man's talents. Along with Williams's sister Rose, Carroll was one of the two people who received a bequest in Williams's will. Williams described Carroll's behavior as a combination of "sweetness" and "beastliness". Because Carroll had a drug problem, as did Williams, friends including Maria Britneva saw the relationship as destructive. Williams wrote that Carroll played on his "acute loneliness" as an aging gay man. When the two men broke up in 1979, Williams called Carroll a "twerp", but they remained friends until Williams died four years later.

For several years, Williams split his time living at his Key West house, his New Orleans apartment, and his suite at the Hotel Elysée in New York City.

== Death ==
On February 25, 1983, Williams was found dead at age 71 in his suite at the Hotel Elysée in New York City. Chief Medical Examiner of New York City Elliot M. Gross reported that Williams had choked to death from inhaling the plastic cap of the type used on bottles of nasal spray or eye solution. However, the report was corrected on August 14, 1983, to state that Williams had been using the plastic cap found in his mouth to ingest barbiturates and had actually died from a toxic level of secobarbital.

He wrote in his will in 1972:

I, Thomas Lanier (Tennessee) Williams, being in sound mind upon this subject, and having declared this wish repeatedly to my close friends—do hereby state my desire to be buried at sea. More specifically, I wish to be buried at sea at as close a possible point as the American poet Hart Crane died by choice in the sea; this would be ascrnatible [sic], this geographic point, by the various books (biographical) upon his life and death. I wish to be sewn up in a canvas sack and dropped overboard, as stated above, as close as possible to where Hart Crane was given by himself to the great mother of life which is the sea: the Caribbean, specifically, if that fits the geography of his death. Otherwise—whereever fits it [sic].

However, his brother Dakin Williams arranged for him to be buried at Calvary Cemetery in St. Louis, Missouri, where his mother is buried.

According to The New York Times, "most of his estate was left to the University of the South in Sewanee, Tennessee, with the bulk of it to remain in trust for his sister during her lifetime." Tennessee's sister Rose died in 1996 after many years in a mental institution in New York state; the university subsequently received about $7 million, which supports a creative writing program.

== Posthumous recognition ==
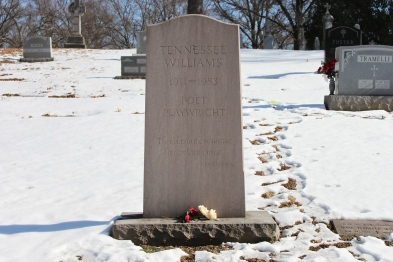
Williams's grave at Calvary Cemetery in St. Louis

From February 1 to July 21, 2011, to commemorate the 100th anniversary of his birth, the Harry Ransom Center at the University of Texas at Austin, the home of Williams's archive, exhibited 250 of his personal items. The exhibit, titled "Becoming Tennessee Williams", included a collection of Williams manuscripts, correspondence, photographs and artwork. The Ransom Center holds the earliest and largest collections of Williams's papers, including all of his earliest manuscripts, the papers of his mother Edwina Williams, and those of his long-time agent Audrey Wood.

In late 2009, Williams was inducted into the Poets' Corner at the Cathedral of Saint John the Divine in New York. Performers and artists who took part in his induction included Vanessa Redgrave, playwright John Guare, Eli Wallach, Sylvia Miles, Gregory Mosher, and Ben (Griessmeyer) Berry.

The Tennessee Williams Theatre in Key West, Florida, is named for him. The Tennessee Williams Key West Exhibit on Truman Avenue houses rare Williams memorabilia, photographs, and pictures including his famous typewriter.

At the time of his death, Williams had been working on a final play, In Masks Outrageous and Austere, which attempted to reconcile certain forces and facts of his own life. This was a continuing theme in his work. As of September 2007, author Gore Vidal was completing the play, and Peter Bogdanovich was slated to direct its Broadway debut. The play received its world premiere in New York City in April 2012, directed by David Schweizer and starring Shirley Knight as Babe.

The rectory of St. Paul's Episcopal Church in Columbus, Mississippi, where Williams's grandfather Dakin was rector at the time of Williams's birth, was moved to another location in 1993 for preservation. It was renovated in 2010 for use by the City of Columbus as the Tennessee Williams Welcome Center.

Williams's literary legacy is represented by the literary agency headed by Georges Borchardt.

In 1985, French author-composer Michel Berger wrote a song dedicated to Tennessee Williams, "Quelque chose de Tennessee" (Something of Tennessee), for Johnny Hallyday. It became one of the singer's more famous songs.

Since 1986, the Tennessee Williams/New Orleans Literary Festival has been held annually in New Orleans, Louisiana, in commemoration of the playwright. The festival takes place at the end of March to coincide with Williams's birthday.

The Tennessee Williams Songbook is a one woman show written and directed by David Kaplan, a Williams scholar and curator of Provincetown's Tennessee Williams Festival, and starring Tony Award nominated actress Alison Fraser. The show features songs taken from plays of Williams's canon, woven together with text to create a new narrative. The show premiered at the Tennessee Williams/New Orleans Literary Festival. The show was recorded on CD and distributed by Ghostlight Records.

In 2014 Williams was one of the inaugural honorees in the Rainbow Honor Walk, a walk of fame in San Francisco's Castro neighborhood noting LGBTQ people who have "made significant contributions in their fields."

In 2015, The Tennessee Williams Theatre Company of New Orleans was founded by Co-Artistic Directors Nick Shackleford and Augustin J Correro. The New Orleans–based non-profit theatre company is the first year-round professional theatre company that focuses exclusively on the works of Williams.

"[T]here used to be two streetcars in New Orleans. One was named Desire and the other was called Cemeteries. To get where you were going, you changed from the first to the second. In [his] stories and in those plays, Tennessee validated with his genius our common ticket of transfer."—Biographer and critic Gore Vidal in the Introduction to Tennessee Williams: Collected Stories (1985)

Since 2016, St. Louis, Missouri has held an annual Tennessee Williams Festival, featuring a main production and related events such as literary discussions and new plays inspired by his work.

The U.S. Postal Service honored Williams on a stamp issued on October 13, 1995 as part of its literary arts series.

Williams is honored with a star on the St. Louis Walk of Fame. He is also inducted into the Clarksdale Walk of Fame.

On October 17, 2019, the Mississippi Writers Trail installed a historical marker commemorating William's literary contributions during his namesake festival produced by the City of Clarksdale, Mississippi.

Williams is included in Mississippi's float for the 137th Rose Parade.

== Works ==
Characters in his plays are often seen as representations of his family members. Laura Wingfield in The Glass Menagerie is thought to be modeled on his sister Rose. Some biographers believed that the character of Blanche DuBois in A Streetcar Named Desire also is based on her and that the mental deterioration of Blanche's character is inspired by Rose's mental health struggles.

Amanda Wingfield in The Glass Menagerie generally was taken to represent Williams's mother Edwina. Characters such as Tom Wingfield in The Glass Menagerie and Sebastian in Suddenly, Last Summer were understood to represent Williams himself. In addition, he used a lobotomy as a motif in Suddenly, Last Summer.

The Pulitzer Prize for Drama was awarded to A Streetcar Named Desire in 1948 and to Cat on a Hot Tin Roof in 1955. These two plays later were adapted as highly successful films by noted directors Elia Kazan (Streetcar), with whom Williams developed a very close artistic relationship, and Richard Brooks (Cat). Both plays included references to elements of Williams's life such as homosexuality, mental instability, and alcoholism.

Although The Flowering Peach by Clifford Odets was the preferred choice of the Pulitzer Prize jury in 1955, and Cat on a Hot Tin Roof was at first considered the weakest of the five shortlisted nominees, Joseph Pulitzer Jr., chairman of the Board, had seen Cat on a Hot Tin Roof and thought it worthy of the drama prize. The Board went along with him after considerable discussion.

Williams wrote The Parade, or Approaching the End of a Summer when he was 29, and worked on it sporadically throughout his life. A semi-autobiographical depiction of his 1940 romance with Kip Kiernan in Provincetown, Massachusetts, it was produced for the first time on October 1, 2006, in Provincetown by the Shakespeare on the Cape production company. This was part of the First Annual Provincetown Tennessee Williams Festival. Something Cloudy, Something Clear (1981) is also based on his memories of Provincetown in the 1940s.

His last play went through many drafts as he was trying to reconcile what would be the end of his life. There are many versions of it, but it is referred to as In Masks Outrageous and Austere.

=== Plays ===
- Beauty Is the Word (1930). Awarded an Honorable Mention in the 8th Annual One-Act Play Contest sponsored by the Dramatic Arts Club of the University of Missouri
- Candles to the Sun (1936)
- Fugitive Kind (1937)
- Spring Storm (1937)
- Me Vashya (1937)
- Not About Nightingales (1938)
- Battle of Angels (1940)
- I Rise in Flame, Cried the Phoenix (1941)
- The Glass Menagerie (1944)
- You Touched Me! (1945)
- Stairs to the Roof (1947)
- A Streetcar Named Desire (1947)
- Summer and Smoke (1948)
- The Rose Tattoo (1951)
- Camino Real (1953)
- Cat on a Hot Tin Roof (1955)
- Orpheus Descending (1957)
- Suddenly Last Summer (1958)
- Sweet Bird of Youth (1959)
- Period of Adjustment (1960)
- The Night of the Iguana (1961)
- The Eccentricities of a Nightingale (1962, rewriting of Summer and Smoke)
- The Milk Train Doesn't Stop Here Anymore (1963)
- The Mutilated (1965)
- The Seven Descents of Myrtle (1968, aka Kingdom of Earth)
- In the Bar of a Tokyo Hotel (1969)
- Will Mr. Merriweather Return from Memphis? (1969)
- Small Craft Warnings (1972)
- The Two-Character Play (1973)
- Out Cry (1973, rewriting of The Two-Character Play)
- The Red Devil Battery Sign (1975)
- This Is (An Entertainment) (1976)
- Vieux Carré (1977)
- Tiger Tail (1978)
- A Lovely Sunday for Creve Coeur (1979)
- Clothes for a Summer Hotel (1980)
- The Notebook of Trigorin (1980)
- Something Cloudy, Something Clear (1981)
- A House Not Meant to Stand (1982)
- In Masks Outrageous and Austere (1983)

=== Novels ===
- The Roman Spring of Mrs. Stone (1950, adapted for films in 1961 and 2003)
- Moise and the World of Reason (1975)

=== Screenplays and teleplays ===
- The Glass Menagerie (1950)
- A Streetcar Named Desire (1951)
- The Rose Tattoo (1955)
- Baby Doll (1956)
- Cat on a Hot Tin Roof (1958)
- Suddenly, Last Summer (1959)
- The Fugitive Kind (1960)
- Summer and Smoke (1961)
- Sweet Bird of Youth (1962)
- Period of Adjustment (1962)
- The Night of the Iguana (1964)
- Ten Blocks on the Camino Real (1966)
- Boom! (1968)
- Stopped Rocking and Other Screenplays (1984)
- Orpheus Descending (1990)
- The Loss of a Teardrop Diamond (2009; screenplay from 1957)

=== Short stories ===
- "The Vengeance of Nitocris" (1928)
- "The Field of Blue Children" (1939)
- "Oriflamme" (1944)
- "The Resemblance Between a Violin Case and a Coffin" (1951)
- One Arm and Other Stories (1948)
  - "One Arm"
  - "The Malediction"
  - "The Poet"
  - "Chronicle of a Demise"
  - "Desire and the Black Masseur"
  - "Portrait of a Girl in Glass"
  - "The Important Thing"
  - "The Angel in the Alcove"
  - "The Field of Blue Children"
  - "The Night of the Iguana"
  - "The Yellow Bird"
- Hard Candy: A Book of Stories (1954)
  - "Three Players of a Summer Game"
  - "Two on a Party"
  - "The Resemblance between a Violin Case and a Coffin"
  - "Hard Candy"
  - "Rubio y Morena"
  - "The Mattress by the Tomato Patch"
  - "The Coming of Something to the Widow Holly"
  - "The Vine"
  - "The Mysteries of the Joy Rio"
- The Knightly Quest: a Novella and Four Short Stories (1966)
  - "The Knightly Quest"
  - "Mama's Old Stucco House"
  - "Man Bring This Up Road"
  - "The Kingdom of Earth"
  - "Grand"
- Eight Mortal Ladies Possessed: a Book of Stories (1974)
  - "Happy August the Tenth"
  - "The Inventory at Fontana Belle"
  - "Miss Coynte of Greeme"
  - "Sabbatha and Solitude"
  - "Completed"
  - "Oriflamme"
- "Tent Worms" (1980)
- It Happened the Day the Sun Rose (1981), published by Sylvester & Orphanos
- Collected Stories (1985) (New Directions)
- The Caterpillar Dogs and Other Stories (2023) (New Directions)
  - "The Caterpillar Dogs"
  - "Season of Grapes"
  - "Every Friday Nite is Kiddies Nite"
  - "Ironweed"
  - "They Go Like a Thistle, He Said"
  - "Till One or the Other Gits Back"
  - "Stair to the Roof"

=== One-act plays ===
Williams wrote more than 70 one-act plays during his lifetime. The one-acts explored many of the same themes that dominated his longer works. Williams's major collections are published by New Directions in New York City.

- 27 Wagons Full of Cotton and Other Plays (1946 and 1953)
  - Something Wild... (introduction) (1953)
  - 27 Wagons Full of Cotton (1946 and 1953)
  - The Purification (1946 and 1953)
  - The Lady of Larkspur Lotion (1946 and 1953)
  - The Last of My Solid Gold Watches (1946 and 1953)
  - Portrait of a Madonna (1946 and 1953)
  - Auto-da-Fé (1946 and 1953)
  - Lord Byron's Love Letter (1946 and 1953)
  - The Strangest Kind of Romance (1946 and 1953)
  - The Long Goodbye (1946 and 1953)
  - At Liberty (1946)
  - Moony's Kid Don't Cry (1946)
  - Hello from Bertha (1946 and 1953)
  - This Property Is Condemned (1946 and 1953)
  - Talk to Me Like the Rain and Let Me Listen... (1953)
  - Something Unspoken (1953)
- American Blues (1948)
  - The Dark Room (1948)
  - Ten Blocks on the Camino Real (1948)
  - The Case of the Crushed Petunias (1948)
  - The Unsatisfactory Supper (1946)
  - Moony's Kid Don't Cry (1941)
- Dragon Country: a book of one-act plays (1970)
  - In the Bar of a Tokyo Hotel (1969)
  - I Rise in Flame, Cried the Phoenix (1941)
  - The Mutilated (1966)
  - I Can't Imagine Tomorrow (1970)
  - Confessional (1967)
  - The Frosted Glass Coffin (1970)
  - The Gnädiges Fräulein (1966)
  - A Perfect Analysis Given by a Parrot (1958)
- The Theatre of Tennessee Williams, Volume VI (1981; reprinted the one-act plays included in the second edition of 27 Wagons Full of Cotton and Other Plays with three additions:)
  - The Unsatisfactory Supper (1946)
  - Steps Must Be Gentle (1980)
  - The Demolition Downtown (1970)
- The Theatre of Tennessee Williams, Volume VII (1981; reprinted the one-act plays included in Dragon Country: a book of one-act plays with three additions:)
  - Lifeboat Drill (1979)
  - Now the Cats with Jewelled Claws (1969)
  - This is the Peaceable Kingdom (1980)
- Mister Paradise and Other One-Act Plays (2005)
  - These Are the Stairs You Got to Watch
  - Mister Paradise
  - The Palooka (1937)
  - Escape (1937)
  - Why Do You Smoke So Much, Lily? (1935)
  - Summer at the Lake (1937)
  - The Big Game
  - The Pink Bedroom
  - The Fat Man's Wife (1938)
  - Thank You, Kind Spirit
  - The Municipal Abattoir
  - Adam and Eve on a Ferry (1939)
  - And Tell Sad Stories of the Deaths of Queens (1962)
- The Traveling Companion and Other Plays (2008)
  - The Chalky White Substance (1980)
  - The Day on Which a Man Dies (An Occidental Noh Play)
  - A Cavalier for Milady (1976)
  - The Pronoun "I"
  - The Remarkable Rooming-House of Mme. Le Monde
  - Kirche, Kueche, Kinder (An Outrage for the Stage) (1979)
  - Green Eyes
  - The Parade, or Approaching the End of a Summer (1941)
  - The One Exception (1983)
  - Sunburst
  - Will Mr. Merriweather Return from Memphis? (1980)
  - The Traveling Companion
- The Magic Tower and Other One-Act Plays (2011)
  - At Liberty (1939)
  - The Magic Tower (1936)
  - Me, Vashya (1937)
  - Curtains for the Gentleman (1936)
  - In Our Profession (1938)
  - Every Twenty Minutes (1938)
  - Honor the Living (1937)
  - The Case of the Crushed Petunias (1941)
  - Moony's Kid Don't Cry (1936)
  - The Dark Room (1939)
  - The Pretty Trap (1944)
  - Interior: Panic (1946)
  - Kingdom of Earth (1967)
  - I Never Get Dressed Till After Dark on Sundays (1973)
  - Some Problems for the Moose Lodge (1980)
- Now the Cats with Jeweled Claws and Other One-Act Plays (2016)
  - A Recluse and His Guest (1982)
  - Now the Cats with Jeweled Claws (1981)
  - Steps Must Be Gentle (1980)
  - Ivan's Widow (1982)
  - This Is the Peaceable Kingdom (1981)
  - Aimez-vous Ionesco? (c.1975)
  - The Demolition Downtown (1971)
  - Lifeboat Drill (1979)
  - Once in a Lifetime (1939)
  - The Strange Play (1939)

=== Poetry ===
While his dramatic works overshadow his verse, Tennessee was a prolific poet. He was first published in the newspaper of his junior high school in 1924, and later in life many of his poems would appear in notable magazines (including Playboy, Esquire, and the New Yorker). He would also add poems to the stage notes for his plays and even his personal correspondence.

- In the Winter of Cities (1956)
- Androgyne, Mon Amour (1977)
- The Collected Poems of Tennessee Williams (2002)

=== Non-fiction ===
- Memoirs (1975)
- New Selected Essays: Where I Live (2009)

=== Selected works ===
- Gussow, Mel and Holditch, Kenneth, eds. Tennessee Williams, Plays 1937–1955 (Library of America, 2000) ISBN 978-1-883011-86-4.
  - Spring Storm
  - Not About Nightingales
  - Battle of Angels
  - I Rise in Flame, Cried the Phoenix
  - From 27 Wagons Full of Cotton (1946)
    - 27 Wagons Full of Cotton
    - The Lady of Larkspur Lotion
    - The Last of My Solid Gold Watches
    - Portrait of a Madonna
    - Auto-da-Fé
    - Lord Byron's Love Letter
    - This Property Is Condemned
  - The Glass Menagerie
  - A Streetcar Named Desire
  - Summer and Smoke
  - The Rose Tattoo
  - Camino Real
  - From 27 Wagons Full of Cotton (1953)
    - "Something Wild"
    - Talk to Me Like the Rain and Let Me Listen
    - Something Unspoken
  - Cat on a Hot Tin Roof
- Gussow, Mel, and Holditch, Kenneth, eds. Tennessee Williams, Plays 1957–1980 (Library of America, 2000) ISBN 978-1-883011-87-1.
  - Orpheus Descending
  - Suddenly, Last Summer
  - Sweet Bird of Youth
  - Period of Adjustment
  - The Night of the Iguana
  - The Eccentricities of a Nightingale
  - The Milk Train Doesn't Stop Here Anymore
  - The Mutilated
  - Kingdom of Earth (The Seven Descents of Myrtle)
  - Small Craft Warnings
  - Out Cry
  - Vieux Carré
  - A Lovely Sunday for Creve Coeur
  - "Crazy Night"

== See also ==
- Tennessee Williams/New Orleans Literary Festival
- Virginia Spencer Carr, friend and biographer of Williams
- Audrey Wood
