= Irwin Shaw bibliography =

List of works by or about Irwin Shaw, American author.

== Novels ==
- The young lions (1948)
- The Troubled Air (1951)
- Lucy Crown (1956)
- A Preface and Four Seasons (1959) with five signed lithographs by the painter John Levee
- Two Weeks in Another Town (1960)
- Voices of a Summer Day (1965)
- Rich Man, Poor Man (1969/1970)
- Evening in Byzantium (1973)
- Night Work (1975)
- Beggarman, Thief (1977)
- The Top of the Hill (1979)
- Bread Upon the Waters (1981)
- Acceptable Losses (1982)

== Short fiction ==
Collections

- Sailor off the Bremen and Other Stories (1939)
- Welcome to the City and Other Stories (1942)
- Act of Faith and Other Stories (1946)
- Mixed Company. Collected Short Stories (1950)
- Tip on a Dead Jockey and Other Stories (1957)
- Selected Short Stories (1961)
- Love on a Dark Street, and other stories (1965)
- Retreat and other stories (1970)
- Whispers in Bedlam (1972)
- God Was Here, But He Left Early (1973)
- Short Stories: Five Decades (1978)

Stories

Title	Year	First published	Reprinted/collected	Notes
The convert			Shaw, Irwin (1953). "The convert". In Birmingham, Frederic A. (ed.). The girls from Esquire. London: Arthur Barker. pp. 78–92.	

== Non-fiction ==
- Report on Israel (1950, with Robert Capa)
- In the Company of Dolphins (1964)
- Paris! Paris! (1976)

== Plays ==
- Bury the Dead, New York, Ethel Barrymore Theatre, April 1936.
- Siege, New York, Longacre Theatre, December 1937.
- The Gentle People, New York, Belasco Theatre, January 1939.
- Quiet City New York, Belasco Theatre, March 1939.
- Retreat to Pleasure, New York, Belasco Theatre, 1940.
- Sons and Soldiers, New York, Morosco Theatre, May 1943.
- The Assassin, New York, National Theatre, October 1945.
- The Survivors, (with Peter Viertel) New York, Playhouse Theatre, January 1948.
- Children From Their Games, New York, Morosco Theatre, April 1963.
- A Choice of Wars, Glasgow, Scotland, Glasgow Citizens Theatre, 1967.

== Screenplays ==
- The Big Game, RKO, 1936.
- Commandos Strike at Dawn, Columbia, 1942.
- The Hard Way, Warner Bros., 1942.
- The Talk of the Town, RKO, 1942.
- Take One False Step, Universal, 1949.
- Easy Living, RKO, 1949.
- I Want You, RKO, 1951.
- Act of Love, United Artists, 1953.
- Ulysses, Paramount, 1954.
- Fire Down Below, Columbia, 1957.
- Desire Under the Elms, Paramount, 1958.
- This Angry Age, Columbia, 1958.
- The Big Gamble, Fox, 1961.
- In the French Style, Columbia, 1963.
- Survival, United Film, 1968.
