= Sailor off the Bremen and Other Stories =

Collection of short fiction by Irwin Shaw

- First edition
- Author: Irwin Shaw
- Language: English
- Publisher: Random House
- Publication date: 1939
- Publication place: United States
- Media type: Print (hardback)
- OCLC: 1508416

Sailor Off the Bremen and Other Stories is a collection of short fiction by Irwin Shaw published in 1939 by Random House. The volume includes one of Shaw's most critically acclaimed short stories, "The Girls in Their Summer Dresses."

== Stories ==
Those stories first appearing in a literary magazine are indicated.

- "Sailor off the Bremen" (The New Yorker, February 25, 1939)
- "I Stand by Dempsey" (The New Yorker, March 3, 1939)
- "The Girls in Their Summer Dresses" (The New Yorker, February 4, 1939)
- "Return to Kansas City" (The New Yorker, July 15, 1939)
- "The Deputy Sheriff"
- "Second Mortgage"
- "'March, March on Down the Field'" (The New Yorker, November 19, 1938)
- "Walk along the Charles River"
- "No Jury Would Convict" (The New Yorker, October 7, 1937)
- "Santa Claus"
- The Monument" (Esquire, June 1939)
- "The Greek General" (Collier's, October 15, 1938)
- "My Green Flower"
- "Strawberry Ice Cream Soda"
- "The Boss"
- "Little Henry Irving"
- "Stop pushing, Rocky"
- "Residents of Other Cities" (Esquire, July 1939)
- Weep in Years to Come" (The New Yorker, July 1, 1939)
- "Borough of Cemeteries" (The New Yorker, August 13, 1938)

== Critical appraisal ==
By the mid-1930s, Shaw's short fiction was appearing frequently in the major literary journals of the day, among these Esquire, Collier's, Harper's and The New Yorker: "By 1948, he had contributed so regularly the latter that that he was regarded as one of the most prominent of a group known as New Yorker (italics) writers."

The stories that comprise The Sailor Off the Bremen represent Shaw's establishment as a literary figure among the young writers associated, in particular, with The New Yorker: "For more than a decade before his first novel, The Young Lions, appeared in 1948…Shaw had steadily been building his reputation as a master of the short story." When it appeared in 1939, the collection included some of Shaw's most impressive short fiction, including "The Girls in Their Summer Dresses," "Second Marriage," "Weep in Years to Come," and the title story.

Critic with The New York Times, Herbert Mitgang, notes that "Shaw was most admired for his short stories of the 1930's and 40's, which served as a model for an entire generation of writers." Mitgang adds: "Stylistically, Mr. Shaw's short stories were noted for their directness of language, the quick strokes with which he established his different characters, and a strong sense of plotting."

Biographer Michael Shnayerson reports that those narratives set in New York City had "real heft" as opposed to those set in west of the Mississippi River, such as "The Deputy Sheriff" and "Walk Along the Charles River" which he considers "lack authenticity."

Though critical assessment was widely supportive of the collection, Shnayerson notes that Alfred Kazin regarded many of the stories as "thoroughly bad," dubbing Shaw "half a writer."

== Theme ==
"These depression era stories work because Shaw presents characters who are too defeated or too confused by the sheer struggle for survival to protest effectively. Yet the stories themselves call for drastic change in the system. The inevitable result is a cutting irony which is more effective than any overt propaganda could ever be." —Biographer James R. Giles in Irwin Shaw (1983)

Biographer and critic James R. Giles enumerates the thematic elements evident in Sailor Off the Bremen, as well as Shaw's second volume of short fiction, Welcome to the City and Other Stories (1942):

Three thematic concerns were dominant in these first two volumes: the effects of the depression on the middle and lower classes; the threat to American values inherent in the rise of fascism at home and abroad; and the moral shallowness of the core of the American success story."

This depression-era fiction focuses on the working class who suffered in the aftermath of the Panic of 1929 and the devastating effects of the Great Depression. Shaw's themes were largely those of the political Left in the United States at this time—identifying capitalism as a system destructive and degrading to the masses, and sympathetic to socialism. The stories, however, do not emerge as overt propaganda, but rather Shaw's literary concerns.

== Sources ==
- Barnes, Bart. 1984. "Irwin Shaw, 71, Prolific American Writer, Dies." The Washington Post, May 17, 1984. https://www.washingtonpost.com/archive/local/1984/05/17/irwin-shaw-71-prolific-american-writer-dies/d55783d9-1709-417e-9640-609cc78a4e57/ Retrieved 15 December 2023.
- Gabler, Neal. 1989. "Nothing Fails Like Success: IRWIN SHAW: A Biography." The Los Angeles Times, October 22, 1989. https://www.latimes.com/archives/la-xpm-1989-10-22-bk-742-story.html Retrieved 15 December 2023.
- Giles, James R. 1983. Irwin Shaw. Twayne Publishers, Boston, Massachusetts. G. K. Hall & Co. ISBN 0-8057-7382-7
- Liukkonen, Petri and Pesonen, Ari. 2022. "Irwin Shaw (1913-1984)." Author's Calendar: Books and Writers, 2008-2022.http://authorscalendar.info/ishaw.htm Retrieved 12 December 2023.
- Mitgang, Herbert. 1984. "IRWIN SHAW, EXTOLLED FOR SHORT STORIES, DIES" The New York Times, May 17, 1984. https://www.nytimes.com/1984/05/17/obituaries/irwin-shaw-extolled-for-short-stories-dies.html Retrieved 13 December 2023.
- Rosenfeld, Isaac. 1956. "Left-Wing Middle-Brow: Act of Faith and Other Stories" Commentary, November 1956. https://www.commentary.org/articles/isaac-rosenfeld/act-of-faith-and-other-stories-by-irwin-shaw/aac Retrieved 15 December 2023.
- Shaw, Irwin. 1954. Selected Short Stories of Irwin Shaw. The Modern Library, New York. Library of Congress Catalog Number: 61-10674
- Shnayerson, Michael. 1989. Irwin Shaw: A Biography. G. P. Putnam's Sons, New York. ISBN 0-399-13443-3
