= Walking Wounded (short story) =

"The Walking Wounded"
- Short story by Irwin Shaw
- Country: United States
- Language: English

Publication
- Published in: The New Yorker
- Publication date: May 13, 1944

"Walking Wounded” is a work of short fiction by Irwin Shaw, originally appearing in The New Yorker on May 13, 1944, and first collected in Act of Faith and Other Stories (1946) by Random House. The story was carried by Stars and Stripes during the war.

The story won the 1944 O. Henry Award Memorial Award First Prize, and is regarded as Shaw’s finest treatment of war in his works of short fiction. “Walking Wounded” is “probably Shaw’s most famous war story.”

== Plot ==
The story is told from a third-person limited omniscient. The focal character is a Scottish army Captain who is identified by his first name only, Peter.

During the opening months of World War II, Peter had fought at Battle of Dunkirk. Though a newlywed, he enjoyed the company of a French officer’s wife while on leave. Reunited with his wife in London after the evacuation of France he vowed to himself never to again betray his beloved spouse. He is immediately deployed to fight in North Africa. When the story opens, Peter has been in the Africa theater of war for three years. For five months he was stationed in Cairo after his regiment was decimated in combat against the German army’s Afrika Corps. He has been exempt from field duty and assigned to a desk job after being “medically graded” (unfit for fighting). Mac, his only friend, is a non-commissioned officer and, like Peter, has been assigned to office duty.

Peter has descended into an abyss of demoralization and misanthropy. Celibate for three years in deference to his young wife, he reserves a special contempt for British women, who he believes are exploiting their war-zone advantages where females are at a premium. He is tortured by the thought Anne might be having an affair with one of the tens-of-thousands of American soldiers stationed in England. Peter is further distressed when he realizes that he can no longer visualize Anne’s face. When Mac counsels Peter that “you ought to get yourself a girl”, Pete complies. On a date with a young British woman named Joyce, Peter disgorges all his insecurities related to his long separation from Anne. His neurotic outburst causes Joyce, appalled at what she interprets as social ineptitude, to excuse herself and join another officer. Peter flees to a bar reserved for commissioned officers where he proceeds to engage in friendly drunken banter with some South African and American aviators. The Americans are about to fly to London for a week’s leave and they invite Peter to join them. He is overcome with joy at the prospect of being reunited with his wife. He rushes away to obtain permission from his commanding officer, Colonel Foster; Peter feels certain that Foster will be sympathetic to his request.

Peter is shaken to discover that the residence is no longer occupied by Foster, but by a Colonel Gaines. Peter is further dismayed that the senior officer knows nothing of Foster’s whereabouts. Shattered, Peter walks aimlessly along the banks of the Nile in the dead of night. For a moment he sobs, then braces himself. He clutches at the prospect that he might soon receive a letter from his wife which would provide some stability to his existence.

== Reception ==
Biographer Michael Shnayerson reports that Stars & Stripes reproduced a key passage from the story in 1944 in which the protagonist, Peter, in conversation with his bemused comrade Mac, issues a diatribe directed at European and American women in war zones:

I hate these women out here. Having the best time of their lives. Ugly, impossible girls that no one would ever look at in peacetime, just because there are a hundred men for every woman…Snobbish, overconfident…Bitches, all of them. A man has to sacrifice all decent, male pride to chase after one of these…They demand abasement, homage, the ugliest, most horrible and meanest of them. Women have been among the most horrible of the war’s casualties. All humiliations gone, all normal values, all friendship. They’re man-greedy. They’re profiteering on the war, like the worst usurer and manufacturer of machine tools, except that their profits are lieutenants and generals, not cash. After the war we should have rehabilitation hospitals for women who have been in troop areas, just like the hospitals for maimed men, to teach them how to live normal lives again...

The response among active duty servicemen was positive. The misogynistic speech “stirred a huge response of letters from soldiers from all over the European theater who felt that Shaw had given voice to their inchoate feelings.”

In acknowledgment of its excellence, “Walking Wounded” received the 1944 O. Henry Award Memorial Award First Prize.

Critic William Peden in Saturday Review included “Walking Wounded” among Shaw’s “most memorable stories” and those “directly or indirectly connected with war and the effect of war, violence and intolerance.” “Walking Wounded” is considered “probably Shaw’s most famous war story.”

== Sources ==
- Giles, James R.. 1983. Irwin Shaw. Twayne Publishers, Boston, Massachusetts. G. K. Hall & Co. ISBN 0-8057-7382-7
- Giles, James R. 1991. Irwin Shaw: A Study of the Short Fiction. Twayne Publishers, Boston, Massachusetts. G. K. Hall & Co. ISBN 0-8057-7382-7
- Peden, William. 1950. “Best of Irwin Shaw” in Saturday Review, November 18, 1950 p. 27-28 from Irwin Shaw: A Study of the Short Fiction. p. 184 Twayne Publishers, Boston, Massachusetts. G. K. Hall & Co. ISBN 0-8057-7382-7
- Shaw, Irwin. 1954. Selected Short Stories of Irwin Shaw. The Modern Library, New York. pp. 129–149 Library of Congress Catalog Number: 61-10674
- Shnayerson, Michael. 1989. Irwin Shaw: A Biography. G. P. Putnam’s Sons, New York. ISBN 0-399-13443-3
