= Main Currents of American Thought =

- Short story by Irwin Shaw
- Country: United States
- Language: English

Publication
- Published in: The New Yorker
- Publication date: August 5, 1939

"Main Currents of American Thought" is a work of short fiction by Irwin Shaw, originally appearing in The New Yorker in 1939 and first collected in Welcome to the City and Other Stories (1942) by Random House.

The story is an autobiographical rendering of Shaw’s early literary career, during which he had penned numerous episodes for radio dramas and comedies, among these Dick Tracy.

The story was included in the 1940 The Best American Short Stories and the editors dedicated the volume to Irwin Shaw.

== Plot ==
The story is written from a third-person limited omniscient point-of-view. The protagonist, a young man identified only as Andrew, is the focal character. The story is set in Brooklyn, New York during the Great Depression.

Andrew is a scriptwriter for a radio adventure serial. Paid by the number of words that comprise each story and its dialogue, his meager wages are spent entirely in supporting his mother, his younger sister and his father. The family, with whom the 25-year-old Andrew resides, is trying to keep up their middle-class pretensions despite their diminished income due to the economic crisis. Andrew is preoccupied with brainstorming scenarios for new material for the radio program. As he obsesses over the family expenditures, scenes from the hard-boiled dialogue he creates for the insipid radio plays intrude on his thoughts. When he discovers that his bank account is overdrawn, he makes an inventory of all his cash output, and this further distresses him. Across the street, a group of boys are practicing baseball. Their shouts to one another make Andrew, not long beyond his childhood, make him nostalgic.

Andrew, who works nights, is an insomniac. His mother, who is dedicated to performing her domestic duties, insists on operating the noisy electric vacuum while her son is attempting to sleep during the day. Each family member makes demands for money which deepens Andrew's anxiety as the family breadwinner. His mother demands $50 to buy a dress for her daughter's piano recital. Andrew objects, but relents and gives it to her.

Exasperated, he escapes the house with his baseball glove and joins the boys in the field to pitch for them. No longer a youth, he is addressed as "Mister."

== Background ==
In 1934, shortly after Shaw graduated from Brooklyn College, he visited a former professor, David Driscoll Driscoll, who had admired Shaw’s writing when his student was an undergraduate, suggested he seek work with Himan Brown, a radio producer. Desperate for work to support his parents and his younger brother, Shaw, age 21, took a position as a scriptwriter. He created the scripts for National Broadcasting Company’s Dick Tracy and The Gumps during the next two years.

This period of Shaw's earliest professional career as a writer from the narrative for Main Currents of American Thought. In a 1980 interview with biographer James R. Giles, Shaw enumerated the parallels between his story and his real life:

First of all, the character writes for the radio. And I include a long paragraph in which he dictates something very much what I used to dictate. He lives in Brooklyn, and lives on the street where I lived with my mother, my father, and my brother. I played baseball and football in the field opposite. I was in love with a girl like that one…So all these things were very autobiographical.

Shaw notes that the story was written after he had departed radio: "I was already a literary success by that time, and the character in the story is not."

== Critical appraisal ==
New York Times critic Herbert Mitgang observes that Shaw, though a successful novelist and playwright, "was most admired for his short stories of the 1930's and 40's, which served as a model for an entire generation of writers."

Literary critic James R. Giles reports that a number of Shaw's stories "rank with the most distinguished American short fiction, including 'Main Currents of American Thought' - one of the 'masterpieces' of the genre in American literature."

Critic Bart Barnes in The Washington Post calls "Main Currents of (sic) American Thought" one of Shaw's "finest stories."

== Theme ==
The title of the story is an ironic reference to literary historian Vernon Louis Parrington’s Main Currents in American Thought, an academic analysis of American literature to the 192os. Critic James R. Giles writes: "[T]he irony is that, at least on one level, the radio serials are a more realistic reflection of American mentality than Parrington’s influential book.

Despite the thread of cynicism that runs through the narrative, Andrew is not self-absorbed or truly disaffected. Giles comments on the tone of the story:

The young writer is, in fact, committed to the struggles of the present by his own decency. He cannot deny his sister a new dress any more than he can turn his back on his other responsibilities to his family or his sense of obligation to the Spanish loyalists. Fundamentally, Andrew is not a self-centered individual.

Literary critic Chester E. Eisinger offers "Main Currents in American Thought" as an example of Shaw's latent longing for economic security and his fascination with "metropolitan sophistication." As a retrospective of Shaw's struggle for economic stability during the depths of The Depression, the story reveals his petty-bourgeoisie anxieties. Eisinger writes: "The pressures imposed by money, which Shaw felt as a result of the depression, were expressed in the forties as the multifarious demands of middle-class life."

Compared to the genuine desperation experienced by the American poor in the 1930s, the autobiographical radio writer's obsession with providing the accouterments of social status—"expensive piano lessons and party dresses" for his sister—seem unwarranted. Eisinger argues that the value of these accessories are overinflated in Shaw's narrative and "do not seem to justify the tension the writer must live with."

== Sources ==
- Barnes, Bart. 1984. “Irwin Shaw, 71, Prolific American Writer, Dies.” The Washington Post, May 17, 1984. https://www.washingtonpost.com/archive/local/1984/05/17/irwin-shaw-71-prolific-american-writer-dies/d55783d9-1709-417e-9640-609cc78a4e57/ Retrieved 15 December 2023.
- Eisinger. Chester E.. 1963. “Fiction and the Liberal Reassessment” in Fiction of the Forties, University of Chicago Press in Irwin Shaw. Twayne Publishers, Boston, Massachusetts. G. K. Hall & Co. pp. 203–209 ISBN 0-8057-7382-7
- Fiedler, Leslie A. 1956. “On the Horizon: Irwin Shaw: Adultery, the Last Politics.” Cpmmentary, July 1956. Leslhttps://www.commentary.org/articles/leslie-fiedler/on-the-horizon-irwin-shaw-adultery-the-last-politics/ie A. Fiedler Retrieved 16 December 2023.
- Gabler, Neal. 1989. “Nothing Fails Like Success: IRWIN SHAW: A Biography.” The Los Angeles Times, October 22, 1989. Nothing Fails Like Success : IRWIN SHAW: A Biography by Michael Shnayerson (G. P. Putnam's Sons: $21.95; 441 pp., illustrated; 0-399-13443-3) Retrieved 15 December 2023.
- Giles, James R.. 1983. Irwin Shaw. Twayne Publishers, Boston, Massachusetts. G. K. Hall & Co. ISBN 0-8057-7382-7
- Giles, James Richard. 1991. Irwin Shaw: A Study of the Short Fiction. Twayne Publishers, Boston, Massachusetts. G. K. Hall & Co. ISBN 0-8057-8331-8*Mitgang, Herbert. 1984. “IRWIN SHAW, EXTOLLED FOR SHORT STORIES, DIES” The New York Times, May 17, 1984.https://www.nytimes.com/1984/05/17/obituaries/irwin-shaw-extolled-for-short-stories-dies.html Retrieved 13 December 2023.
- Shaw, Irwin. 1954. Selected Short Stories of Irwin Shaw. The Modern Library, New York. Library of Congress Catalog Number: 61-10674
