= Quiet City =

Quiet City may refer to:

- Quiet City (play), a 1939 drama by Irwin Shaw
- Quiet City (music), a 1941 composition by Aaron Copland extracted from his incidental music written for the Shaw play
- Quiet City (film), a 2007 film by Aaron Katz
- Quiet City, a video game developed by Increpare Games
