= The Girls in Their Summer Dresses =

1939 short story by Irwin Shaw

- Short story by Irwin Shaw
- Country: United States
- Language: English

Publication
- Published in: The New Yorker
- Publication date: February 4, 1939

"The Girls in Their Summer Dresses" is a work of short fiction by Irwin Shaw, originally published in The New Yorker in 1939 and first collected in Sailor off the Bremen and Other Stories (1939) by Random House.

The story is widely recognized as one of Shaw's finest short stories. It was adapted, along with two other Shaw short stories, by Kenneth Cavender for the PBS series Great Performances. The adaptation starred Carol Kane and Jeff Bridges.

== Plot ==
The story is presented from a third-person omniscient point-of-view, and set in New York City on a sunny day in autumn. Michael and Frances, a young, affluent married couple, take a Sunday morning stroll along Fifth Avenue. The wife wishes to forgo an invitation to a private party which promises to be fueled by alcoholic beverages; she prefers to spend the day with her husband. She suggests they attend a football game, have dinner at Cavanagh's afterwards and catch a French film in the evening.

The husband is distracted by the many pretty women promenading along Washington Square, and his wife notices his roving eye: she gently chastens him, and he protests his innocence. Frances interprets Michael's habitual girl-watching as a potential precursor to infidelity. Michael demurs, and assures her he has not cheated on her during their five years of marriage. Frances in turn informs him that she has never desired another man since their second date.

The couple stop in a bistro and order drinks. A protracted debate ensues. Michael explains his penchant for watching women as a healthy avocation. Frances begins to weep, and begs him not to discuss the merits of other women's attractiveness. They order more drinks, and decide that they will after all accept the invitation to the party. Michael admires her physique as she walks to away to make the phone call.

== Background ==
In an interview with Paris Review, Shaw recalled that he wrote both "The Girls in Their Summer Dresses" and "The Sailor off the Bremen" in a single week in 1938, when he was 25-years-old.

== Critical appraisal ==
Literary critic James R. Giles reports that a number of Shaw's stories "rank with the most distinguished American short fiction, including 'The Girls in Their Summer Dresses'."

Biographer Michael Shnayerson identifies the story as one that "made him famous."

Critic Luther Ray Abel in National Review observes that the story "captures [the] fraught dynamic between the sexes well. The tale is dry, painfully cogent, and brief..."

New York Times critic Herbert Mitgang wrote:

Stylistically, Mr. Shaw's short stories were noted for their directness of language, the quick strokes with which he established his different characters, and a strong sense of plotting...He was critically acclaimed for such early short stories as The Girls in Their Summer Dresses.

== Theme ==
Cleanth Brooks and Robert Penn Warren locate the theme in "a serious idea—the failure of love through the failure to recognize the beloved as a person, but as more than a convenience."

Critic James R. Giles considers the dialogue key to understanding these two self-involved urbanites:

What one senses most strongly about Michael and Frances's quarrel is that it is a ritual. Having no real communication, they fall into the quarrel as a way of talk. This impression is conveyed through the fact that neither really listens to the other; it is almost as if speaking often-rehearsed lines in a play."

Biographer Michael Shnayerson observes the pathos of the couple's relationship in that "these skirmishes are all the they have between them." The dialogue itself exposes the "emotional shallowness" of the marriage.

== Sources ==
- Abel, Luther Ray. 2023. "The Girls in Their Summer Dresses" The Nation, January 12, 2023.https://www.nationalreview.com/corner/irwin-shaws-the-girls-in-their-summer-dresses/ Retrieved 12 December 2023.
- Barnes, Bart. 1984. "Irwin Shaw, 71, Prolific American Writer, Dies." The Washington Post, May 17, 1984.https://www.washingtonpost.com/archive/local/1984/05/17/irwin-shaw-71-prolific-american-writer-dies/d55783d9-1709-417e-9640-609cc78a4e57/ Retrieved 15 December 2023.
- Brooks, Cleanth and Warren, Robert Penn. 1958. Understanding Fiction (2nd Edition), New York. Appleton-Century-Crofts, Library of Congress Card Number: 59-12844
- Gabler, Neal. 1989. "Nothing Fails Like Success: IRWIN SHAW: A Biography." The Los Angeles Times, October 22, 1989. https://www.latimes.com/archives/la-xpm-1989-10-22-bk-742-story.html Retrieved 15 December 2023
- Michaud, Jon. 2010. "Eighty-Five from the Archive: Irwin Shaw." The New Yorker, March 30, 2010.https://www.newyorker.com/books/double-take/eighty-five-from-the-archive-irwin-shaw
- Mitgang, Herbert. 1984. "IRWIN SHAW, EXTOLLED FOR SHORT STORIES, DIES" The New York Times, May 17, 1984.https://www.nytimes.com/1984/05/17/obituaries/irwin-shaw-extolled-for-short-stories-dies.html Retrieved 13 December 2023.
- Rosenfeld, Isaac. 1956. "Left-Wing Middle-Brow: Act of Faith and Other Stories" Commentary, November 1956. https://www.commentary.org/articles/isaac-rosenfeld/act-of-faith-and-other-stories-by-irwin-shaw/aac Retrieved 15 December 2023.
- Shaw, Irwin. 1954. Selected Short Stories of Irwin Shaw. Modern Library, New York. Library of Congress Catalog Number: 61-10674
- Shnayerson, Michael. 1989. Irwin Shaw: A Biography. G. P. Putnam's Sons, New York. ISBN 0-399-13443-3
