= The Eighty-Yard Run =

- Short story by Irwin Shaw
- Country: United States
- Language: English

Publication
- Published in: Esquire
- Publication date: January 1941

"The Eighty-Yard Run" is a work of short fiction by Irwin Shaw, originally published in Esquire (January 1941) and first collected in Welcome to the City and Other Stories (1942) by Random House.

The story is one of Shaw’s highly regarded and most anthologized works.

== Plot ==
The story is written in the third-person limited omniscient, with Christian Darling as the focal character. Christian is 35-year-old and has been married to his wife Louise since they graduated from college. He has in recent years begun drinking. Christian works as a traveling men’s garment salesman. Louise has developed her career as an editor of a fashionable magazine and socializes with impressive figures from the world of fine art and literature. She has extramarital affairs and addresses Christian affectionately with the diminutive "Baby." Louise’s earnings maintains the couple’s luxury lifestyle.

Alienated from his wife’s liberal set and sensing his own relative decline, he sustains himself by the memory of his college football days. At the age of 20, he had returned a pass for 80 yards, an event that has emerged in his memory as an enormous athletic and social triumph. The reception was only in a practice game with his own team members, and he never actually achieved any real success as a college receiver. The story closes with his visit to the old football field. In the twilight, he attempts to duplicate the glory run he had made as a youth. Exhausted at the goal line, he startles a boy and girl making out on the turf. Embarrassed, Christian attempts to justify his behavior: "I —once I played here." He quickly retreats to his hotel.

== Critical appraisal ==
Literary critic James R. Giles reports that a number of Shaw’s stories "rank with the most distinguished American short fiction, including 'The Eighty-Yard Run.'" He offers "The Eighty-Yard Run" as "an example of Shaw’s craft at its flawless peak." Critic Bart Barnes in The Washington Post calls "The Eighty-Yard Run" among Shaw’s "very best stories." Author and editor Willie Morris recalls reading "The Eighty-Yard Run" as a sixth-grader and considers it "probably my first true introduction to great writing." The story inspired him to pursue a career in literature.

Literary critic Nasrullah Manmbrol writes:

"The Eighty-Yard Run" contains subtleties and depths that remain underappreciated. Shaw, often dismissed as a popular novelist, has yet to receive his critical due even for his best work, including this story.

== Theme ==
The focal character, Christian Darling, approaches middle-age with only the memory of his fame as a college football player as solace - a fame which he inflates in order to sustain himself as both his personal and professional life deteriorates. The contrast between Christian’s arrested maturation—his wife Louise addresses him as "baby"—and her development of a professional career and social relationships, form a central thematic element. Shaw augments this contrast with the "innocence" of Christian’s Midwest roots and his alienation in New York City - "a center of sophisticated sexual, artistic and political experience."

In an interview with Liz Drivan in 1978, Shaw explained the thematic elements in the story:

I’ve noticed, as an old athlete myself, that as athletes get older they remember most vividly the days when they ran first, when they felt invulnerable, and the whole world seemed to be in their lap…that’s what the story is about. Also it’s an allegory. It’s a symbol for America, because it begins in the boom times of the 1920s when Americans were thinking they were sitting on top of the world and nothing could stop them, and then the plunge into the Depression...

== Sources ==
- Barnes, Bart. 1984. "Irwin Shaw, 71, Prolific American Writer, Dies." The Washington Post, May 17, 1984. https://www.washingtonpost.com/archive/local/1984/05/17/irwin-shaw-71-prolific-american-writer-dies/d55783d9-1709-417e-9640-609cc78a4e57/ Retrieved 15 December 2023.
- Giles, James R.. 1983. Irwin Shaw. Twayne Publishers, Boston, Massachusetts. G. K. Hall & Co.. ISBN 0-8057-7382-7
- Mambrol, Nassrullah. 2021. "Analysis of Irwin Shaw’s The Eighty-Yard Run" Literary Theory and Criticism. Literariness, May 23, 2021. Analysis of Irwin Shaw’s The Eighty-Yard Run Retrieved 16 December 2023.
- Mitgang, Herbert. 1984. "IRWIN SHAW, EXTOLLED FOR SHORT STORIES, DIES" The New York Times, May 17, 1984.https://www.nytimes.com/1984/05/17/obituaries/irwin-shaw-extolled-for-short-stories-dies.html Retrieved 13 December 2023.
- Shaw, Irwin. 1954. Selected Short Stories of Irwin Shaw. The Modern Library, New York. pp. 2–17 Library of Congress Catalog Number: 61-10674
- Shnayerson, Michael. 1989. Irwin Shaw: A Biography. G. P. Putnam’s Sons, New York. ISBN 0-399-13443-3
