= Why the South Lost the Civil War =

Why the South Lost the Civil War is a 1986 non-fiction book by Richard E. Beringer, Herman Hattaway, Archer Jones, and William L. Still, published by the University of Georgia Press.

It described what the authors say are the reasons why the Confederate States of America collapsed during the American Civil War. The authors argue that the kind of nationalism used in the CSA was the primary culprit.

Herbert Mitgang, in The New York Times, stated that the title suggested that the states rights argument is invalid, and that attitudes were changing towards the Confederacy in Southern academia.

== Background ==
The authors read existing secondary sources and conducted their own original research. The research dated from circa 1966 to the point of publishing. The authors originally were going to have separate essays examining each purported cause of the failure of the CSA, but they chose to have the information in a single essay. Two of the authors had previously co-written How the North Won, and some of the information from that book is in this one.

== Content ==
The first and second parts of the book discuss reasons for the loss of the CSA. The book critiques earlier theories on why the Confederacy collapsed, as well as earlier Civil War scholarship in general. The book argues that the issues in the Southern economy did not primarily damage the military but instead damaged civilian life. In one chapter, it argued that the blockade by the Union damaged civilian morale but did not significantly affect supplies for the military. The book also states that the federal government of the Confederacy had more power than that of the Union, and that the idea that "states' rights" damaged the Confederacy is not valid.

The authors use writings by Carl von Clausewitz and Antoine-Henri Jomini, two military theorists, to criticize the idea that the Southerners chose the wrong military strategy while the Northerners chose the correct one. The authors argued that other historians had not properly interpreted the ideas of those theorists.

The book argued that the CSA never sufficiently developed a sense of separate nationhood, citing its reverence of the U.S. Founding Fathers, as well as having a common culture, language, and political structure. The book argues that the population did not have a fervent belief in continuing the war. Military losses resulted in Southerners believing that God disapproved of the CSA's actions. Additionally, it argued that the Southern population had more of a lack of unity than that of the North.

They use actions by Joseph E. Brown and Zebulon Vance in their statements against the idea that states' rights were a factor in the CSA's collapse.

The third and fourth parts describe the military outcomes.

The fifth part has a summary of the whole book.

The authors also argued that slavery was destined to collapse even if the South won the war, and the authors used the fact that the CSA was going to give weapons to some slaves as evidence that the CSA was moving in the direction of ending slavery.

== Reception ==
Robert K. Krick of Fredericksburg and Spotsylvania National Military Park stated that the book became "one of the most widely discussed books of recent decades on the Civil War", citing how it was "inevitably interesting and provocative".

=== Reviews ===
Reviewer David L. Carlton stated that the writers "effectively" show that the military was not the reason why the CSA collapsed. As for the main argument, the reviewer argued it was ultimately "deeply frustrating" due to a "noticeably weak" explanation against the idea that economic reasons did the CSA in. Additionally, the reviewer argues that the conclusion that the CSA was moving to end slavery was wrong and that the writers "mistake the oft-expressed penitence of the pious for their failure to be good masters for repentance that they had been masters at all."

Joseph G. Dawson III of Texas A&M University stated that the author's arguments were "interesting but not always convincing", and that they were "not as persuasive" compared to those in Why the North Won the Civil War.

David Herbert Donald argued that the integration of the new research was "impressive" and that their arguments were "admirable". Donald argued that the main idea was not properly argued in the single esay, and that he felt that there was not enough evidence to back up the main idea.

J. Walter High of Drexel University praised the book for promoting further debate and analysis on why the CSA failed.

Krick argued that the work is "unfailingly interesting and provoking", and he argued that the work successfully argued against the idea that poor military strategy doomed the CSA. He felt some arguments "will strike many readers as palpably foolish" and some others were unconvincing. Krick felt that the explanation citing Clausewitz and Jomini was "brilliant". Krick however argued that having multiple writers confused some points and that some statistics were misused.

James L. Morrison of York College of Pennsylvania argued that the book is "an important historiographical survey" and "a major contribution to" its field, arguing that the techniques used in the book were "imaginative".

John David Smith of North Carolina State University argued that the work is "provocative" and "immensely useful", and that the authors were respectful towards colleagues who they disagreed with. He agreed with the thesis on how Confederate nationalism did not work, but he argued that the statements about states rights not having an effect on the Confederacy, as well as the book arguing that White residents of the CSA slavery felt guilty over it, were "less convincing".

Reviewer Michael Witowski described the book as "well-researched and thorough" as well as "extremely well organized".

Reviewer P.K. stated that the main idea was "interesting" but criticized repetition and too much focus on being "academicians rather than historians."
