= Welcome to the City and Other Stories =

Book by Irwin Shaw

- First edition
- Author: Irwin Shaw
- Language: English
- Publisher: Random House
- Publication date: 1942
- Publication place: United States
- Media type: Print (hardback)
- Pages: 269
- OCLC: 1930658

Welcome to the City and Other Stories is a collection of short fiction by Irwin Shaw published by Random House in 1942.

== Stories ==
- "The City Was in Total Darkness" (The New Yorker, August 30, 1941)
- "Main Currents in American Thought" (The New Yorker, August 5, 1939)
- "God on Friday Night"
- "The Eighty-Yard Run" (Esquire, January 1941)
- "Welcome to the City" (The New Yorker, January 17, 1942)
- "Free Conscience, Void of Offense" (The New Yorker, July 27, 1940)
- "Material Witness" (The New Yorker, February 1, 1941)
- "The House of Pain" (Esquire, November 1940)
- "Triumph of Justice" (Esquire, December 1940)
- "Night, Birth and Opinion"
- "Search Through the Streets of the City" (The New Yorker, August 2, 1941)
- "Select Clientele" (The New Yorker, August 17, 1940)
- "The Indian in Depth of Night" (Story)
- "It Happened in Rochester" (Esquire, December 1939)
- "The Dry Rock" (The New Yorker, May 31, 1941)
- "Prize for Promise"
- "Lemkau, Pogran and Blaufox" (The New Yorker, December 30, 1939)
- "Dinner in a Good Restaurant"
- "The Lament of Madame Reshevsky"
- "Pattern of Love"

== Reception ==
Biographer Michael Shnayerson reports that the collection was "overwhelmingly" acclaimed by critics when it first appeared confirming Shaw's reputation as an outstanding American writer.

New York Herald Tribune reviewer H. N. Doughty praised the "warmth of feeling, the heart, the humanity" that characterized the stories in the volume.

Though acknowledging Shaw's "rich understanding and superb technique," Time magazine cautioned that he "lays it on too thick or too pat…Tricks of overemphasis, which get by on stage, look as uneasy in print as theatrical makeup does in a living room."

== Theme ==
By the mid-1930s, Shaw's short fiction was appearing frequently in the major literary journals of the day, among these Esquire, Collier's, Harper's and The New Yorker: "By 1948, he had contributed so regularly to the latter that he was regarded as one of the most prominent of a group known as The New Yorker writers."

The stories in Shaw's first two collections of fiction focus on the working class who suffered in the aftermath of the panic of 1929 and the devastating effects of the Great Depression.

Shaw's themes in Welcome to the City are largely those of the political Left in the United States at this time—identifying capitalism as a system destructive and degrading to the masses, and sympathetic to socialism. The stories, however, do not emerge as overt propaganda, but as literary art. Giles adds that the title of Shaws' second volume of short fiction makes this explicit, and remained so until 1951, when Shaw became as an expatriate in Paris for the next 25 years.

== Sources ==
- Giles, James R.. 1983. Irwin Shaw. Twayne Publishers, Boston, Massachusetts. G. K. Hall & Co.. ISBN 0-8057-7382-7
- Giles, James Richard. 1991. Irwin Shaw: A Study of the Short Fiction. Twayne Publishers, Boston, Massachusetts. G. K. Hall & Co. ISBN 0-8057-8331-8
- Shaw, Irwin. 1942. Welcome to the City. Random House, New York. Library of Congress Catalog Number 1930658
- Shnayerson, Michael. 1989. Irwin Shaw: A Biography. G. P. Putnam's Sons, New York. ISBN 0-399-13443-3
