= Lucy Crown =

1956 novel by Irwin Shaw

- First edition
- Author: Irwin Shaw
- Language: English
- Publisher: Random House
- Publication date: March 30, 1956
- Publication place: United States
- Media type: Print (Hardback)
- Pages: 339
- OCLC: 256837355
- Preceded by: The Troubled Air

Lucy Crown is a novel by American author Irwin Shaw. First published in 1956 by Random House, it was Shaw's third novel, following The Young Lions and The Troubled Air.

== Principal characters ==
- Lucy Crown, wife and mother
- Oliver Crown, her husband
- Anthony (Tony) Crown, their son
- Jeffrey Bunner, Lucy's lover

== Plot summary ==
Lucy, an orphan, marries Oliver, a successful but frustrated businessman. Oliver's ambitions are thwarted when his father dies and Oliver is forced to run the family business. He proves to be a controlling husband. Lucy, who suffers from self-esteem issues, is intimidated by him and gives up her career aspirations.

In the summer of 1937, Oliver leaves Lucy (now age 35) and son Tony (age 13) alone at a lake resort for several weeks while he attends to business. During Oliver's absence Lucy is pursued by Jeffrey, a Dartmouth College undergraduate they have hired to be a companion for Tony. She resists Jeffrey's advances but they eventually begin what Lucy regards as a casual affair. Tony sees them having intercourse and tells his father, who confronts the couple. Lucy and Oliver remain married, but she insists that she will have nothing further to do with her son. Tony becomes embittered and cuts off all contact with his mother. Lucy's deliberate act of infidelity and betrayal leads to the disintegration of her marriage and complete estrangement from her son.

During World War II, Tony is unable to serve in the military due to poor health. Oliver joins the U.S. Army and is away from home for several years. Lucy embarks on a series of affairs with other men during Oliver's absence. Before leaving for combat in Europe, a despondent Oliver attempts to explain his frustrations and unhappiness to his son:

″You reach a certain age, say twenty-five, thirty, it varies with your intelligence, and you begin to say, “Oh, Christ, this is for nothing. You begin to realize it’s just more of the same, only getting worse every day... I used to have a high opinion of myself... and then, in fifteen minutes in a little stinking summer resort beside a lake, the whole thing collapsed.″

A decade after the war is over, Lucy (now aged 60) visits Paris and unexpectedly encounters her son. She learns that he is married with a son, is living in Paris and is working as a cartoon artist. She immediately sees through his façade and realizes that, while keeping up appearances, he is leading an unhappy life. She attempts to explain to Tony why her marriage with Oliver failed:

″Your father was a passionate and disappointed man. When he was young, he had high hopes for himself ...he saw himself as a nobody, a failure and all the passion and disappointment of his life he centered on me. He frightened me and he expected too much from me and he directed every move of my life and a good deal of the time he didn’t satisfy me... I was timid and uncertain and vengeful and I had a low opinion of myself, so I went out looking for a good opinion of myself in the arms of other men. At first I told myself I was looking for love, but it wasn't so. I didn't find love and I didn't find a good opinion. And it wasn't as though I didn't try.″

Together Lucy and Tony visit the French village where Oliver was killed in combat during the war. This eventually leads to a partial reconciliation of mother and son.

== Critical reception ==
When Oliver Crown discovers that his wife Lucy has been unfaithful, he turns to the works of Shakespeare for solace. Rather, he encounters this passage in The Winter’s Tale (1623):

Should all despair,...

That have revolted wives, the tenth of mankind

Would hang themselves. Physic it ‘t, there’s none.

It is a bawdy planet.

A number of critics felt that the novel was not up to the standard of Shaw's past work. Among their objections were that the plot was less than credible, the characters underdeveloped and the subject matter mundane compared with the social issues Shaw had treated in his earlier writing. Literary critic James R. Giles offers this critique:

More than one critic has commented that the tone of Lucy Crown is marred by an aesthetically incongruous bitterness. Certainly, it is the one Shaw novel in which the writing sometimes feels forced and unnatural. Shaw, in fact, encountered more difficulties in writing it than in any of his other novels.

Also coloring the critics' assessment was the growing perception that Shaw had chosen to sacrifice literary acclaim for commercial success, and had retreated from the idealistic left-wing sentiments expressed in his earliest work. Fueling this concern, prior to publication Shaw was paid $400,000 for the screen rights while the novel was still in a pre-published manuscript by Hecht-Lancaster Productions. In addition, he was a percentage of the profits on the film. Burt Lancaster was designated to play the role of Oliver Crown.

Critic James Kelly in the Saturday Review noted that the novel tackles moral dilemmas such as whether an intelligent woman should allow herself to be stifled by her husband; whether adultery is a form of rebellion; and whether a child should be forced to bear the full price of a parent's infidelity. Kirkus Reviews found the novel bleak but praised Shaw for his storytelling talent.

== Sources ==
- Giles, James R.. 1983. Irwin Shaw. Twayne Publishers, Boston, Massachusetts. G. K. Hall & Co. ISBN 0-8057-7382-7
- Giles, James R. 1991. Irwin Shaw: A Study of the Short Fiction. Twayne Publishers, Boston, Massachusetts. G. K. Hall & Co. ISBN 0-8057-7382-7
- Shaw, Irwin. 1956. Lucy Crown. Random House, New York. ISBN 978-0451014382
- Shnayerson, Michael. 1989. Irwin Shaw: A Biography. G. P. Putnam’s Sons, New York. ISBN 0-399-13443-3
