= Act of Faith and Other Stories =

1946 short story collection by Irwin Shaw

- First edition
- Author: Irwin Shaw
- Language: English
- Publisher: Random House
- Publication date: 1946
- Publication place: United States
- Media type: Print (hardback)
- Pages: 212
- ISBN: 978-1299930919

Act of Faith and Other Stories is a collection of short fiction by Irwin Shaw, published by Random House in 1946.

Shaw's third collection of short stories, this volume deals largely with incidents related to World War II.

The frequently anthologized title story, "Act of Faith," was included in O. Henry Prize Stories of 1946 and in The Best American Short Stories of 1947. "Act of Faith" was also included in The New Yorker's own anthology of war stories, Book of War Pieces (1947).

== Stories ==
- "Preach on the Dusty Roads" (The New Yorker, August 22, 1942)
- "Faith at Sea" (The New Yorker, May 15, 1943)
- "Gunners' Passage" (The New Yorker, July 22, 1944)
- "Walking Wounded" (The New Yorker, May 13, 1944)
- "Hamlets of the World"
- "Retreat"
- "Part in a Play"
- "The Priest" (The New Yorker, April 7, 1945)
- "Night in Algiers" (The New Yorker, September 25, 1943)
- "Medal from Jerusalem"
- "The Veterans Reflect"
- "Act of Faith" (The New Yorker, February 2, 1946)

== Reception ==
The Atlantic in the November 1946 issue describes the volume as "twelve masterful short stories...brief, compact, and poignant" concerning men and women overseas during World War II. The reviewer adds that the influence of Hemingway is apparent in the dialogue and the restrained and economical writing that advance the dramatic narratives. Biographer Michael Shnayerson reports that critical assessment for the collection was positive, with Shaw widely identified as "one of America's best short story writers." He cites New York Times critic Robert Gorman Davis, who wrote (August 26, 1946): "Irwin Shaw is a moral writer who conceives moral problems simply, feels them deeply, and dramatizes them with an often terrifying historical significance."

== Critical appraisal ==
Literary critic James R. Giles observes that "Shaw's publishers for most of his career have recognized the central importance of his short stories in any evaluation of his career." In particular, Act of Faith and Other Stories includes "memorable tales of war."

Biographer Michael Shnayerson offers this high praise for the collection's title piece: "'Act of Faith' remains one of Shaw's best stories, arguably the finest of those about the war."

== Theme ==
Literary critic William Peden in Saturday Review notes that Shaw's finest short fiction is derived from his experiences as a warrant officer in the U.S. Army during World War II. The stories deal primarily with the "effects of war, violence and intolerance." Peden singles out "Gunners' Passage" as "eloquent in its simplicity and revealing in its understanding of simple men of good will in a violent world." James R. Giles writes that thematically, the works of fiction in Act of Faith do not encompass reconciliation with those who carried out the orders of the Nazi Party leadership.

In "Retreat," Shaw dramatizes an encounter between a German officer of the defeated Weimar army who is fleeing Paris, and a Partisan Jew who has managed to survive the occupation. Giles describes the following exchange, in which the officer, captured by the Jew, identifies himself as merely a former automobile salesman, explaining that any atrocities were committed exclusively SS and Gestapo units, for which he is not responsible. The officer pleads: "What can I do...to wash my hands?" The Jew answers "You can cut your throat...and see if it takes the stain out." Giles adds this caveat:

Shaw recognizes that the Germans did not invent prejudice against his people and that he equally condemns anti-Semitism in the Russians, the British, and the Americans.

== Sources ==
- The Atlantic. 1946. Act of Faith and Other Stories. The Atlantic, November,1946.https://cdn.theatlantic.com/media/archives/1946/11/178-5/132324856.pdf
- Giles, James Richard. 1983. Irwin Shaw. Twayne Publishers, Boston, Massachusetts. G. K. Hall & Co. ISBN 0-8057-7382-7
- Giles, James Richard. 1991. Irwin Shaw: A Study of the Short Fiction. Twayne Publishers, Boston, Massachusetts. G. K. Hall & Co. ISBN 0-8057-8331-8
- Peden, William. 1950. "Best of Irwin Shaw" Saturday Review, November 1950 in Irwin Shaw: A Study of the Short Fiction. Twayne Publishers, Boston, Massachusetts. G. K. Hall & Co. p. 184-185 ISBN 0-8057-8331-8
- Shaw, Irwin. 1946. Act of Faith and Other Stories. Random House, New York. ISBN 9780836940244
- Shnayerson, Michael. 1989. Irwin Shaw: A Biography. G. P. Putnam's Sons, New York. Gordon Weaver, editor. ISBN 0-399-13443-3
