= The Troubled Air =

Novel by Irwin Shaw

- Author: Irwin Shaw
- Language: English
- Set in: New York City
- Publisher: Random House
- Publication date: 1951
- Publication place: United States
- Preceded by: The Young Lions
- Followed by: Lucy Crown

The Troubled Air is a novel by Irwin Shaw first published in 1951. It is a story of the radio industry (at a time when shows were produced live) set in 1950, during the blacklisting of McCarthyism.

== Plot summary ==
The plot centers around Clement Archer, the director of a successful weekly radio program, who is told by the producers and sponsors to fire four actors and one musician working on the show because of alleged Communist sympathizing. To save the show, and because of his own conscience, Archer wins a two-week deferral and starts his own investigation. Eventually, one of the contributors commits suicide, two of the others betray Archer, and the careers of all others are ruined. Archer reconciles with his family.

== Background ==
For the novel, Shaw draws on his own experiences in working for the radio with Himan Brown. Matching a sub-plot of the novel, Shaw was named as a Communist in 1951 by the right-wing pamphlet Red Channels "because he signed a petition calling on the US Congress to review the convictions of fellow screenwriters Dalton Trumbo and John Howard Lawson". Neither House Un-American Activities Committee nor Senator McCarthy are explicitly mentioned in the novel. According to Shaw himself, he "wanted to show the decent and average American faced with social pressures of which he doesn’t approve".
