= Quiet City (music) =

Composition for trumpet, English horn, and strings by Aaron Copland

Quiet City is a composition for trumpet, cor anglais or oboe, and string orchestra by Aaron Copland. In the published score, the composer indicates "use Oboe only if no English Horn is available."

== History ==
In 1939, Copland wrote incidental music for the play Quiet City by Irwin Shaw. He later worked some of it into a ten-minute composition designed to be performed independently of the play. The piece premiered on January 28, 1941, by conductor Daniel Saidenberg and his Saidenberg Little Symphony in New York City.

The original score for the play was composed for trumpet, alto saxophone, B♭ clarinet (doubling bass clarinet), and piano.

For a 1941 Boston Symphony performance, the composer wrote:

In the Spring of 1939 I was asked by my friend, Harold Clurman, director of the Group Theatre, to supply the incidental musical score for a new play by Irwin Shaw, author of 'Bury the Dead,' 'Gentle People,' and other dramas his new opus was entitled 'Quiet City,' and was a realistic fantasy concerning the night-thoughts of many different kinds of people in a great city. It called for music evocative of the nostalgia and inner distress of a society profoundly aware of its own insecurity. The author's mouthpiece was a young trumpet player called David Mellnikoff, whose trumpet playing helped to arouse the conscience of his fellow-players and of the audience. The play was given two 'try-out' performances in New York on successive Sunday evenings in April of 1939, and then withdrawn for revisions. Several friends urged me to make use of some of the thematic material used in my [stage] score as the basis for an orchestral piece. This is what I did in the summer of 1940, as soon as my duties at the Berkshire Music Center were finished. I borrowed the name, the trumpet, and some of the themes from the original play. The addition of English horn and string orchestra (I was limited to clarinet, saxophone, piano, plus the trumpet of course, in the stage version), and the form of the piece as a whole, was the result of work in a barn-studio two miles down the road from Tanglewood. The orchestration was completed in late September, and the score dedicated to Ralph Hawkes, junior member of the London firm of Boosey and Hawkes, who published the composition recently.

According to Copland, the piece was "an attempt to mirror the troubled main character of Irwin Shaw's play", who had abandoned his Jewishness and his poetic aspirations in order to pursue material success by anglicizing his name, marrying a rich socialite, and becoming the president of a department store. The man, however, was continually recalled to his conscience by the haunting sound of his brother's trumpet playing. Continuing the assessment in his own autobiography, Copland observed that "Quiet City seems to have become a musical entity, superseding the original reasons for its composition", owing much of its success to its escape from the details of its dramatic context.
