= The Young Lions (film) =

1958 film

- Theatrical release poster
- Directed by: Edward Dmytryk
- Screenplay by: Edward Anhalt
- Based on: The Young Lions by Irwin Shaw
- Produced by: Al Lichtman
- Starring: Marlon Brando; Montgomery Clift; Dean Martin; Hope Lange; Barbara Rush; May Britt
- Cinematography: Joseph MacDonald
- Edited by: Dorothy Spencer
- Music by: Hugo Friedhofer
- Distributed by: 20th Century-Fox
- Release date: April 2, 1958
- Running time: 167 minutes
- Country: United States
- Language: English
- Budget: $3.55 million
- Box office: $4.48 million (US/ Canada rentals)

The Young Lions is a 1958 American epic war drama film directed by Edward Dmytryk and starring Marlon Brando, Montgomery Clift, and Dean Martin. It was made in black-and-white and CinemaScope and was theatrically released by 20th Century-Fox. The film is based on the 1948 novel of the same name by Irwin Shaw.

== Plot ==
German ski instructor Christian Diestl is hopeful that Adolf Hitler will bring new prosperity and social mobility to Germany, so when war breaks out he joins the army, becoming a lieutenant. Dissatisfied with police duty in Paris, he requests to be transferred and is assigned to the North African campaign front. While there, he sees what the war has done to his captain and the captain's wife, and he is sickened by their behavior.

Michael Whiteacre and Noah Ackerman befriend each other during their U.S. Army draft physical examination. Michael is in show business and romantically involved with American socialite Margaret Freemantle, who dated ski instructor Christian in 1938 while both were in the Bavarian Alps, where she spent her skiing vacation. Upset by his convictions, she left him on New Year's Eve and returned to Michael.

Noah works as a junior department store clerk, and attends a party that Michael throws, where he meets Hope Plowman. Noah falls in love with Hope, declaring that he wants to marry her. Hope invites Noah to her provincial hometown in Vermont, where she intends introducing him to her father. At the last moment, Hope tells her father that Noah is Jewish. Her father is unprepared for the idea of having a Jewish son-in-law — he has never known a Jew. After speaking with Noah, Hope's father approves of him.

Noah and Michael enter the Army on the same day, and attend basic training together. Their commanding officer and some of the men in their boot camp platoon bully Noah and demonstrate antagonism toward him. Noah gains their respect by standing up to them, even though he's much smaller and is badly hurt in fistfights with some of them. Military authorities, however, discover Noah's put-upon situation and court-martial the officer.

Michael is posted overseas to London.

Christian is conflicted, hating what the war has done to his fellow Germans, but unable to escape from his role in the conflict. He despises what his fellow soldiers have done in the name of the Fatherland, but is determined to fulfill his duty to the end. While visiting his seriously wounded captain in a hospital, he is duped into bringing him a bayonet. He later learns from the captain's wife that he committed suicide with it.

Thanks to his fame, Michael spends most of the war in a safe job in London, nowhere near the fighting. He finally decides to volunteer for combat after Margaret shames him into action. By pulling strings, he rejoins his old outfit at the front, in Germany, in the final days of the war. He reunites with Noah there.

Noah risks his own life during combat by swimming across a canal to save a fellow soldier. The soldier is one of the men who abused him in boot camp. Christian discovers the reality of the Third Reich when he stumbles upon a concentration camp and hears the commander talk about the mass exterminations. Shortly afterwards, the camp is liberated by American forces, which include Michael and Noah. The mayor of a nearby town offers working parties of his constituents to "clean up" the camp before American reporters and photographers arrive. He is roughly rebuffed by Captain Green after an imprisoned rabbi asks Green for permission to hold a religious service and the mayor protests.

Seeing how Noah is affected by the camp, Green instructs him to take a walk and sends Michael with him. Nearby, dazed and tired, Christian screams in rage, breaking apart his machine-pistol on a tree-stump. The noise draws the attention of Michael and Noah, and seeing the German, Michael shoots Christian. They silently watch him die, then quietly walk back to the camp.

After the war, a discharged Noah emerges from a subway station. Hope is at a window in their apartment and notices him coming, and lifts up their baby daughter for him to finally see, and he ascends the stairs quickly to embrace his family.

== Cast ==
- Marlon Brando as Christian Diestl
- Montgomery Clift as Noah Ackerman
- Dean Martin as Michael Whiteacre
- Hope Lange as Hope Plowman
- Barbara Rush as Margaret Freemantle
- May Britt as Gretchen Hardenberg
- Maximilian Schell as Captain Hardenberg
- Dora Doll as Simone
- Lee Van Cleef as Sergeant Rickett
- Liliane Montevecchi as Françoise
- Parley Baer as Brandt
- Arthur Franz as Lieutenant Green
- Hal Baylor as Private Burnecker
- Richard Gardner as Private Cowley
- Herbert Rudley as Captain Colclough
- John Banner as Mayor of German Town
- L. Q. Jones as Private Donnelly (uncredited)

== Production ==
The film became a box office success and was the key to Martin's comeback in the wake of his split with partner Jerry Lewis. Tony Randall originally had Martin's role, but was replaced after talent agency MCA suggested to director Dmytryk to replace Randall. Clift at first was opposed to Martin, but changed his mind after seeing Randall in Oh, Men! Oh, Women!. Martin, after the failure of his previous movie, accepted $20,000 to star, which was less than he made in a single week of nightclub appearances at the time. The change provoked a mild controversy with rumors circulating that MCA, which represented Brando, Clift, and Martin, had bullied Twentieth-Century Fox, threatening to withhold Brando and Clift. Martin ended up receiving splendid reviews and launched a very successful solo career as an actor.

This was the only film that Brando and Clift made together. However, they do not appear in any scenes together (the scene with Martin and Clift standing over the body of Brando's dead character does not have all three actors in the same frame and Martin's and Clift's scene was filmed at a different time than that of Brando's). The picture was produced by Al Lichtman who died shortly before its release. It was nominated for a BAFTA Award for Best Film. It was also nominated in 1959 for three Academy Awards for Best Cinematography, Best Sound (Carlton W. Faulkner), and Best Music.

The film made some major changes to the original story of Shaw's novel. In the film version, the character of the German soldier Christian is portrayed more sympathetically as a decent man who is deceived, rather than seduced and corrupted, by his country's Nazi rulers. Although the novel's character is increasingly hardened by his experiences and unrepentant to the end, in the film version he grows ever more disillusioned and renounces his cause in the final scenes. Another major difference is that in the novel's final confrontation, Christian ambushes the two American soldiers, firing first and killing Noah and then being killed in turn by Michael; in the film, Christian, having thrown away his weapon after witnessing the horrors of a concentration camp, stumbles dazedly into the path of the two GIs and is shot dead on sight. As Bosley Crowther wrote in The New York Times in 1958 in a review of the film, the screen version is "prettier" than the novel and in the former, there is "no noticeable moral difference between the one German and two Americans".

Shaw himself is said to have disliked the changes to his novel in the film version, in particular Brando's sympathetic portrayal of Christian and the playing down of the anti-Semitism that Noah encounters in the original book.

== Release ==
=== Critical reception ===
The Young Lions was well received by film critics. Film review aggregator website Rotten Tomatoes reports that 75% of 8 critics gave the film a positive review. Bosley Crowther of The New York Times, however, gave the film an unfavorable review, calling Marlon Brando's German accent reminiscent of the old vaudeville comedy team Weber and Fields; Montgomery Clift's performance "lackluster"; and the movie as a whole "a formless mosaic". Abel Green of Variety gave the film a positive review, and succinctly summarized the film as "a blockbuster," noting "The Young Lions is a canvas of World War II of scope and stature that gives accent anew to the observation that television's competition is still, fundamentally, a peepshow.... It's a king-sized credit to all concerned, from Edward Anhalt's skillful adaptation of Irwin Shaw's novel to Edward Dmytryk's realistic direction and, not the least the highly competent portrayals of virtually everyone in the cast".

Stanley Kauffmann of The New Republic wrote,

Under Edward Dmytryk's direction the film weaves, moderately skillfully, the stories of the two Americans and the German until their paths cross outside a concentration camp at the war's end. There the nervous, cowardly Whitacre shoots the unarmed Diestl. The film's basic flaw is in the assumption that by combining three stories that would otherwise be commonplace, you will produce an epic; and the finish crowns its superficiality with pointlessness. Some of the scenes are good setpieces, but we soon sense that the film's honesty and intelligence are thin. It becomes just another mildly competent war picture, more complicated than most. Yet it is worth seeing because of Brando's performance.

The Japanese filmmaker Akira Kurosawa cited this movie as one of his 100 favorite films.

=== Box office ===
The film was a box office success. It opened at number two at the US box office behind The Bridge on the River Kwai with a gross of $420,000 from the cities sampled by Variety. It went on to take $4,480,000 in theatrical rentals in the United States and Canada. It was the highest-grossing film in Greece for the 1958–59 season with admissions of 148,418.

== Bibliography ==
- Tosches, Nick (1992). Dino: Living High in the Dirty Business of Dreams. New York, New York: Dell Publishing. ISBN 978-0-385-33429-7.
