= M. C. Levee =

American film producer

Michael C. Levee
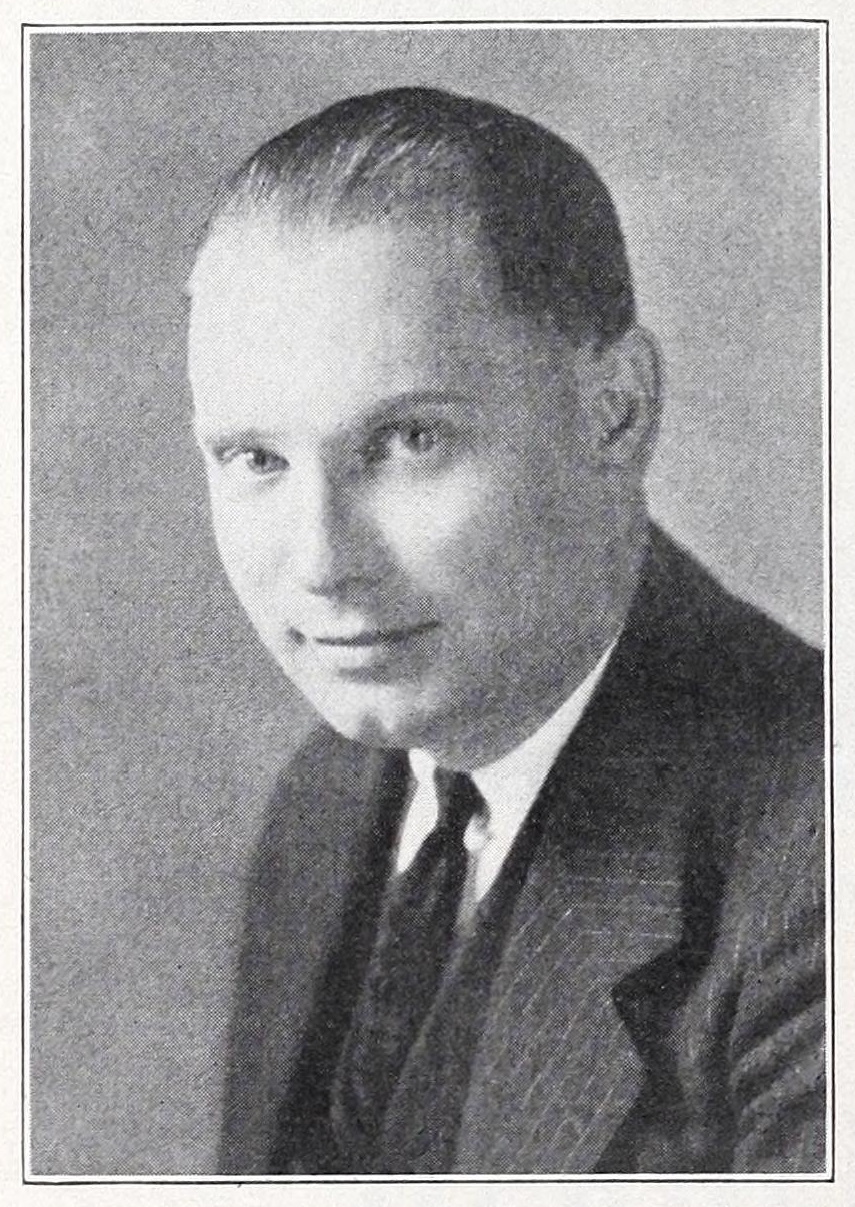
- Portrait of Michael C. Levee, published in 1924
- Born: Michael Charles Levee; January 18, 1891; Chicago, Illinois, USA
- Died: May 24, 1972 (aged 81); Palm Springs, California, US
- Occupations: Motion picture industry executive; studio manager
- Title: Third president of the Academy of Motion Picture Arts and Sciences, Honorary Life Member of Artists Management Guild, founder of the M. C. Levee Agency, co-founder of the Academy of Motion Picture Arts and Sciences, founder and first President of Artists Management Guild
- Spouses: Rose "Mimi" Hirschkowitz (m. 1914) Trudy Feltman (m. 1958)
- Children: John Levee, Michael Levee Jr.

Michael Charles Levee (aka M. C. Levee) (January 18, 1891 – May 24, 1972) was an American film executive, film producer and founder of the M. C. Levee Agency in Hollywood.

Beginning his career as a prop man, Levee worked his way up to an executive at several different film studios, including First National Pictures, United Artists Studios, and Paramount Pictures.

Levee was one of the original 36 founding members of the Academy of Motion Picture Arts and Sciences (AMPAS) and served as its third president from 1931 to 1932. He was also one of Hollywood's top talent agents until his retirement in 1956, working with such stars as Mary Pickford and Joan Crawford.

== Personal life ==
Levee was one of six children growing up in Chicago. He had four brothers named Louis, George, Eddie and Sidney and a sister named Rose Levee. Levee was married to Rose "Mimi" Hirschkowitz on November 11, 1914, and they had two sons. The elder, Michael Levee Jr. (1921-1988), was a talent agent and film producer who served as Vice-President of Radnite-Mattel Productions and worked at the M. C. Levee Agency and at the film division of Mattel Toys. Michael Levee Jr. was married to the artist Barbara Poe Levee.. His younger son, John Levee, was a painter who lived in Paris. M. C. Levee's second marriage was to Trudy Levee in 1958.

He died at the age of 81 from cancer in Palm Springs, California.

== Career ==
Levee began his career in the film industry by working as a prop man at Fox Film Corporation in 1917, earning $20 a week working on A Tale of Two Cities. Within a year, Levee became the assistant to Abe Carles, the General Superintendent at Fox. Levee left Fox in 1920 in order to become a business man at Robert Brunton Studios with Robert Brunton.

In 1920, Levee organized and was President of United Studios, that became Paramount Pictures after being bought in 1926 by Famous Players–Lasky. While working at United Studios, Levee produced or co-produced The Isle of Lost Ships (1923), Ruth of the Range (1923), The White Moth (1924), starring Barbara La Marr, Torment (1924) In Every Woman's Life (1924), Just a Woman (1925) and Sweet Daddies (1926).

In April 1926, Levee sold United Studios to Paramount Pictures. Levee then joined First National, also known as Warner Bros., in order to build more studio facilities in Burbank. Levee joined Nicholas Schenck as General Studio and Business Manager until 1929, when he left to become Executive Manager at Paramount. In 1932, Levee was let go by Sam Jaffe, the General Production Manager, who believed he could cover both jobs. Levee was also the founder and first President of the Artists Management Guild.

In the 1930s Levee started the M.C. Levee Agency directly after working at United Artists. He ran a one-man business, with no staff. He had several important clients, all of which were working under Warner Brothers. Some of Levee's star clients included Mary Pickford, with whom he co-produced her film Secrets in 1933, Joan Crawford, Merle Oberon, Bette Davis, Paul Muni, Jeanette MacDonald, Leslie Howard, Greer Garson, Claude Rains, Dick Powell, and Franchot Tone.

Levee was also the talent agent of film directors Cecil B. DeMille, Frank Borzage, and Mervyn LeRoy. Robert Cowen referred to Levee as being a fair and reliable agent.

== Founding the Academy of Motion Picture Arts and Sciences ==
In 1927, the Academy of Motion Picture Arts and Sciences was founded in order to improve the media industry without receiving government help. The founders knew they could create a stronger industry by establishing unity between all groups such as writers, directors, and technicians. With such exponential growth in American film, the industry also desperately needed a standardization of equipment and techniques. The founders saw that gathering a group of professionals together could create a positive response to the issues facing the industry and so the Academy of Motion Picture Arts and Sciences was born.

Levee was considered one of the fathers of the Academy alongside Douglas Fairbanks, Conrad Nagel, Milton Sills, William C. deMille and Thalberg. Much of the work Levee did for the Academy was for little or no pay, working simply for the good of the Academy. Levee, along with the other 35 founding members had great hope for what the Academy could become for the film industry. They hoped to establish a professional society which might work toward the betterment of the motion picture industry. M.C. Levee believed in the objectives of the academy.

Levee served as treasurer of the Academy for 12 years. He was the founder and President of the Permanent Charities Committee of the film industry, one of the many different organizations created within AMPAS in order to get the view on all sides. In early March 1933, Levee resigned from the Board of Directors of the Academy as a statement that the business was being run into the ground by the studio executives and Wall Street bankers.

== Awards ==
- Honorary Life Member of Artists Management Guild (1958)

Non-profit organization positions
Preceded by William C. deMille	President of the Academy of Motion Picture Arts and Sciences; 1931–1932	Succeeded by Conrad Nagel
