= Ruth of the Range =

1923 film

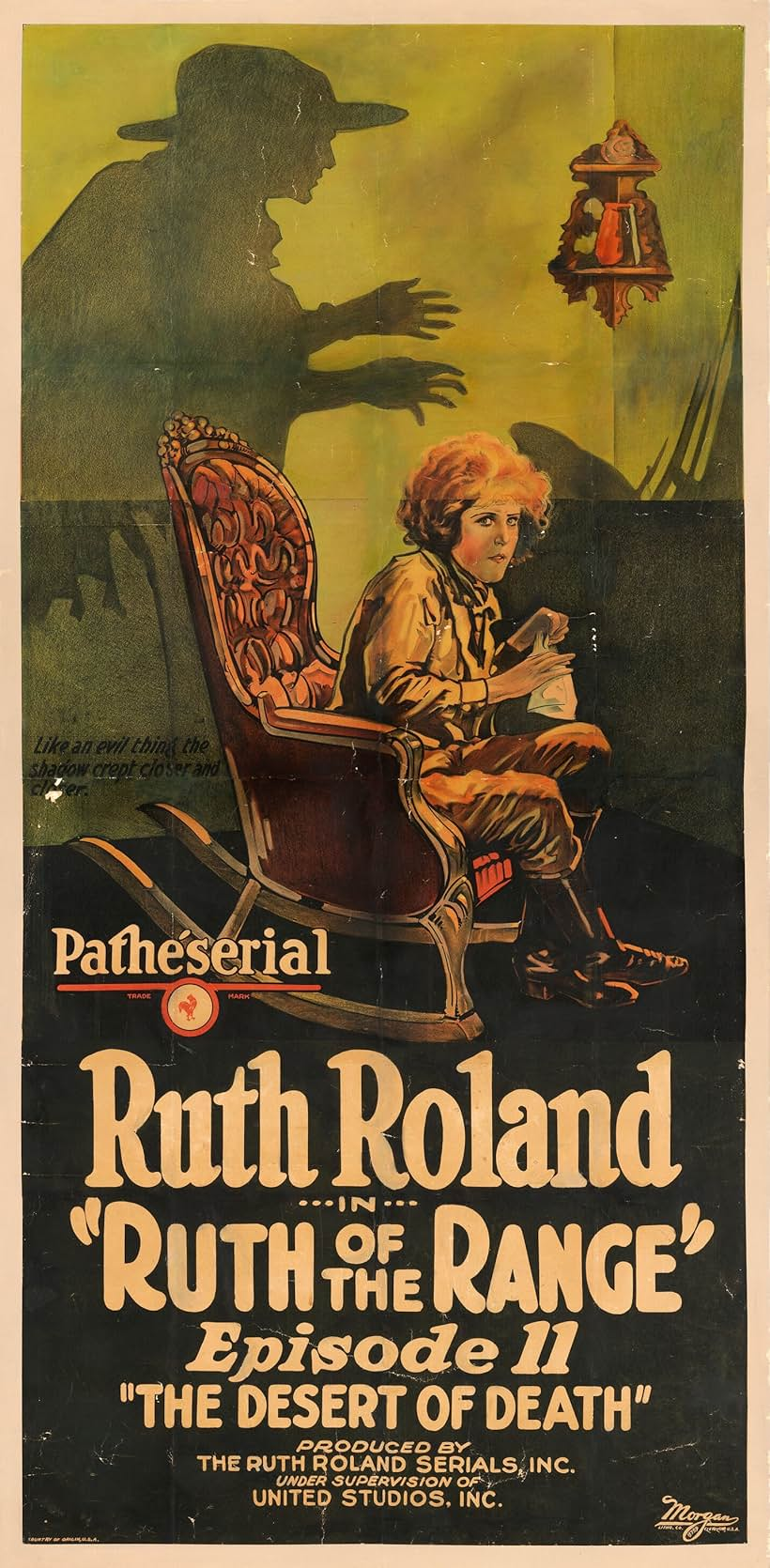
- Episode 11 poster
- Directed by: Ernest C. Warde
- Written by: John W. Grey
- Produced by: Gilson Willets, Frank L. Smith, M. C. Levee
- Starring: Ruth Roland; Bruce Gordon
- Cinematography: Allen Q. Thompson
- Edited by: Richard C. Currier; Lena Hali
- Production companies: Ruth Roland Serials, Inc. United Studios Inc.
- Distributed by: Pathé Exchange
- Release dates: October 14, 1923 (to); January 20, 1924
- Country: United States
- Language: Silent (with English intertitles)

Ruth of the Range is a fifteen episode American adventure film serial starring Ruth Roland, in which a young woman attempts to rescue her father from a gang that has kidnapped him in order to find out his secret for making "Fuelite," a substitute for coal. The film was the final feature created by scenarist Gilson Willets for Pathe Productions, and is now thought to be a lost film.

== Episodes ==
1. The Last Shot
2. The Seething Pit
3. The Danger Trail
4. The Terror Train
5. The Temple Dungeon
6. The Pitfall
7. The Fatal Count
8. The Dynamite Plot
9. The Lava Crusher
10. Circumstantial Evidence
11. The Desert of Death
12. The Vital Test
13. The Molten Menace
14. Cancelled Orders
15. Promises Fulfilled

== Cast ==
- Ruth Roland ... Ruth Remington
- Bruce Gordon ... Bruce Burton
- Lorimer Johnston ... Peter Van Dyke
- Ernest C. Warde ... Robert Remington
- Pat Harmon ... Jim Stain
- Andrée Peyre ... Judith
- Harry De Vere ... J. Hamilton Camp
- V. Omar Whitehead ... Captain X

== Production ==
The series had three directors: the credited director was Ernest C. Warde, son of famed actor Frederick Warde, and was reportedly fired for filming too many close-ups of Roland; his replacement, W. S. Van Dyke, soon quit for another job; and Frank Leon Smith was hired to complete the serial. Gillets died during filming but before he had completed the script, leaving Smith to create his own story from existing footage. Roland left the feature before filming was complete, so Smith filmed her final scenes using her stuntman, Bob Rose, wearing a wig.

== See also ==
- List of lost films
