= In Every Woman's Life =

1924 film

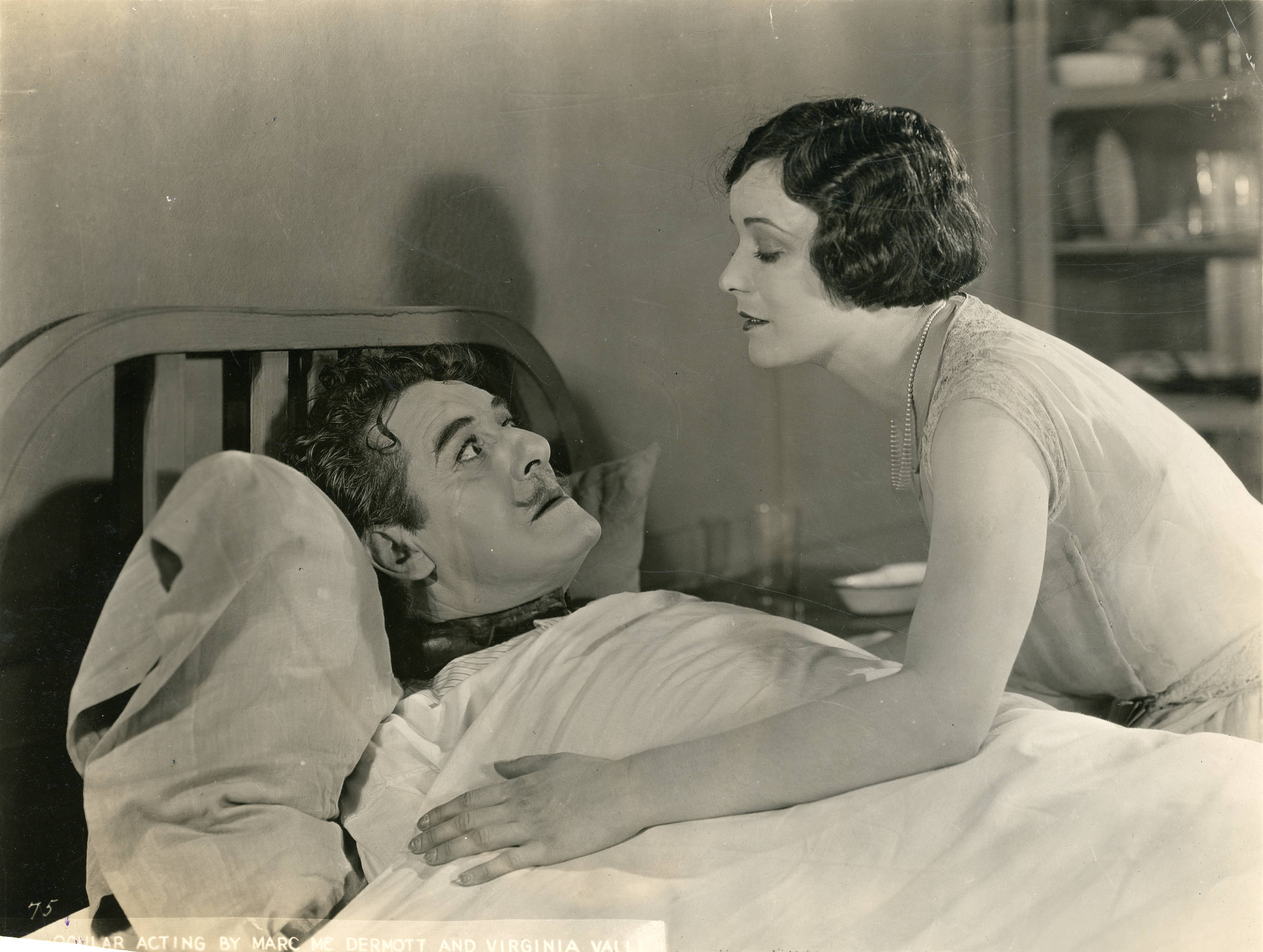
- Still with Marc McDermott and Virginia Valli
- Directed by: Irving Cummings
- Screenplay by: Albert S. Le Vino
- Based on: Belonging by Olive Wadsley
- Produced by: M. C. Levee
- Starring: Virginia Valli; Lloyd Hughes; Marc McDermott; George Fawcett; Vera Lewis; Ralph Lewis
- Cinematography: Arthur L. Todd
- Edited by: Charles J. Hunt
- Production company: Associated First National Pictures
- Distributed by: Associated First National Pictures
- Release date: September 28, 1924
- Running time: 70 minutes
- Country: United States
- Languages: Silent; English intertitles

In Every Woman's Life is a 1924 American silent drama film directed by Irving Cummings and written by Albert S. Le Vino. It is based on the 1920 novel Belonging by Olive Wadsley. The film stars Virginia Valli, Lloyd Hughes, Marc McDermott, George Fawcett, Vera Lewis, and Ralph Lewis. The film was released on September 28, 1924, by Associated First National Pictures.

== Plot ==
As described in a review in a film magazine, Count Coti, wealthy French sportsman whose horse is defeated by one owned by his guest Charles Carlton, an American, arranges for a return match. Both are in love with Sara Langford, Carlton arranges to elope with Sara but due to an accident they just make the ship and Sara expects to be married in America. Coti learns Carlton is married, catches the steamer and to save Sara's name marries her. On board the boat is Julian Greer whom she really loves, and whose grouchy father has broken off the match. Julian in seeking to embrace Sara falls into the sea. Coti dives to his rescue and is hit on the neck by the lifeboat and paralyzed. Arriving in America, Julian and Sara take care of him and tell him his horse won the race, but Carlton comes to collect the winnings, and in full view of Coti tries to attack Sara. Julian comes to her rescue and in the fight Carlton is killed. Sara is arrested but Julian tries to take the blame. Coti, who can neither move or speak, manages by a supreme effort of will to demonstrate that he was able to grasp a pistol in the bed and fire the shot that killed Carlton. This exertion kills him and leaves Sara free to marry Julian.

== Cast ==
- Virginia Valli as Sara Langford
- Lloyd Hughes as Julian Greer
- Marc McDermott as Count Coti Desanges
- George Fawcett as Douglass Greer
- Vera Lewis as Diana Lansdale
- Ralph Lewis as Captain
- Stuart Holmes as Charles Carleton
- John St. Polis as Dr. Philip Logan

== Preservation ==
With no prints of In Every Woman's Life located in any film archives, it is a lost film.
