= Beggarman, Thief =

1977 novel by Irwin Shaw

- Author: Irwin Shaw
- Language: English
- Publisher: Delacorte Press
- Publication date: 15 July 1978
- Publication place: United States
- Media type: Print (hardback & paperback)
- Pages: 512 pp
- ISBN: 0-440-10701-6
- OCLC: 3167032
- Preceded by: Rich Man, Poor Man

Beggarman, Thief is a 1977 novel written by Irwin Shaw. It was a sequel to his 1970 bestseller Rich Man, Poor Man and focuses on the surviving Jordache siblings, Gretchen and Rudolph; their deceased brother Thomas' teenage son Wesley Jordache; and Gretchen's adult son Billy Abbott.

The miniseries adapted from the original novel had a 1976-77 sequel entitled Rich Man, Poor Man Book II, broadcast prior to the publication of Beggarman, Thief and was not based on the second novel.

== Adaptation ==
A 3-hour television adaptation of Beggarman, Thief followed in 1979 on NBC, with different actors playing the same roles as the original ABC miniseries of Rich Man, Poor Man.

Starring

- Jean Simmons as Gretchen Burke, Tom's sister
- Glenn Ford as David Donnelly, Gretchen's producer
- Tovah Feldshuh as Monika Wolner, Billy's lover
- and Andrew Stevens as Billy Abbott, Gretchen's son, replacing James Carroll Jordan from the original miniseries sequel

Special guest stars

- Lynn Redgrave as Kate Jordache, Tom's widow, replacing Kay Lenz from the original miniseries
- Bo Hopkins as Bunny Dwyer, Tom's first mate
- and introducing Tom Nolan as Wesley Jordache, Tom's son, replacing Gregg Henry from the original miniseries sequel

Other guest stars include Jean-Pierre Aumont, Dr. Joyce Brothers, Alex Cord, Anne Francis, Michael Gazzo, Marcel Hillaire, Anne Jeffreys, Christian Marquand, Robert Sterling, Susan Strasberg and Norbert Weisser.
