= Rich Man, Poor Man (novel) =

1969 novel by Irwin Shaw

- First edition
- Author: Irwin Shaw
- Language: English
- Publisher: Delacorte Press
- Publication date: September 1970
- Publication place: United States
- Media type: Print (hardback)
- Pages: 629 pp
- ISBN: 0-385-28858-1
- OCLC: 94537
- Followed by: Beggarman, Thief

Rich Man, Poor Man is a 1969 novel by Irwin Shaw. It is the last of the novels of Shaw's middle period before he began to concentrate, in his last works such as Evening In Byzantium, Nightwork, Bread Upon The Waters and Acceptable Losses on the inevitability of impending death. The title is taken from the nursery rhyme "Tinker, Tailor". The novel was adapted into a 1976 miniseries.

== Background ==
The novel is a sprawling work, with over 600 pages, and covers many of the themes Shaw returns to again and again in all of his fiction – Americans living as expatriates in Europe, the McCarthy era, children trying to break away from the kind of life lived by their parents, social and political issues of capitalism, and the pain of relationships. On the very first page Shaw subtly telegraphs the sad ending of the story, in the same way that the first scene of a film will often quote the last scene.

Originally published as a short story in Playboy Magazine, it became an international bestseller when published as a novel. The bulk of the novel concerns the three children of German Americans Mary Pease and Axel Jordache – the eldest, Gretchen, the middle child, Rudolph, and the youngest, Thomas. It chronicles their experiences from the end of World War II until the late 1960s.

== Plot summary ==
In the early parts of the novel Shaw goes to great lengths to make the point about "Jordache blood" – violent, bitter, resentful. One of the ways he does this is by meticulously describing the hate-filled marriage of the parents, Mary and Axel. The novel is told in the third person omniscient point of view but never wholly objectively, often through the lens of the consciousness of one of the five family members. When told through the POV of either Mary or Axel the view of humanity, and of the Jordache family, is relentlessly bleak and pessimistic.

The tripwire that sets all of the ensuing plot action in motion occurs when Gretchen Jordache begins an affair with the president of the company she works for, Teddy Boylan, a man much older than herself. Eventually her brothers Rudolph and Thomas also become involved with Boylan, in different ways, and it is his influence upon all three that first springs each of them into the world beyond the small upstate New York town where their parents scrape by with their bakery. Boylan constitutes their first true encounters with an adult beyond their parents.

Many people, mainly because of their familiarity with the miniseries rather than the actual source material, thought of the story as a very simplistic juxtaposition of the virtuous, goody two shoes brother (Rudolph) with the black sheep, ne'er-do-well younger sibling (Thomas, whom Shaw seeks to differentiate psychologically by means of a physical symbol – he is the only blond haired member of the family), but the novel is much more complex than this in its demonstrative understructure. For example, Rudolph is constantly developing positive relationships only with people who can help him - his father, Mr. Calderwood, Johnny Heath, Boylan. In stark contrast to this both Gretchen and Thomas consistently entangle themselves with the kinds of people that modern self-help literature calls "drain people" or "toxic people". A couple of examples: Thomas' only friend in the world, Claude, gives him up immediately to the authorities the second his own well-being is threatened, and when Axel Jordache learns of Tom's actions his only impulse is to get rid of him, to send him away to live with family in Ohio. Contrast this with Rudolph's friend, Johnny Heath, who becomes his lifelong friend, attorney, and business partner, and also with what Axel Jordache does when confronted by Rudolph's French teacher over a behavior miscue – he slaps the teacher in the face.

Boylan serves as the MacGuffin that drives the plot for all three of the Jordache siblings. For Gretchen he is an introduction to the world of men and relationships. He awakens in her the realization that she is the kind of woman who reduces men to cowering wimps but who cannot, perhaps somewhat paradoxically, put together a sound, completely fulfilling relationship. Her marriage to Willie Abbott collapses under the weight of his alcoholism and her marriage to Colin Burke ends in tragedy when Burke dies in a car accident. Similarly none of her numerous affairs bear any genuine emotional fruit.

It is because of Boylan that Thomas embarks on a savage act of vandalism (with his friend Claude, who eventually turns him in). When caught, the men of the town present Axel Jordache with a choice – send Thomas away or let him and the family face the consequences with the law. Jordache sends him away to live with his brother in Ohio, thus beginning a pattern that is repeated over and over and over in the novel: Thomas settles somewhere for a while, does OK for a time, then gets into trouble and has to flee.

Finally Boylan offers to pay for Rudolph to go to college. Although on one level Rudolph despises Boylan as a petty vindictive rich pervert of an old man, he sees another side of him as well - the financially independent man of the world who wants for nothing. Shaw uses Rudolph's even, balanced judgment of Boylan as a counterpoint to the wholly negative, wholly one-sided opinion of him, which both Gretchen and Thomas cling to in their own separate ways.

== Adaptations ==
A 1976 miniseries adaptation of the novel premiered on ABC and starred Peter Strauss as Rudy, Susan Blakely as Julie and Nick Nolte as Tom.

In 1982, an adaptation of Shaw's novel was realised by Lithuanian Film Studios of the Soviet TV.

In 2011, a Turkish drama was also an adaptation of Rich Man, Poor Man with a different twist: in Kuzey Güney miniseries, starring Kıvanç Tatlıtuğ, Buğra Gülsoy and Öykü Karayel, Kuzey was shown as the tough, wild and rebellious son (but inside he was noble and child hearten person) and Güney was shown as an responsible, calm and clean son of a hate-filled couple Sami and Handan Tekinoglu of Istanbul.

== Sequel ==
Shaw released a sequel to the novel titled, Beggarman, Thief in 1977.
