= The Assassin (play) =

1945 play

- Published version of the play
- Original language: English
- Written by: Irwin Shaw
- Genre: Drama
- Setting: Algiers, French Algeria, 1942

Premiere
- Date: March 12, 1945
- Place: Pavilion Theatre, Bournemouth

The Assassin is a 1945 play by the American writer Irwin Shaw. It was inspired by the assassination of the Vichy French official Admiral François Darlan in 1942.

The play premiered at the Pavilion Theatre, Bournemouth before transferring to the Savoy Theatre in London's West End, running for 74 performances between March 22 and June 2, 1945. The original London cast included Henry Oscar, Barry Morse, Leslie Perrins, Charles Quatermaine and Rosalyn Boulter. It was first performed on Broadway at the National Theatre in October of the same year, but lasted for only 13 performances.

== Bibliography ==
- Wearing, J.P. The London Stage 1940-1949: A Calendar of Productions, Performers, and Personnel. Rowman & Littlefield, 2014.
