= Rich Man, Poor Man (miniseries) =

American TV miniseries

- Genre: Drama
- Written by: Dean Riesner
- Directed by: David Greene; Boris Sagal
- Starring: Peter Strauss; Nick Nolte; Susan Blakely; Ed Asner; Dorothy McGuire; Robert Reed
- Theme music composer: Alex North
- Country of origin: United States
- Original language: English
- No. of episodes: 12

Production
- Executive producer: Harve Bennett
- Producers: Jon Epstein; Frank Price
- Editors: Richard Bracken; Douglas Stewart
- Production companies: Harve Bennett Productions; Universal Television

Original release
- Network: ABC
- Release: February 1 – March 15, 1976

Related
- Rich Man, Poor Man Book II

Rich Man, Poor Man is a 1976 American television miniseries based on the 1969 novel of the same name by Irwin Shaw that aired on ABC in one or two-hour episodes mostly on Monday nights over seven weeks, beginning February 1. It was produced by Universal Television and was the second time programming of this nature had been attempted. The first TV miniseries, QB VII, had aired — also on ABC — in 1974. These projects proved to be a critical and ratings success and were the forerunner for similar projects based on literary works, such as Roots and Shōgun. The miniseries stars Peter Strauss, Nick Nolte and Susan Blakely.

The nine-part miniseries won four Primetime Emmy Awards of the 23 for which it was nominated, and won four of its six Golden Globe Award nominations.

It spawned the sequel Rich Man, Poor Man Book II, which aired from September 1976 through March 1977. The network repeated the original series Tuesday nights at 9:00pm from May to June 1977.

== Plot ==
Based on the best-selling 1969 novel by Irwin Shaw, it spans the period 1945 through the late 1960s and follows the divergent career courses of the impoverished German American Jordache brothers. Rudy (Peter Strauss) is the titular rich man, a well-educated and very ambitious entrepreneur who triumphs over his background and constructs a corporate and political empire. Poor man Tom (Nick Nolte) is a rebel who eventually turns to boxing to support himself. Axel and Mary are their parents, and Julie Prescott is Rudy's lifelong sweetheart who eventually marries him.

Later, another important character appears: the dangerous and eccentric Falconetti, lifelong nemesis of the Jordache Brothers, who is intent on killing them.

The first series spans a twenty-year period between 1945 and 1965; the second series begins in 1968. The series became a huge success in the countries that aired it.

== Cast ==
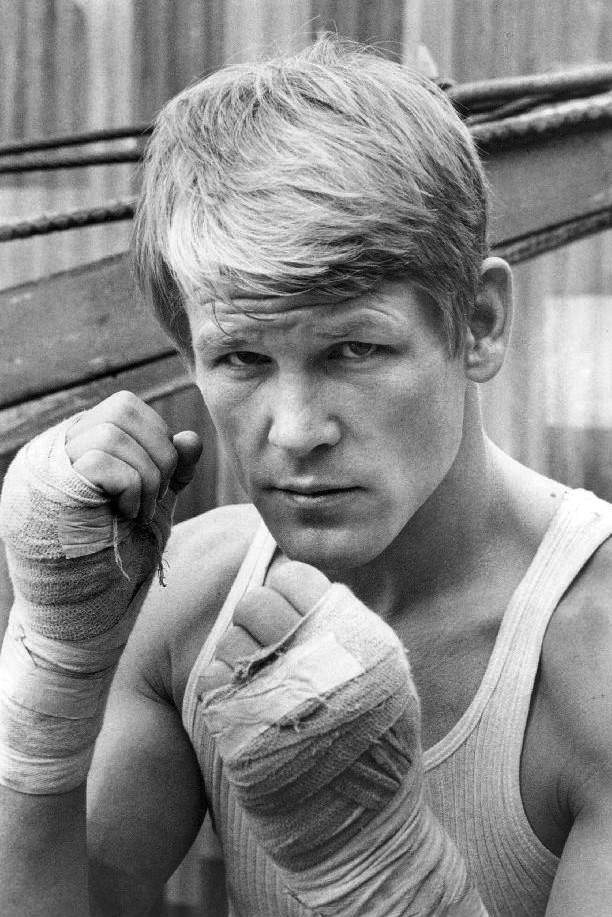
Nick Nolte as Tom Jordache

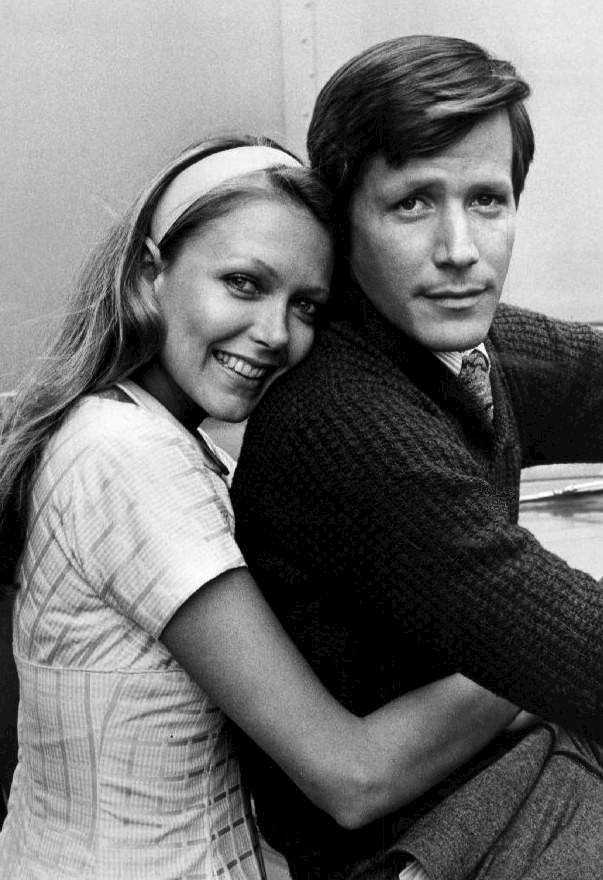
Susan Blakely and Peter Strauss as Rudy Jordache and Julie Prescott

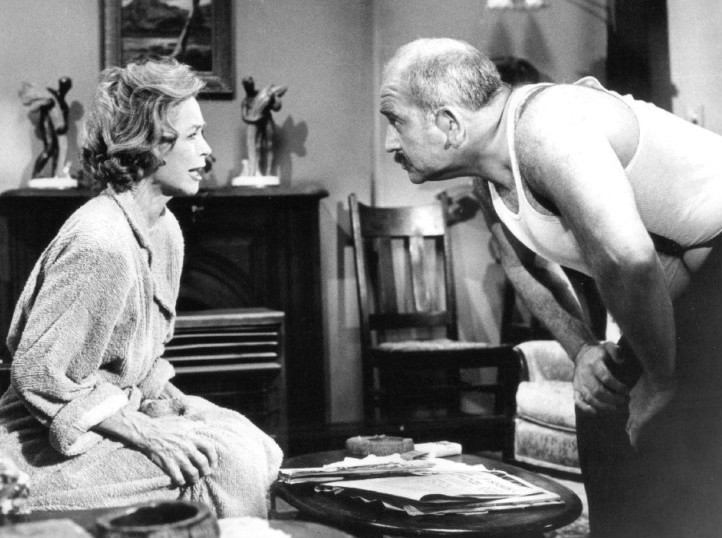
Dorothy McGuire and Ed Asner as Mary and Axel Jordache

=== Main cast ===
- Peter Strauss as Rudy Jordache
- Nick Nolte as Tom Jordache
- Susan Blakely as Julie Prescott

=== Guest stars ===
- Steve Allen as Bayard Nichols
- Edward Asner as Axel Jordache
- Bill Bixby as Willie Abbott
- Dick Butkus as Al Fanducci
- Kim Darby as Virginia Calderwood
- Andrew Duggan as Col. Deiner
- Mike Evans as Arnold Simms
- Norman Fell as Smitty
- Fionnula Flanagan as Clothilde
- Lynda Day George as Linda Quayles
- Gloria Grahame as Sue Prescott
- Murray Hamilton as Sid Gossett
- Julius Harris as Augie
- Herbert Jefferson Jr. as Roy Dwyer
- Van Johnson as Marsh Goodwin
- Kay Lenz as Kate Jordache
- George Maharis as Joey Quayles
- Dorothy Malone as Irene Goodwin
- Leigh McCloskey as Billy Abbott
- Dorothy McGuire as Mary Jordache
- Tim McIntire as Brad Knight
- Ray Milland as Duncan Calderwood
- Lawrence Pressman as Bill Denton
- Robert Reed as Teddy Boylan
- Dick Sargent as Eddie Heath
- Talia Shire as Teresa Santoro
- William Smith as Anthony Falconetti
- Craig Stevens as Asher Berg

== Episode list ==
No.	Title	Directed by	Written by	Runtime	Original release date
1	"Part I: Chapters 1 and 2"	David Greene	Dean Riesner	96 min.	February 1, 1976
2	"Part II: Chapters 3 and 4"	David Greene	Dean Riesner	95 min.	February 2, 1976
3	"Part III: Chapter 5"	Boris Sagal	Dean Riesner	48 min.	February 9, 1976
4	"Part IV: Chapter 6"	Boris Sagal	Dean Riesner	48 min.	February 16, 1976
5	"Part V: Chapter 7"	Boris Sagal	Dean Riesner	48 min.	February 23, 1976
6	"Part VI: Chapter 8"	Boris Sagal	Dean Riesner	48 min.	March 1, 1976
7	"Part VII: Chapter 9"	David Greene	Dean Riesner	48 min.	March 8, 1976
8	"Part VII: Chapter 10"	David Greene	Dean Riesner	48 min.	March 8, 1976
9	"Part VIII: Chapters 11 and 12"	David Greene	Dean Riesner	98 min.	March 15, 1976

== Production notes ==
Dean Riesner wrote all twelve episodes, and direction was shared by David Greene and Boris Sagal. The musical score was composed by Alex North.

== Awards and nominations ==
Award	Category	Nominee(s)	Result	Ref.
Golden Globe Awards	Best Television Series – Drama		Won	
Golden Globe Awards	Best Actor in a Television Series – Drama	Nick Nolte	Nominated	
Golden Globe Awards	Best Actor in a Television Series – Drama	Peter Strauss	Nominated	
Golden Globe Awards	Best Actress in a Television Series – Drama	Susan Blakely	Won	
Golden Globe Awards	Best Supporting Actor – Television	Ed Asner	Won	
Golden Globe Awards	Best Supporting Actress – Television	Josette Banzet	Won	
Grammy Awards	Best Album of Original Score Written for a Motion Picture or Television Special	Rich Man, Poor Man – Alex North	Nominated	
Online Film & Television Association Awards	Hall of Fame – Television Programs		Inducted	
Primetime Emmy Awards	Outstanding Limited Series	Harve Bennett and Jon Epstein	Nominated	
Primetime Emmy Awards	Outstanding Lead Actor in a Limited Series	Nick Nolte	Nominated	
Primetime Emmy Awards	Outstanding Lead Actor in a Limited Series	Peter Strauss	Nominated	
Primetime Emmy Awards	Outstanding Lead Actress in a Limited Series	Susan Blakely	Nominated	
Primetime Emmy Awards	Outstanding Continuing Performance by a Supporting Actor in a Drama Series	Ray Milland	Nominated	
Primetime Emmy Awards	Outstanding Continuing Performance by a Supporting Actor in a Drama Series	Robert Reed	Nominated	
Primetime Emmy Awards	Outstanding Continuing Performance by a Supporting Actress in a Drama Series	Dorothy McGuire	Nominated	
Primetime Emmy Awards	Outstanding Lead Actor for a Single Appearance in a Drama or Comedy Series	Ed Asner (for "Part I: Chapters 1 and 2")	Won	
Primetime Emmy Awards	Outstanding Single Performance by a Supporting Actor in Comedy or Drama Series	Bill Bixby (for "Part V: Chapter 8")	Nominated	
Primetime Emmy Awards	Outstanding Single Performance by a Supporting Actor in Comedy or Drama Series	Norman Fell (for "Part IV: Chapter 7")	Nominated	
Primetime Emmy Awards	Outstanding Single Performance by a Supporting Actor in Comedy or Drama Series	Van Johnson (for "Part VI: Chapter 9")	Nominated	
Primetime Emmy Awards	Outstanding Single Performance by a Supporting Actress in Comedy or Drama Series	Kim Darby (for "Part II: Chapters 3 and 4")	Nominated	
Primetime Emmy Awards	Outstanding Single Performance by a Supporting Actress in Comedy or Drama Series	Fionnula Flanagan (for "Part II: Chapters 3 and 4")	Won	
Primetime Emmy Awards	Outstanding Single Performance by a Supporting Actress in Comedy or Drama Series	Kay Lenz (for "Part VII: Chapters 11 and 12")	Nominated	
Primetime Emmy Awards	Outstanding Directing in a Drama Series	David Greene (for "Part VI: Chapter 10")	Won	
Primetime Emmy Awards	Outstanding Directing in a Drama Series	Boris Sagal (for "Part IV: Chapter 7")	Nominated	
Primetime Emmy Awards	Outstanding Writing in a Drama Series	Dean Riesner	Nominated	
Primetime Emmy Awards	Outstanding Achievement in Art Direction or Scenic Design – Single Episode of a Comedy, Drama or Limited Series	William Hiney and Joseph Stone (for "Part VI: Chapter 9")	Nominated	
Primetime Emmy Awards	Outstanding Achievement in Cinematography for Entertainment Programming for a Series	Howard Schwartz (for "Part I: Chapters 1 and 2")	Nominated	
Primetime Emmy Awards	Outstanding Achievement in Costume Design for a Drama or Comedy Series	Charles Waldo (for "Part I: Chapters 1 and 2")	Nominated	
Primetime Emmy Awards	Outstanding Achievement in Film Editing for Entertainment Programming for a Series – For a Single Episode of a Drama or Limited Series	Richard Bracken (for "Part VI: Chapter 10")	Nominated	
Primetime Emmy Awards	Outstanding Achievement in Film Editing for Entertainment Programming for a Series – For a Single Episode of a Drama or Limited Series	Douglas Stewart (for "Part II: Chapters 3 and 4")	Nominated	
Primetime Emmy Awards	Outstanding Achievement in Music Composition for a Series	Alex North	Won	
TP de Oro	Best Foreign Series		2nd Place	
TP de Oro	Best Foreign Actor	Peter Strauss	Won	
TP de Oro	Most Popular Personage	William Smith	2nd Place	
TV Land Awards	Miniseries You Didn't Miss a Moment Of		Nominated	

== Home media ==
A&E Home Video released an edited version of Rich Man, Poor Man: The Complete Collection on Region 1 DVD in the United States on September 28, 2010.
