= Bury the Dead =

1936 play by Irwin Shaw

- Original language: English
- Written by: Irwin Shaw
- Subject: World War I
- Genre: Expressionist agit-prop
- Setting: "The second year of the war that begins tomorrow."

Premiere
- Date: April 18, 1936
- Place: Ethel Barrymore Theatre, New York City

Bury the Dead (1936) is an expressionist and anti-war drama by the American playwright Irwin Shaw.

== Plot ==
Bury the Dead dramatizes the refusal of six dead soldiers during an unspecified war—who represent a cross-section of American society—to be buried. Each rises from a mass nameless grave to express his anguish, the futility of war, and his refusal to become part of the "glorious past". First the Captain and the Generals tell them it is their duty to be buried, but they refuse. Even a Priest and a Rabbi try to convince them to no avail. Newspapers refuse to print the story in fear it will hurt the war effort. Finally they bring in the women who have survived them, wives, sister and even mother. None succeed in the end.

== Production history ==
Bury the Dead was first staged in New York City in 1936 to great acclaim. It received its British premiere in 1938 at London's Unity Theatre.

== Characters ==
- Private Driscoll
- Private Morgan
- Private Levy
- Private Webster
- Private Schelling
- Private Dean
- Joan Burke
- Bess Schelling
- Martha Webster
- Julia Blake
- Katherine Driscoll
- Elizabeth Dean
- Three Generals
- Captain
- Sergeant
- Four Soldiers on Burial Detail
- Priest
- Rabbi
- Doctor
- Reporter
- Editor
- Two Whores
- Three Business Men'

== See also ==
- List of plays with anti-war themes
