= John Levee =

American painter (1924–2017)

- John Levee in 1976
- Born: April 10, 1924; Los Angeles, California, U.S.
- Died: January 18, 2017 (aged 92); Paris, France
- Known for: Abstract expressionism
- Website: www.johnlevee.org

John Levee (April 10, 1924 – January 18, 2017) was an American abstract expressionist painter who had worked in Paris since 1949. His father was M. C. Levee.

== Background ==
John Levee drawing 1955, ink on paper 75 × 52.5 cm, in the collection of the Museum of Modern Art, New York

John Harrison Levee received a master's degree in philosophy from UCLA and became an aviator in the Second World War. After the war he decided to stay to work as a painter in Montparnasse. He studied art at the Art Center School in Los Angeles and at Académie Julian in Paris from 1949 to 1951.

His early painting was inspired by the New York School of abstract expressionism, which included Franz Kline, Robert Motherwell, Jackson Pollock, Mark Rothko, Ad Reinhardt, Willem de Kooning and Philip Guston, among others. After a period of hard-edge painting based on geometric abstraction in the 1960s, Levee returned to his more spontaneous abstract expressionist style, often using collage elements with loose brush work typical of lyrical abstraction.

== Reference works in public collections ==
- Kunstmuseum Basel, Basel
- MoMA Museum of Modern Art, New York, New York
- Stedelijk Museum, Amsterdam
- Whitney Museum, New York, New York
- Guggenheim Museum, New York, New York
- Washington Gallery of Modern Art, Washington D.C.
- Centre Georges Pompidou, Paris
- Carnegie Museums of Pittsburgh, Pittsburgh, Pennsylvania
- Haifa Museum, Haifa, Israel
- Tel Aviv Museum of Art, Tel Aviv, Israel
- Baltimore Museum of Art, Baltimore, Maryland
- Phoenix Art Museum, Phoenix, Arizona
- Cincinnati Art Museum, Cincinnati, Ohio
- Dallas Museum of Art Contemporary, Texas
- Amon Carter Museum of American Art, Texas
- Palm Springs Desert Museum, California
- Boca Raton Museum of Art, Florida
- Hirshhorn Museum and Sculpture Garden Washington, D.C.
- Museum of Modern Art André Malraux - MuMa, Le Havre, France
- Musée de l'Hospice Saint-Roch, Issoudun, France
- Toledo Museum of Art, Ohio
- Smart Museum of Art, Chicago
- Harvard Art Museums, Cambridge, Massachusetts

== See also ==
- Modern art
- Abstract art
- Formalism (art)
- Shaped canvas
- Abstract expressionism
- Hard-edge painting
