= Quiet City (play) =

1939 play

- Original language: English
- Written by: Irwin Shaw
- Music by: Aaron Copland

Premiere
- Date: April 16, 1939
- Place: Belasco Theatre
- Directed by: Elia Kazan

Quiet City is a 1939 play by Irwin Shaw. It premiered in April 1939 at the Belasco Theatre on Broadway, but closed after only two performances. The music composed for the play by Aaron Copland became a well-known musical arrangement with the same title.

== Synopsis ==
A lonely Jewish man chooses to denounce his religious and artistic convictions. He changes his name, his job, and his religion, and marries a wealthy woman. However, he is troubled by the memory of his brother playing the trumpet.

According to playwright Irwin Shaw, the theme of the play was meant to explore "the troubled conscience of the middle class that cannot quite reconcile itself to its life in a distraught world."

== Production history ==
The play had been commissioned for the Group Theatre by Harold Clurman and was directed by Elia Kazan.

The leading roles were played by Sanford Meisner and Norman Lloyd, with Frances Farmer as the female lead. Other cast included Morris Carnovsky, J. Edward Bromberg, Karl Malden, Martin Ritt, Ruth Nelson, Leif Erickson, Curt Conway and Roman Bohnen. The set was by Mordecai Gorelik.

Presented in April 1939, the play was dropped after only two Sunday night performances at the Belasco Theatre in New York City. "Quiet City didn't work," wrote Lloyd. "Shaw gave up on it."

Aaron Copland's incidental music for the play later became a well-known composition for trumpet, cor anglais, and string orchestra with the same title, Quiet City. "I find it moving because I was the trumpeter in the play," wrote Lloyd, who played the role of David. "The part was that of a kid wandering around New York, wanting to be a trumpet player like Bix Beiderbecke."
