= The Young Lions (novel) =

1948 novel by Irwin Shaw

- First edition
- Author: Irwin Shaw
- Language: English
- Publisher: Random House
- Publication date: October 1, 1948
- Publication place: United States
- Media type: Print (hardback)
- Pages: 689
- OCLC: 275267

The Young Lions (1948) is a novel by Irwin Shaw about three soldiers in World War II.

== Plot ==
Christian Diestl is at first a sympathetic Austrian drawn to Nazism by despair for his future but willing to sacrifice Jews if necessary. Noah Ackerman is an American Jew facing discrimination. Michael Whitacre is an American WASP who struggles with his lack of direction.

The three have very different wars: Diestl becomes less sympathetic as he willingly sacrifices more and more merely to survive; Ackerman finally overcomes the discrimination of his fellows in the army only to be nearly undone by the horror of the camps; Whitacre, still without meaning in his life, survives them both.

== Themes ==
In a 1953 interview, Shaw commented, "what I was trying to do in The Young Lions was to show the world at a certain point in its history, its good and evil, and as many people as I could crowd into the book struggling through that world, trying to find some reason for trying to stay alive in it". He described the character of the German soldier Christian: "I wanted to show how a man can start out decent, intelligent, well meaning, as so many people in Germany must have been, even in the greatest days of Nazism – and wind up bestialized, almost bereft of humanity, almost dead to the instincts of survival even, as the Germans finally were, by believing in one false thing, which spreads and spreads and finally corrupts them entirely".

Shaw said that, in addition to the three central figures of the novel, he had originally intended to include a fourth, non-human character – a bullet which would act as a link between the other three characters. The novel would follow its origin from when the lead is mined from the ground, through to its manufacture and its journey to ending up in Whitacre's cartridge belt and finally used to kill Diestl in the novel's climax. But Shaw gave up the idea as "unnecessary and grandiose".

== Critical reception ==
Orville Prescott of The New York Times wrote a very positive contemporary review, calling it "the best war novel yet written by an American ... Mr. Shaw is a natural writer. He is an acute observer of men at war. His ear for dialogue is excellent. He gives his major characters an immediate reality that is utterly persuasive." Prescott's only criticisms were that the novel was "much longer than it needs to be" with a few too many minor characters that "slow down his story," and that he found the women characters to be "generally unbelievable."

Kirkus Reviews also praised the novel in 1948, saying "If not directed at a popular level, this is the outstanding novel to have come out of the war, in the universality of its framework, its thoughtfulness, and its writing which is swift, believable and often brilliant".

Jonathan Yardley, writing in 2009 in The Washington Post, identified The Young Lions as one of the four epic American war novels that emerged in the immediate post-war era. The other three were The Naked and the Dead by Norman Mailer (1948), The Caine Mutiny by Herman Wouk (1951) and From Here to Eternity by James Jones (1951). He wrote, "Today, at a remove of well over half a century, it is difficult to conjure the incredible excitement these books created, not merely the sense that the terrible war had inspired fiction of lasting importance but also the belief that the 'Great American Novel' at last was within reach". Yardley wrote that some of Shaw's short stories are minor classics and that portions of The Young Lions approached this level but as a whole, "it is too prolix and flabby to fulfill the high ambitions Shaw obviously had for it". Yardley believes that, like the other three novels mentioned above, Shaw's novel has more value as a document of war than as a literary accomplishment.

Also in 2009, Shaw's novel was included in the British newspaper The Guardian's list of "1000 novels everyone should read".

== Film version ==
The novel was adapted as a film of the same name in 1958 starring Marlon Brando, Montgomery Clift and Dean Martin.

The film, while a success, made some major changes to the original story of Shaw's novel. In the film version, the character of the German soldier Christian is portrayed more sympathetically as a decent man who is deceived, rather than seduced and corrupted, by his country's Nazi rulers. Although the novel's character is increasingly hardened by his experiences and unrepentant to the end, the film's version grows ever more disillusioned and renounces his cause in the final scenes. Another major difference is that in the novel's final confrontation, Christian ambushes the two American soldiers, firing first and killing Noah and then being killed in turn by Michael; in the film, Christian, having thrown away his weapon after witnessing the horrors of a concentration camp, stumbles dazedly into the path of the two GIs and is shot dead on sight. As Bosley Crowther wrote in The New York Times in 1958 in a review of the film, the screen version is "prettier" than the novel and in the former, there is "no noticeable moral difference between the one German and two Americans".

Shaw himself is said to have disliked the changes to his novel in the film version, in particular Brando's sympathetic portrayal of Christian and the playing down of the anti-Semitism that Noah encounters in the original book.

== In popular culture ==
In the classic 1950 Billy Wilder movie Sunset Boulevard, the main male protagonist, Gillis, is seen reading the book.

== See also ==
- 1948 in literature
- The New York Times Fiction Best Sellers of 1948
