= Herbert Mitgang =

American journalist (1920–2013)

- Born: January 20, 1920; Manhattan, New York, U.S.
- Died: November 21, 2013 (aged 93)
- Education: St. John's University

Herbert Mitgang (January 20, 1920 – November 21, 2013) was an American author, editor, journalist, playwright, and producer of television news documentaries.

== Life ==
Born in Manhattan, he graduated with a law degree from what is now St. John's University. While a student he wrote sports articles for The Brooklyn Eagle.

During World War II, he served as an intelligence officer and Army journalist.

== Work ==
During World War II Mitgang served as an army correspondent and became the managing editor of the Oran-Casablanca and Sicily editions of Stars and Stripes, earning six battle stars. After the war he joined The New York Times. During a 47-year career at the newspaper, he served as supervising editor of the drama section of the Sunday edition, was a member of the editorial board for twelve years, was the first deputy editor of the OP Ed page that he helped create, and was the paper's publishing correspondent and a daily book critic until his retirement in 1995. From 1964 to 1967 Mitgang was assistant to the president and executive editor of CBS News and produced several CBS Reports documentaries. He also instructed evening classes in English at City College of New York in 1948–1949 and was a visiting professor at Yale University in 1975–1976. From 1948 to 1949 he was a member of the executive board of the Newspaper Guild of New York. He was a longtime member of, and served as president, of both the Authors League Fund and the Authors Guild. He was a Fellow of the Society of American Historians and a member of the Dramatists Guild of America. Mitgang contributed freelance articles to magazines, wrote several novels and biographies and edited several books. His papers are in the collection of the New York Public Library.

Mitgang was one of the original named plaintiffs in "Authors Guild vs. Google" (2005), the purpose of which was to prevent Google from providing a complete searchable index of extant literature.

== Books ==
- "Lincoln As They Saw Him" (1956) ASIN B000RQENP0
- "Washington, D.C. in Lincoln’s Time" (1958) (Noah Brooks/Mitgang Ed.)
- "Civilians Under Arms: The Stars & Stripes - Civil War to Korea" (Ed., with intro by) (1959) ASIN B000R0HKS8
- "The Return" (1959) ASIN B000KBJCFI
- "The Man Who Rode The Tiger: The Life And Times of Judge Samuel Seabury" (1963) ASIN B000PV42I0
- "The Letters of Carl Sandburg" (Ed.) (1968) ASIN B0016KMQ0K
- "America at Random: Topics of The Times" (Ed.) (1969) ASIN B000SATTOK
- "Working for the Reader: A Chronicle of Culture, Literature, War and Politics in Books from the 1950s to the Present" (1970) ISBN 978-0-8180-1155-9
- "Abraham Lincoln: A Press Portrait" (1971) SBN 8129-0170-3
- "Spectator of America" (1971) (Edward Dicey/Mitgang Ed.) ISBN 978-0-8203-1172-2
- "Get These Men Out of the Hot Sun" (1972) ISBN 0-87795-035-0
- "The Fiery Trial - A Life of Lincoln" (1974) ASIN B000HKOFYA
- "The Montauk Fault" (1982) ISBN 978-0-345-30378-3
- "Kings in the Counting House" (1983) ISBN 0-87795-424-0
- "Dangerous Dossiers: Exposing the Secret War Against America's Greatest Authors" (1988) ISBN 978-0-517-07474-9
- "Words Still Count with Me: A Chronicle of Literary Conversations" (1995) ISBN 0-393-03880-7
- "Once Upon a Time in New York: Jimmy Walker, Franklin Roosevelt, and the Last Great Battle of the Jazz Age" (2000) ISBN 978-0-8154-1263-2
- "Newsmen in Khaki: Tales of a World War II Soldier Correspondent" (2004) ISBN 978-1-58979-094-0

== Plays ==
- "Mister Lincoln" (1982) ISBN 0-8093-1034-1 (produced in many venues including the Morosco Theater on Broadway and Ford's Theater in Washington, D.C., and appeared on public television)
- "Adlai, Alone" (premiered in McLean County Museum of History, Bloomington, IL, 2004)

== TV Documentaries ==
- While at CBS News, Mitgang wrote and produced documentaries including: "Carl Sandburg: Lincoln's Prairie Years;" "Anthony Eden on Vietnam;" “Henry Moore: Man of Form;” and "D-Day Plus 20 Years: Eisenhower Returns to Normandy."

== Magazine articles ==
- Mitgang's articles and book reviews have appeared in The New Yorker, The New York Times Magazine, The Nation, The Progressive, Atlantic Monthly, Harper's, Town and Country, Newsweek, American Heritage, Military History Quarterly and Art News. His articles in The New Yorker included profiles of publisher Helen Wolff and Admiral Gene LaRocque, and an article on how the FBI secretly gathered dossiers on writers and artists.

== Awards and honors ==
- George S. Polk Career Award (1992)
- American Bar Association Silver Gavel Awards (1964, 1969); Certificates of Merit (1970, 1973)
- Society of the Silurians 25-year News Achievement Award (1993)
- Literary Lions Award, NY Public Library (1988)
- Barondess/Lincoln Award, Civil War Roundtable of New York (1981)
- NY State Bar Association Media Award (1976)
- Newspaper Guild of NY Human Rights Award (1958)
- Decorated as a Knight, Order of Merit, by the president of the Italian Republic for writings on Italian culture and literature

== Family ==
Mitgang was married to Shirley (b. Kravchick), with whom he had a son, Lee, and two daughters: Esther who died in 2007, and, Laura.

== Death ==
Mitgang died from complications of pneumonia.
