= Michael Shnayerson =

American journalist (born 1954)

Michael Beahan Shnayerson (born December 2, 1954) is an American journalist and contributing editor for Vanity Fair magazine. He is the author of several books and over 75 Vanity Fair stories since 1986. Two of his pieces for the magazine have been developed into films.

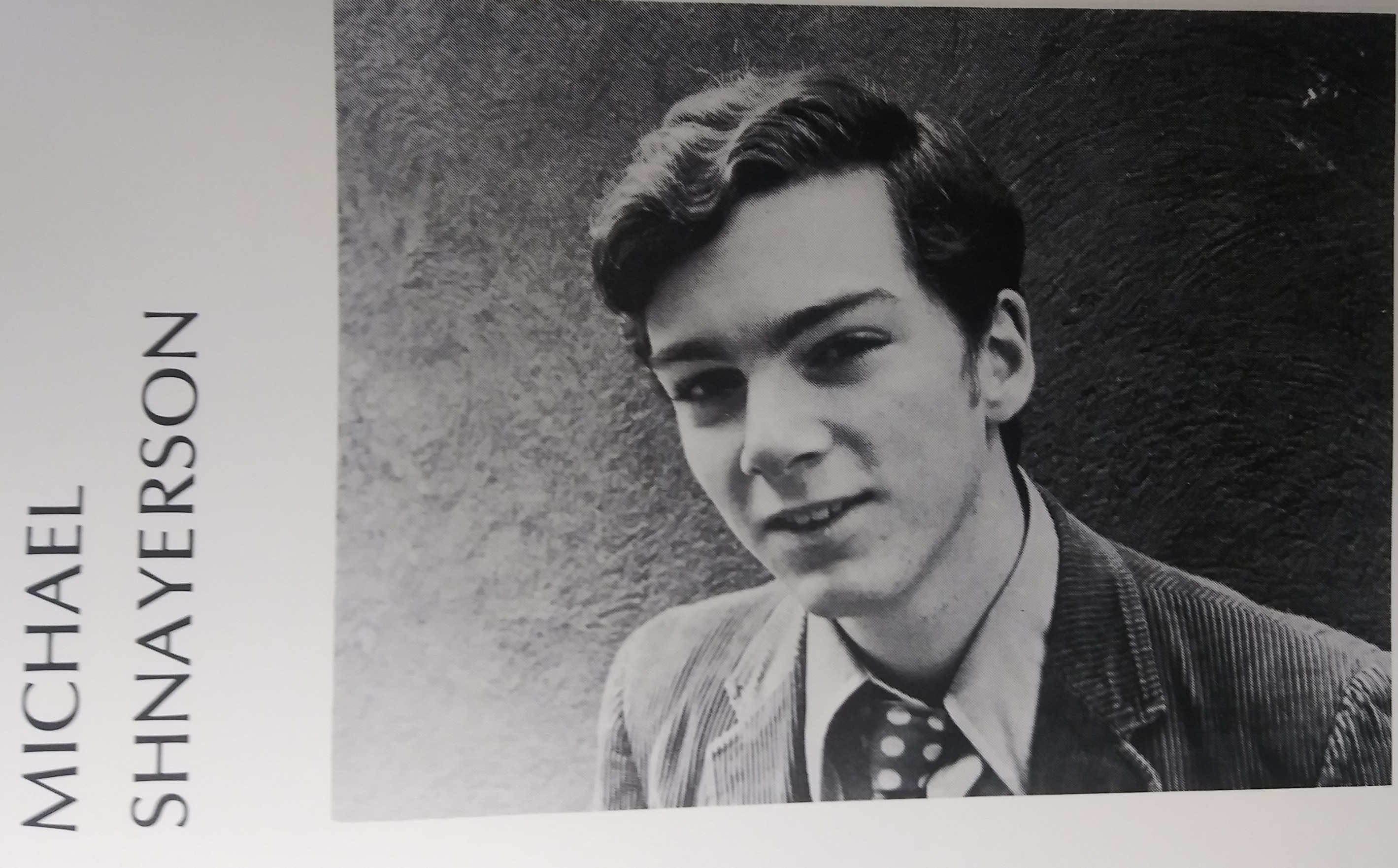
Shnayerson's photo as a high school senior in the 1972 Collegiate yearbook

== Career ==
His career started as a sportswriter for the weekly The Santa Fe Reporter in 1977 before moving on to become a staff writer for Time magazine, focusing on environmental stories, in 1978.

In 1980, Shnayerson became the editor-in-chief of AVENUE magazine, a glossy monthly distributed to upper-income households in New York and Los Angeles. In 1986, he became a staff writer at Vanity Fair and went on to publish more than 75 feature stories for the magazine over the next three decades, ranging from political pieces to art world intrigue and celebrity cover stories. Also in 1986, joined the launch staff for Condé Nast Traveler, created by famed British editor Harold Evans.

His first book, in 1989, was a biography of Irwin Shaw, prominent novelist and short story writer of the mid-20th century. In 1996, he wrote The Car That Could: The Inside Story of GM's Revolutionary Electric Vehicle, which was named one of the best business books of that year by BusinessWeek. In 2002, he authored The Killers Within: The Deadly Rise of Drug-Resistant Bacteria before writing Coal River: How a Few Brave Americans Took On a Powerful Company - and the Federal Government - to Save the Land They Love in 2008.

Shnayerson's fifth book was a collaborative biography of singer, actor and civil rights activist Harry Belafonte, titled My Song in 2011. In 2016, he wrote The Contender, an unauthorized biography of New York Governor Andrew Cuomo, while his seventh book, BOOM: Mad Money, Mega Dealers, and the Rise of Contemporary Art was released in 2019.

For BOOM, Shnayerson interviewed more than 200 world art figures to write a popular contemporary history of the dealers who helped make the art market. Among them were interviews with all four mega dealers: David Zwirner, Iwan Wirth of Hauser & Wirth, Arne Glimcher of Pace Gallery, and Larry Gagosian.

BOOM begins in the post-World War II period with the rise of abstract expressionism and its nurturing by dealers Peggy Guggenheim, Betty Parsons and Sidney Janis. It continues through Leo Castelli and the Pop Period, on through the 1980s most prominent dealers (Mary Boone, Larry Gagosian, Arne Glimcher) and the neo-expressionists they promoted (Julian Schnabel, Jean-Michel Basquiat, David Salle, Eric Fischl) through the fracturing of styles over the last three decades, and the explosive growth of the global contemporary art market. BOOM is in its fourth printing. Television rights have been sold to producer and talent manager Guymon Casady.

== Background ==
Shnayerson is the son of Robert Shnayerson, a senior editor at Time and editor-chief of Harper's magazine in the 1970s, and the late Lydia Todd Shnayerson, a classical pianist. He attended the Collegiate School in Manhattan, New York from 1960 to 1972, and then attended Dartmouth, where he studied English literature and earned a bachelor of arts degree.

Shnayerson was briefly married to Cynthia Stuart, daughter of actress Mary Stuart, before marrying Cheryl Merser, a fellow writer. He is now married to Gayfryd Steinberg, widow of Saul Steinberg. He has a daughter, Jenna, and divides his time between Manhattan and Sag Harbor, New York.

In 2004, Shnayerson contributed $2,000 to John Kerry.

== Bibliography ==
=== Books ===
- Shnayerson, Michael (1989). Irwin Shaw. New York, NY: Putnam Adult. pp. 447 pages. ISBN 978-0399134432.
- Shnayerson, Michael (1996). The Car That Could: The Inside Story of GM's Revolutionary Electric Vehicle. New York, NY: Random House. pp. 295 pages. ISBN 978-0679421054.
- Shnayerson, Michael (2002). The Killers Within: The Deadly Rise of Drug Resistant Bacteria. New York, NY: Little, Brown. pp. 320 pages. ISBN 978-0316713313.
- Shnayerson, Michael (2008). Coal River: How a Few Brave Americans Took On a Powerful Company - and the Federal Government - to Save The Land They Love. New York, NY: Farrar, Straus and Giroux. pp. 336 pages. ISBN 978-0374125141.
- Shnayerson, Michael (2011). My Song: A Memoir. New York, NY: Knopf. pp. 480 pages. ISBN 978-1455521999.
- Shnayerson, Michael (2015). The Contender: Andrew Cuomo, a Biography. New York, NY: Twelve. pp. 544 pages. ISBN 978-1455521999.
- Shnayerson, Michael (2019). Boom: Mad Money, Mega Dealers, and the Rise of Contemporary Art. New York, NY: PublicAffairs. pp. 464 pages. ISBN 978-1610398404.
