= Irwin Shaw =

American writer (1913–1984)

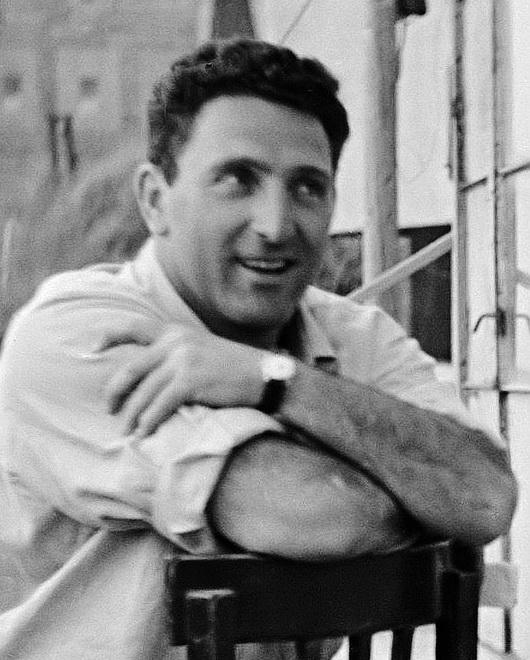
- Shaw in 1948
- Born: Irwin Gilbert Shamforoff; February 27, 1913; The Bronx, New York, U.S.
- Died: May 16, 1984 (aged 71); Davos, Switzerland
- Occupations: Playwright; screenwriter; novelist
- Spouse: Marian Edwards (1916–1996)
- Writing career
- Notable works: Bury the Dead (1936); The Young Lions (1948); Rich Man, Poor Man (1969); Beggarman, Thief (1977)
- Notable awards: O. Henry Award (1944, 1945); National Institute of Arts and Letters Grant (1946); Playboy Award (1964, 1970, 1979); Honorary Doctorate, Brooklyn College
- Website: irwinshaw.org

Irwin Shaw (February 27, 1913 – May 16, 1984) was an American playwright, screenwriter, novelist, and short-story author whose written works have sold more than 14 million copies. He is best known for two of his novels: The Young Lions (1948), about the fate of three soldiers during World War II, which was made into a film of the same name starring Marlon Brando and Montgomery Clift, and Rich Man, Poor Man (1970), about the fate of two brothers and a sister in the post-World War II decades, which in 1976 was made into a popular miniseries starring Peter Strauss, Nick Nolte, and Susan Blakely.

== Personal life ==
Shaw in his CUNY years, c. 1933

Shaw was born Irwin Gilbert Shamforoff in the South Bronx, New York City, to Jewish immigrants from Nizhyn, Ukraine. His parents were Rose and Will. His younger brother, David Shaw, became a noted Hollywood producer and writer. Shortly after Irwin's birth, the Shamforoffs moved to Brooklyn. Irwin changed his surname upon entering college. He spent most of his youth in Brooklyn, where he graduated from Brooklyn College with a Bachelor of Arts degree in 1934.

He began screenwriting in 1935 at age 21. In 1939 he married actress and producer Marian Edwards, daughter of silent film actor Snitz Edwards. The couple divorced in 1967, remarrying two years before Irwin's death in 1984.

During World War II, he was approached by William Wyler to join his film unit. Unable to be commissioned as an officer due to his age and 1-A draft status, Shaw decided to enter the Regular Army. Later, the Army, noting his background, reassigned him to the Signal Corps with George Stevens' film unit. He was one of four writers attached to Stevens' command, in which he became a warrant officer. After the war, he returned to his career as a writer.

Shaw died in Davos, Switzerland on May 16, 1984, at age 71, after undergoing treatment for prostate cancer.

== Career ==
=== Drama ===
In the 1930s, Shaw wrote scripts for several radio shows, including Dick Tracy, The Gumps and Studio One. He recaptured this period of his life in his short story "Main Currents of American Thought," about a hack radio writer grinding out one script after another while calculating the number of words equal to the rent money:

Furniture, and a hundred and thirty-seven dollars. His mother had always wanted a good dining-room table. She didn't have a maid, she said, so he ought to get her a dining room table. How many words for a dining-room table?

Shaw's first play, Bury the Dead (1936), was an expressionist drama about a group of soldiers killed in a battle who refuse to be buried. His play Quiet City, directed by Elia Kazan and with incidental music by Aaron Copland, closed after two Sunday performances.

During the 1940s, Shaw wrote for a number of films, including The Talk of the Town (a comedy about civil liberties), The Commandos Strike at Dawn (based on a C. S. Forester story about commandos in occupied Norway) and Easy Living (about a football player unable to keep playing due to a medical condition). Shaw married Marian Edwards, daughter of well-known screen actor Snitz Edwards. They had one son, Adam Shaw, born in 1950, himself a writer of magazine articles and non-fiction.

Shaw summered at the Pine Brook Country Club, located in the countryside of Nichols, Connecticut, which became the 1936 summer home of the Group Theatre (New York), whose roster included Elia Kazan, Harold Clurman, Harry Morgan, John Garfield, Frances Farmer, Will Geer, Clifford Odets and Lee J. Cobb.

=== Novels and miniseries ===
The Young Lions, Shaw's first novel, was published in 1948. Based on his experiences in Europe during the war, the novel was very successful and was adapted into a 1958 film. Shaw was not happy with the film, feeling it soft-pedaled some of the serious issues from his book, but it did well at the box office.

In 1950 Shaw published Report on Israel, a journalistic book dealing with the situation in the state around the time of its founding with photographs by Robert Capa.

Shaw's second novel, The Troubled Air, chronicling the rise of McCarthyism, was published in 1951. He was among those who signed a petition asking the U.S. Supreme Court to review the John Howard Lawson and Dalton Trumbo convictions for contempt of Congress, resulting from hearings by the House Committee on Un-American Activities. Accused of being a communist by the Red Channels publication, Shaw was placed on the Hollywood blacklist by the movie studio bosses. In 1951 he left the United States and went to Europe, where he lived for 25 years, mostly in Paris and Switzerland. He later claimed that the blacklist "only glancingly bruised" his career. During the 1950s he wrote several more screenplays, including Desire Under the Elms (based on Eugene O'Neill's play) and Fire Down Below (about a tramp boat in the Caribbean).

While living in Europe, Shaw wrote more bestselling books, notably Lucy Crown (1956), Two Weeks in Another Town (1960), Rich Man, Poor Man (1970) (for which he would later write a less successful sequel entitled Beggarman, Thief) and Evening in Byzantium (made into a 1978 TV movie).

Rich Man, Poor Man was adapted into a highly successful ABC television miniseries with six two-hour episodes which aired from February 1 to March 15, 1976. The series ranked third in the seasonal Nielsens and garnered 23 Emmy nominations. A further adaptation, which Shaw had very little to do with, Rich Man, Poor Man--Book II, aired from September 21, 1976, to March 8, 1977. This was not as successful as the first. There was a third sequel Beggar Man, Thief in 1978, which belatedly included the Jordaches' sister Gretchen who had been a prominent character in the original book.

His novel The Top of the Hill (1979) was made into a TV movie about the Winter Olympics at Lake Placid in 1980, starring Wayne Rogers, Adrienne Barbeau, and Sonny Bono.

His last two novels were Bread Upon the Waters (1981), a realist novel dealing with the socioeconomic conditions of 20th-century New York, and Acceptable Losses (1982).

=== Short stories ===
Shaw was highly regarded as a short story author, contributing to Collier's, Esquire, The New Yorker, Playboy, The Saturday Evening Post, and other magazines; and 63 of his best stories were collected in Short Stories: Five Decades (Delacorte, 1978), reprinted in 2000 as a 784-page University of Chicago Press paperback. Among his noted short stories are: "Sailor Off The Bremen", "The Eighty-Yard Run", and "Tip On A Dead Jockey". Three of his stories ("The Girls in Their Summer Dresses", "The Monument", "The Man Who Married a French Wife") were dramatized for the PBS series Great Performances. Telecast on June 1, 1981. This production was released on DVD in 2002 by Kultur Video.

=== Awards ===
During his lifetime Shaw won a number of awards, including two O. Henry Awards, a National Institute of Arts and Letters grant, and three Playboy Awards.

== Major works ==
=== Novels ===
- The Young Lions (1948)
- The Troubled Air (1951)
- Lucy Crown (1956)
- A Preface and Four Seasons (1959) with five signed lithographs by the painter John Levee
- Two Weeks in Another Town (1960)
- Voices of a Summer Day (1965)
- Rich Man, Poor Man (1969/1970) (Portions of this novel first appeared in Playboy in a slightly different form.)
- Evening in Byzantium (1973)
- Night Work (1975)
- Beggarman, Thief (1977)
- The Top of the Hill (1979)
- Bread Upon the Waters (1981)
- Acceptable Losses (1982)

=== Plays ===
- Bury the Dead, New York, Ethel Barrymore Theatre, April 1936.
- Siege, New York, Longacre Theatre, December 1937.
- The Gentle People, New York, Belasco Theatre, January 1939.
- Quiet City New York, Belasco Theatre, March 1939.
- Retreat to Pleasure, New York, Belasco Theatre, 1940.
- Sons and Soldiers, New York, Morosco Theatre, May 1943.
- The Assassin, New York, National Theatre, October 1945.
- The Survivors, (with Peter Viertel) New York, Playhouse Theatre, January 1948.
- Children From Their Games, New York, Morosco Theatre, April 1963.
- A Choice of Wars, Glasgow, Scotland, Glasgow Citizens Theatre, 1967.
