= Yellow Bird =

Yellow Bird may refer to:

== Arts and entertainment ==
- English rendering of the popular Haitian song "Choucoune", first released in 1957 by the Norman Luboff Choir, a 1961 hit for the Arthur Lyman Group
- Yellow Bird (album), a 1961 album by Lawrence Welk and His Orchestra with the above song as a track
- Yellow Bird (company), a Swedish film and television production company
- The Yellow Bird, a 1929 short story by G. K. Chesterton published in The Poet and the Lunatics
- "The Yellow Bird" (short story), a 1947 short story by Tennessee Williams
- The Yellow Bird (film), a 2001 film adaptation of the Tennessee Williams story
- Yellowbird (film), a 2014 film
- A Yellow Bird, a 2016 French-Singaporean film

== People ==
- Yellow Bird, a Sioux medicine man mentioned as instrumental in accounts of the Wounded Knee massacre
- Yellow Bird (chief), chief of the Walla Walla Tribe
- Yellow Bird, alternate name for Cherokee novelist John Rollin Ridge
- Yellow Bird, alternate name for Cherokee politician John Ridge, father of John Rollin Ridge

== Other uses ==
- Operation Yellowbird, a covert operation after the June 4 crackdown in Tiananmen Square in 1989 that helped dissidents flee overseas via Hong Kong
- Yellow warbler, a bird in the genus Setophaga
- Yellow bird (cocktail), a Caribbean, IBA official cocktail
- Northeast Airlines, a US airline
- Ruf CTR, also known as "Yellowbird", a limited production sports car based on the Porsche 911

== See also ==
- The Yellow Birds
- Yellowbirds
