= The Angel in the Alcove =

- Short story by Tennessee Williams
- Country: United States
- Language: English

Publication
- Published in: One Arm and Other Stories
- Publication date: 1948

“The Angel in the Alcove” is a work of short fiction by Tennessee Williams. It first appeared in the collection One Arm and Other Stories, published by New Directions in 1948.

Portions of this story were dramatized in Williams's 1977 play Vieux Carré.

== Plot ==
“The Angel in the Alcove" takes place in a rundown rooming house in the French Quarter of New Orleans. The story is told from a first-person point-of-view, in which the unnamed 20-year-old narrator is a struggling writer. The clientele of the establishment are often destitute, and few can pay their rent regularly. The narrator lives in a garret in the attic, leading a life of quiet desperation.

The landlady is pathologically suspicious of her tenants, monitoring their comings and goings to insure they do not abscond owing debts. She informs them that her cousin (or nephew) is the local police captain. She is particularly hostile towards the narrator, whom she suspects of committing nocturnal crimes in the Quarter: he suffers under her frequent interrogations. One penurious tenant, the widow Mrs. Wayne, is an expert raconteur and uses her talents to momentarily enchant the land lady; by this method, she procures free meals in the kitchen.

When the narrator retreats to his garret at night, an apparition appears in the alcove of the window shortly before he goes to sleep. The figure is that of his deceased grandmother, who had provided him with unconditional love and monetary support. He is comforted by these nocturnal visitations. One night the narrator is awakened by a figure kneeling over his bed: it is the tubercular artist who lives in an adjoining room. The artist declares his ardent love, and the narrator permits him to perform fellatio, after which the ill man withdraws.

Later, a conflict unfolds between the landlady and the sick and alienated artist. Knowing he is dying, he attempts to conceal this reality by complaining that his bedding is infested with bedbugs. The landlady, inspecting the bedclothes, discovers that the sheets are flecked with tiny droplets of blood discharged from his diseased lungs. She ridicules him. His violent outburst leads to the artists’ dismissal from the rooming house. The landlady burns the mattress in the incinerator.

Shortly after this incident, the narrator discovers that the apparition in the alcove has ceased to appear. Nonetheless, he finds he can peacefully fall asleep each night. He takes this as an omen to leave the rooming house, and he quickly abandons his residence, evading the landlady by exiting via the fire escape at night.

== Background ==
“The Angel in the Alcove” was written in Santa Monica, California in October 1943 and first published in the collection One Arm and Other Stories (1948). This “memory story” is told by Williams's “semi-autobiographical narrator” concerning events in his youth living in a tenement building in the French Quarter in the 1930s.

The short story is the partial basis for William's unsuccessful during his lifetime play Vieux Carré(1977). After William's death, Vieux Carre is staged widely in New York City, New Orleans and Provincetown and becomes a fan favorite.

== Theme ==
Literary critic Dennis Vannatat reports that “The Angel in the Alcove” is among a number of stories by Williams that involve “the interpolation of the supernatural into a realist context” or simply “magic realism.”

Stories concerned with “sexual and spiritual liberation would obviously be attractive to Williams, and most of his stories reflect some aspect of this theme.” Literary critic Signi Falk places the story among Williams's key thematic interests:

Stories about derelicts, often sexual deviates, are treated by Williams with sympathy and understanding…one scene describes an early experience in homosexual love between the writer and moribund tubercular [artist].”

The vital importance of his relationship with his paternal grandmother presented as the “Angel” of the story, who sustains him in his suffering while living in his wretched garret. Falk writes:

The "Angel" is the memory of the grandmother who befriended, with both money and love, the young Williams who resisted conventional and boring employment as a shoe clerk so that he could write.

Falk notes that Williams memorialized his grandmother in the dramatization of the story in Vieux Carre (1977), in which “she appears in a picture that is partially spotlighted, as was that of the absent father in The Glass Menagerie (1944).

== Sources ==
- Banach, Jennifer. 2010. “The Critical Reception of the Works of Tennessee Williams.” in Critical Insights: Tennessee Williams. Salem Press, Salem, Massachusetts pp. 21–37 Retrieved 3 December 2023.
- Falk, Signi. 1978. Tennessee Williams. Twayne Publishers, G. K. Hall & Co., Boston, Massachusetts. ISBN 0-8057-7202-2
- Peden, William. 1964. “Mad Pilgrimage: The Short Stories of Tennessee Williams” Studies in Short Fiction, Summer 1964 in Tennessee Williams: A Study of the Short Fiction. 1988 p. 116-122 Twayne Publishers, G. K. Hall & Co., Boston, Massachusetts. ISBN 0-8057-8304-0
- Vannatta, Dennis. 1988. Tennessee Williams: A Study of the Short Fiction. Twayne Publishers, G. K. Hall & Co., Boston, Massachusetts. ISBN 0-8057-8304-0
- Vidal, Gore. 1985. Introduction to Tennessee Williams: Collected Stories, New Directions Publishing, New York. pp. xix-xxv. (Originally appearing in New York Review of Books, 1985) ISBN 0-8112-0952-0
- Williams, Tennessee. 1985. Tennessee Williams: Collected Stories. New Directions Publishing, New York. pp. 120–128 ISBN 0-8112-0952-0
