= Desire and the Black Masseur =

- Short story by Tennessee Williams
- Country: United States
- Language: English

Publication
- Published in: One Arm and Other Stories
- Publisher: New Directions Publishing
- Publication date: 1948

“Desire and the Black Masseur” is a work of short fiction by Tennessee Williams first appearing in the collection One Arm and Other Stories, published by New Directions in 1948.

== Plot ==
The story is told from a third-person omniscient point-of-view from the perspectives of the two protagonists: Anthony Burns, a 30-year-old white wholesale clerk, and an unnamed black masseur who works at a Turkish bathhouse. The two men enter into a sado-masochistic relationship, in which the masseur provides a measure of gratification to his client. Burns, in search of “atonement,” willingly submits to repeated physical assaults; the diminutive clerk achieves sexual climax under the abuse. A perverse adoration and love develops between the two men.The management discovers the abusive relationship and expels them both from the baths.

The relationship briefly persists, until Burns is mortally injured by the beatings. His dying request is that his body be devoured by the masseur. Completing the task, the masseur disposes of the clerk's skeletal remains and moves to another city,

== Critical appraisal ==
Novelist and social critic Gore Vidal, in his Introduction to Tennessee William: Collected Stories (1985) reports that “Tennessee’s stories need no explication. Some are marvelous - [including] ‘Desire and the Black Masseur.’” Calling the story one of Williams’s “most famous” works, literary critic Dennis Vannatta adds this caveat: “Whether or not ‘Desire and the Black Masseur’ deserves its fame is open to debate, [though] there is no questioning it is a major effort.”

In his biography of Williams, Kindness of Strangers (1985), biographer Donald Spoto describes the story as “a celebration of pain and the mute inevitability of self-sacrifice.”

== Theme ==
According to critic Dennis Vannatta, the notability of the story arises largely “from its single-minded pursuit of a theme. One gropes to recall a purer statement of the destructiveness of passion than that dramatized in this story. Every facet of the story serves its theme…the theme actually loses power through its single-mindedness.”

Vannatta describes the story as “expressionistic allegory: the black masseur—the physical agent of Burns’ death—is merely an “abstract agent of retribution” and, as such, any racial motivation for the killing is “shallow and unconvincing…” Literary critic William H. Peden regards the story as a “symbolica excursion,” a tale of atonement delivered by Williams in a “grotesque” and Gothic style involving “hallucination.” Peden concludes that the story is a failure:

Though powerful in its Poe-like totality...the story tends to fall apart as a self-contained piece of fiction. It is not fiction that suggests the universal in terms of the specific; it is undigested and indigestible allegory.”

The "moral dilemma" of the timid Anthony Burns, has a compulsive desire to "atone" for his moral inadequacies and submits to "abusive treatment by others to purge himself of his own guilt." Literary critic Signi Falk comments on the cannibal-like consumption of the clerk's corpse:

[A]fter a twenty-four hour feast, an air of completion returns. There may be for Williams a deep religious symbolism in the connection between homosexuality, cannibalism, and atonement - the crucifiction and resurrection.

Commenting on those plays by Williams that portray “punishment for acts of rejection.” critic Harold Bloom finds these themes “expressed most explicitly” in “Desire and the Black Masseur.”

Admitting that this “fantasy” veers toward the absurd in its narrative, Bloom notes that Williams “nevertheless makes of its hero a broad symbol of human guilt and atonement.”

Literary critic for The New York Times, Reynolds Price comments on the blend of fantasy and reality that suggest Latin literary influence:

By the mid-1940's to early 50's, Williams was attempting stories that, while still grounded in personal experience, abound in the kind of magic realism so widely believed to have originated in Latin America—stories like the outrageous but dead-serious"‘One Arm" and "Desire and the Black Masseur".

== Sources ==
- Falk, Signi. 1978. Tennessee Williams. Twayne Publishers, G. K. Hall & Co., Boston, Massachusetts. ISBN 0-8057-7202-2
- Peden, William. 1964. “Mad Pilgrimage: The Short Stories of Tennessee Williams” Studies in Short Fiction, Summer 1964 in Tennessee Williams: A Study of the Short Fiction. 1988. pp. 116–122 Twayne Publishers, G. K. Hall & Co., Boston, Massachusetts. ISBN 0-8057-8304-0
- Price, Reynolds. 1985. ‘His Battle Cry Was 'Valor!'” Review of Tennessee Williams: Collected Stories. The New York Times, December 1, 1985. https://archive.nytimes.com/www.nytimes.com/books/98/07/12/specials/price-williams.html Retrieved 3 December 2023.
- Vannatta, Dennis. 1988. Tennessee Williams: A Study of the Short Fiction. Twayne Publishers, G. K. Hall & Co., Boston, Massachusetts. ISBN 0-8057-8304-0
- Vidal, Gore. 1985. Introduction to Tennessee Williams: Collected Stories, New Directions Publishing, New York. pp. xix-xxv. (Originally appearing in New York Review of Books, 1985) ISBN 0-8112-0952-0
- Williams, Tennessee. 1985. Tennessee Williams: Collected Stories. New Directions Publishing, New York. pp. 205–213 ISBN 0-8112-0952-0
