= Tip on a Dead Jockey and Other Stories =

Short story collection by Irwin Shaw

- Title page for Tip on a Dead Jockey and Other Stories (1957)
- Author: Irwin Shaw
- Language: English
- Publisher: Random House
- Publication date: 1957
- Publication place: United States
- Media type: Print (hardback)
- Pages: 242
- OCLC: 287548

Tip on a Dead Jockey and Other Stories is a collection of short fiction by Irwin Shaw published by Random House in 1957.

The stories in this fifth collection are reflective of Shaw's "voluntary exile" in Paris in the post-war years, and the experiences of his fellow American expatriates in Europe. The title piece "Tip on a Dead Jockey" is among Shaw's most admired short stories.

The story was adapted to a film of the same name by Metro-Goldwyn-Mayer in 1957 and starring Robert Taylor and Dorothy Malone.

== Stories ==
Those stories first appearing in a literary magazine are indicated.

- "Tip on a Dead Jockey (The New Yorker, March, 1954)
- "A Wicked Story" (The New Yorker, March 18, 1953)
- "In the French Style" (The New Yorker, January 17, 1953)
- "Peter Two" (The New Yorker, April 19, 1952)
- "Age of Reason" (The New Yorker, May 25, 1946)
- "The Kiss at Croton Falls" (Collier's, May 11, 1956)
- "Then We Were Three" (McCall's, August 1955)
- "The Sunny Banks of the River Lethe" (The New Yorker, February 7, 1953)
- "The Wedding of a Friend"
- "Voyage Out, Voyage Home" (The New Yorker, February 12, 1955)

== Reception ==
Hubert Saal in the Saturday Review regards the collection to be a retreat from Shaw's earlier achievements in short fiction. He describes the stories as uniformly "humorless, unhappy and concerned with failure" and attributes this to Shaw's demoralization by the Cold War and its threat of nuclear annihilation. Saal reserves praise for only two pieces, "And Then There Were Three'" and "A Wicked Story" which are "very good, indeed."

Writing in Midwest Quarterly, critic William Startt notes that in terms of form and style, the stories in Tip on a Dead Jockey are equal in quality to Shaw's early short fiction. Startt adds this caveat:

[T]he old intimate glow and the compassionate analysis of people and themes familiar to both the author and his readers are gone...Often passages in his stories sound more like ersatz (italics) Hemingway than Shaw.

Acknowledging that "Shaw is not a Hemingway imitator," Startt locates the "main fault" in these stories in that they are "too bad to praise and too good to criticize."

== Critical appraisal ==
Literary critic James R. Giles reports that the stories in Tip on a Dead Jockey expose "a disturbing shift in focus and emphasis" in Shaw's thematic concerns. Giles attributes this to Shaw's increasing personal wealth and his association with affluent Americans expatriates in Europe in the post-war period: "t has become commonplace to assert that in leaving America Shaw turned his back on the cultural roots essential to the vitality of his writing." As such, Shaw's work became "less representative" of working class struggles dramatized in works informed by the Great Depression.

== Theme ==
Shaw's "voluntary exile" from the United States and his extended sojourn in Paris, France may have been prompted by The Red Scare and the "McCarthy witch hunts" of the 1950s. Shaw ultimately resided for 25 years in Paris, during which "he began to write a new kind of short story."

Giles notes that "these expatriate stories largely abandon the social protest underlying his earlier fiction." Rather than making overtures to his readership to embrace an enlightened leadership, Shaw abandoned these ideals with the rise of the anti-Communism campaign led by the advocates of McCarthyism in the late 1940s and early 1950s. Giles writes:

[T]he expatriate stories work from a different kind of moral basis; they are very much in the tradition of Henry James in their depiction of innocent Americans bringing harm to themselves or others in sophisticated Europe.

== Sources ==
- Barnes, Bart. 1984. "Irwin Shaw, 71, Prolific American Writer, Dies." The Washington Post, May 17, 1984. https://www.washingtonpost.com/archive/local/1984/05/17/irwin-shaw-71-prolific-american-writer-dies/d55783d9-1709-417e-9640-609cc78a4e57/ Retrieved 15 December 2023.
- Giles, James Richard. 1983. Irwin Shaw. Twayne Publishers, Boston, Massachusetts. G. K. Hall & Co. ISBN 0-8057-7382-7
- Giles, James Richard. 1991. Irwin Shaw: A Study of the Short Fiction. Twayne Publishers, Boston, Massachusetts. G. K. Hall & Co. ISBN 0-8057-8331-8
- Saal, Hubert. 1957. "Disenchanted Men," Saturday Review, August 3, 1957 in Irwin Shaw: A Study of the Short Fiction. Twayne Publishers, Boston, Massachusetts. G. K. Hall & Co. pp. 193–195ISBN 0-8057-8331-8
- Shaw, Irwin. 1957. Tip on a Dead Jockey and Other Stories. Random House, New York. Library of Congress Catalog Card Number 57-5582
- Shnayerson, Michael. 1989. Irwin Shaw: A Biography. G. P. Putnam's Sons, New York. ISBN 0-399-13443-3
- Startt, William. 1961. "Irwin Shaw: An Extended Talent." Midwest Quarterly, Summer 1961 in Irwin Shaw: A Study of the Short Fiction. Twayne Publishers, Boston, Massachusetts. G. K. Hall & Co. pp. 196–202 ISBN 0-8057-8331-8
