= Portrait of a Girl in Glass =

Short story by Tennessee wiliams

- Short story by Tennessee Williams
- Country: United States
- Language: English

Publication
- Published in: One Arm and Other Stories
- Publication date: 1948

“Portrait of a Girl in Glass” is a work of short fiction by Tennessee Williams, first appearing in the collection One Arm and Other Stories published in 1948 by New Directions.

The story is widely cited as a literary and autobiographical portrait from which Tennessee Williams developed his first successful stage play, The Glass Menagerie (1944).

== Plot ==
Written from a first-person point-of-view, the narrative revolves around four characters. Amanda Wingfield is an aging Southern belle whose husband has long ago absconded leaving her to raise two children. They live in a seedy industrial section of St. Louis, Missouri. The eldest is her 20-something daughter Laura, whose social anxieties are such that she stays in her bedroom much of the time, a recluse. Painfully sensitive, she occupies herself with a collection of delicate glass objects while listening to old musical recordings on her victrola, among them “Whispering”, “Sleepytime Gal” and “Dardanella.” Laura reads and rereads portions of Gene Stratton-Porter’s Freckles. Amanda is anxious about Laura’s prospects for marriage, and has forced her to enroll in a secretarial training course. Laura furtively drops out of the class due to her low self-esteem.

Tom (the narrator) is her younger brother, two years her junior. A struggling writer, he works at a warehouse to support his mother and sister. At his mother’s urging, he brings home a guest from the warehouse, an outgoing and popular manager, Jim. When the young men arrive, Jim introduces himself to Laura, after which she retires to her room, reemerging only when dinner is served. Her mother interrogates Jim, to determine his suitability as a son-in-law. Jim endures this with good cheer.

After dinner, the four retire to the parlor, and Jim begins examining the record collection; he puts “Dardanella” on the victrola. Laura accepts his invitation to dance with him. Amanda is astonished at this unexpected development, and is momentarily stunned and delighted. As the couple dance, Jim casually divulges that he is expecting soon to be married to an out-of-town woman. When Amanda registers dismay, Jim recognizes his faux pas, and graciously departs.

Amanda upbraids Tom for having misled her as to Jim’s status as a suitor. Laura retires to her bedroom, apparently unvexed by the encounter. Tom reports that shortly after this incident, he left home to lead the life of a drifter. He is haunted by the memory of his sister and her glass collection: "hundreds of little transparent pieces of very delicate colors."

== Background ==
Williams began writing the short story while residing in Key West, Florida in February 1941 and completed the work in Santa Monica, California, June 1943. The earliest manifestation of the dramatic version was a one-act play that Williams worked into a movie scenario, The Gentleman Caller, which he submitted to the Hollywood studio MGM in 1943. Several permutations of this literary work were incorporated into The Glass Menagerie, first staged in 1944. A film version of the same name was adapted in 1950 by Warner Bros. studios.

"Portrait of a Girl in Glass" did not appear in print until 1948, when it was included in the collection One Arm and Other Stories.

== Critical appraisal ==
Critic Reynolds Price in The New York Times distinguishes the short story on its own merits: "'Portrait of a Girl in Glass', which prefigures the plot and entire cast of The Glass Menagerie, is as self-contained and piercing as the play." Literary critic Dennis Vannatta identifies Williams's short stories as a significant contribution to that literary form, independent of his work as a playwright:

It is the inevitable fate of Williams’s short fiction to play second fiddle to his plays, but that fate is an exasperating one when a story as fine in its own right as ‘Portrait of a Girl in Glass’ becomes little more than a footnote to achievement in another genre

Vannatta adds “It would be a terrible shame if such a story came to be remembered—if at all—as a mere rough draft for a play, as exquisite as that play is.”

Literary critic William H. Peden argues that, contrary to any claim that Williams “is a sadist who creates his people only to humiliate them” Peden identifies “Portrait of a Girl in Glass” and Williams' concern with “non-exceptional” protagonists. The painfully introverted Laura emerges as “the most appealing character in what still seems to be Williams’s most moving play, The Glass Menagerie.”

Ten years later, in Sewanee Review, Peden would report that “The Field of Blue Children” and “Portrait of a Girl in Glass” and several other from the collection were “as good as anything produced during recent years.”

== Theme ==
“Using neurotic or pathological in connection with Laura may be clinically correct, but such terms seem to violate the spirit of the story. From Tom’s perspective it is the world, not Laura, that is unnatural, pathologically cruel and unfair.”—Dennis Vannatta in Tennessee Williams: A Study of the Short Fiction (1988)

The story represents Williams's early success in depicting socially disaffected women: “Williams first achieved recognition for delineation of feminine outsiders, who appear in the [story] ‘Portrait of a Girl in Glass’...as Amanda Wingfield and her daughter Laura...”

The character of Laura Wingfield as an emotionally vulnerable woman is the most famous incarnation of this social type in Williams’s fiction. Literary critic Dennis Vannatta notes that Williams contrasts the stories’ setting—industrialized St. Louis in the early 20th century—with Laura's preternatural qualities: the position of the typewriter keys “fly from her mind like startled birds”; her social anxieties close “the pedals of her mind”; and Laura appears before gentleman caller Jim “as a tipsy crane of melancholy plumage” with “wing-like shoulders.” Even her surname “Wingfield” attests to this.

Vannatta notes that the richness of the story is deepened in that the narrative is not limited to the “static” condition of Laura, but to the perspective of her brother Tom. His observations of his sister's isolation and suffering reveal her experience as less idiosyncratic and more as a human condition.

== Sources ==
- Bloom, Harold. 1987. Tennessee Williams: Modern Critical Views. Chelsea House Publishers, New York. ISBN 0-87754-636-3
- Falk, Signi. 1978. Tennessee Williams. Twayne Publishers, G. K. Hall & Co., Boston, Massachusetts. ISBN 0-8057-7202-2
- Peden, William. 1964. “Mad Pilgrimage: The Short Stories of Tennessee Williams” Studies in Short Fiction, Summer 1964 in Tennessee Williams: A Study of the Short Fiction. p. 77 Twayne Publishers, G. K. Hall & Co., Boston, Massachusetts. ISBN 0-8057-8304-0
- Price, Reynolds. 1985. ‘His Battle Cry Was 'Valor!'” Review of Tennessee Williams: Collected Stories. The New York Times, December 1, 1985. https://archive.nytimes.com/www.nytimes.com/books/98/07/12/specials/price-williams.html Retrieved 3 December 2023.
- Vannatta, Dennis. 1988. Tennessee Williams: A Study of the Short Fiction. Twayne Publishers, G. K. Hall & Co., Boston, Massachusetts. ISBN 0-8057-8304-0
- Vidal, Gore. 1985. Introduction to Tennessee Williams: Collected Stories, New Directions Publishing, New York. pp. xix-xxv. (Originally appearing in New York Review of Books, 1985) ISBN 0-8112-0952-0
- Williams, Tennessee. 1985. Tennessee Williams: Collected Stories. New Directions Publishing, New York. pp. 110–119 ISBN 0-8112-0952-0
