= Then We Were Three =

- Short story by Irwin Shaw
- Country: United States
- Language: English

Publication
- Published in: McCall’s
- Publication date: August 1955

"Then We Were Three" is a work of short fiction by Irwin Shaw originally appearing in McCall's magazine in 1955 and first collected in Tip on a Dead Jockey and Other Stories (1957) published by Random House. The story was published in the O. Henry collection for 1957

"Then We Were Three" is the basis for the film Three (1969) and starring Sam Waterston and Charlotte Rampling.

== Plot ==
"Then We Were Three" is told from a third-person limited omniscient point-of-view, in which the 22-year-old Minnie Brooks is the focal character.

Three well-to-do American expatriates form a platonic threesome while traveling together in Europe. The boys, Munnie and Bert, are friends from college. Bert is a glib extrovert. They discover the girl, Martha, while visiting the Uffizi art gallery in Florence and she joins them. At the outset the trio agree to suppress any romantic complications that would spoil their comity. They travel from resort to resort in Munnie’s sports car, playing roulette and winning enough to sustain themselves. Bert is a world-wise and cynical extrovert; Munnie appreciates Bert’s glib rhetoric, and passively tolerates his older friend to jocular mockery. Bert acknowledges but disparages Munnie’s moral superiority.

Munnie admits to himself that he is falling in love with the petite, pretty and self-assured Martha. Disaffected from her family, she is content to be a social drifter. Munnie indulges in forlorn fantasies that she might marry him. He suppresses his feelings of jealousy as he perceives that Bert and Martha become increasingly flirtatious with one another.

Sharing a picnic on a beach, the three witness a boating accident. A couple’s small vessel capsizes and the man cries for help. As the man attempts to swim ashore, he appears in danger of drowning. Bert and Martha are content to merely report the matter to the police. Munnie feels compelled to act: he strips naked and plunges into the water. By the time he nears the man, Munnie is dangerously fatigued. Suddenly a fishing boat appears and picks up the near-drowning man and the women clinging to the boat. Munnie, too modest to climb aboard in the nude, declines to be rescued, and barely makes it back to shore. Bert sardonically chastens Munnie for his heroics and Martha giggles as he dresses himself.

At the hotel Munnie collapses in bed. Bert and Martha go to the casino. Late that night he awakens to hear the two enter Martha’s upstairs apartment. Munnie rises from bed and collects his things. He writes a short note to Bert informing him that he is returning to the United States; he makes no reference to Martha. Driving away in his car in the rain, he chides himself for not ending his summer sojourn a day earlier.

== Background ==
The story is based on an amusing incident involving the then editor of The Paris Review, George Plimpton, writer John P. Marquand and Sue Coward, who would later marry Marquand. The minor disaster occurred when the three were traveling in Europe. While on a pier, the trio witnessed a small boat capsizing near shore. The French couple operating the boat called for help. Marquand heroically attempted to swim to them, but all three required rescuing by a nearby fishing boat.

The story was related to Shaw while the three were at a Saint-Jean-de-Luz restaurant in 1953. Biographer Michael Shnayerson reports that Shaw, impressed by the rendering of the incident, retreated to the restroom to furtively record notes from which he would develop the story.

"Then We Were Three" was declined by The New Yorker, a journal that had formerly published numerous short stories by Shaw. Shnayerson remarks that "in tone and style it was a story of unmistakable New Yorker dimensions", yet it was rejected. McCall's accepted the piece for publication in its August 1955 edition.

== Theme ==
James R. Giles places the story among Shaw’s “best expatriate fiction” in which American “innocence” is contrasted with “sophisticated” Europe, similar to the thematic concerns of Henry James. Giles interprets Munnie’s nakedness and the understanding that Bert and Martha have betrayed him as an Adam figure:

He has, in all innocence, tasted of the Tree of Knowledge. One would have to search through a great deal of fiction to find a familiar pattern of symbolism more effectively understated….The story is beautifully told, supported by underlying Garden of Eden imagery, which is both thematically crucial and consistently understated.”

As an “initiation story” Munnie suffers the perfidy of the cynical Bert and Martha’s passive rejection. The once ardent swain, disabused of his innocence, discovers that only he has exhibited fidelity within the menage-a-trois. Giles writes:

Idealistic, responsible Munnie is forced by his companions into an awareness of the world’s carelessness and selfishness. While he is still fighting against the implications of what he has learned, the summer and his youth have indeed come to an end…but his failure is through strength, not weakness.”

Stripped of his delusions, Munnie—in contrast to his companions—emerges fully “as a decent, caring individual.”

== Sources ==
- Giles, James Richard. 1983. Irwin Shaw. Twayne Publishers, Boston, Massachusetts. G. K. Hall & Co. ISBN 0-8057-7382-7
- Giles, James Richard. 1991. Irwin Shaw: A Study of the Short Fiction. Twayne Publishers, Boston, Massachusetts. G. K. Hall & Co. ISBN 0-8057-8331-8
- Shaw, Irwin. 1957. Tip on a Dead Jockey and Other Stories. Random House, New York. Library of Congress Catalog Card Number 57-5582
- Shnayerson, Michael. 1989. Irwin Shaw: A Biography. G. P. Putnam's Sons, New York. Gordon Weaver, editor. ISBN 0-399-13443-3
