= The Night of the Iguana (short story) =

- Short story by Tennessee Williams
- Country: United States
- Language: English

Publication
- Published in: One Arm and Other Stories
- Publisher: New Directions Publishing
- Publication date: 1948

“The Night of the Iguana” is a short story by Tennessee Williams first appearing in the collection One Arm and Other Stories (1948) published by New Directions. Elements of the story provided the basis for Williams's play The Night of the Iguana (1961).

The play was in turn adapted to a film of the same name (1964) directed by John Huston.

== Plot ==
The story is told from a third-person omniscient point-of-view.

Miss Edith Jelkes, a pretty and refined 30-year-old descends from the gentry of the Old South. Her character and motivations derive from a dichotomous heritage: one branch of the family consists of alcoholics and artists, prone to licentiousness; the other branch are socially conservative celibates. Each branch loathes the other. Her persona contains the potential for both, but she remains a spinster. Recently employed as an art instructor at a girls' school, Edith has resigned after suffering a nervous breakdown. She has embraced a peripatetic existence, living frugally on a monthly inheritance of $200.

While traveling in Mexico, Edith sojourns at the Costa Verde Hotel near Acapulco, Mexico. The only other visitors at the hotel are two young men, aged 25 and 30, both writers.

Seeking some sociable interaction, Edith discovers the gentlemen are utterly indifferent to her presence. She finds their behavior offensive, and decides to divine the nature of their close relationship. In frustration, she complains to the hotel manager that their transistor radios are disturbing her efforts at painting. Edith further objects to the men's scanty swimwear on the beach. She is met with derision by the staff. She does not admit to herself that the young men are in a sexual relationship.

A son of the hotel manager captures an iguana—a culinary delicacy in Mexico—and ties it on the string just outside Edith's hotel window. She is outraged by the cruelty to the animal and applies to the men for sympathy. Intoxicated on rum, they express veiled hostility to her intrusion. In an attempt to escape the proximity of the iguana—and to retaliate—Edith announces she is moving into a room directly next to the couple. Both men recognize this as a provocation.

Eavesdropping on the couple, she hears them laughably express contempt for her spying. Edith knocks on their door to confront them. The younger man walks outdoors in disgust, but the older man invites her in. After a brief exchange, he assaults her sexually, but Edith frees herself after a fierce struggle, but not before the man climaxes and discharges his semen on her exposed breast.

Returning to her previous room at the far end of the units, Edith discovers that the Iguana has freed itself or perhaps been released from its tether. Collapsing on the bed, she seeks sleep, but before losing consciousness she gently touches the residue of the semen where she discovers it “adhering to her belly as a light but persistent kiss.”

== Critical appraisal ==
Biographer Dennis Vannatta judges “Night of the Iguana" as “not entirely successful” as short fiction, and lacking “the depth, breadth, and poetic power” of the 1961 play of the same name. He notes that Edith Jelkes, the protagonist of the story, “the first truly memorable female character in Williams’s short fiction” emerges as the “archetypal artist-fugitive” and consistent with the author's thematic concerns. Vannatta allows that “the ending is brilliant and thought-provoking, surely one of Williams’s best.”

== Theme ==
Literary critic William H. Peden writes:

“One can feel sorry for Edith Jelkes, the sex-starved spinster… Like many of Williams’ genteel no-longer-young ladies with a penchant for disaster, Edith is victim of hereditary taints, and to that extent is only partially responsible for her actions.”

Edith’s escape from the attempted rape serves to free her from a prolonged social isolation, which critic Signi Falk terms “the strangling rope of loneliness.” Edith's emancipation occurs “just as the iguana is released.” And: “The themes of disease, homosexuality, loneliness, and frustration are spelled out against the earthy laughter of the local Mexicans; and the sexual act is orchestrated with some fancy rhetoric.”

Literary critic Dennis Vannatta also recognize the metaphorical significance of the iguana: “The iguana’s plight is an obvious (perhaps too obvious) metaphor for Edith’s own…in case there was ever any doubt, we see quite clearly that Edith and the iguana are metaphorically, one.” As the story approaches its climax—in which the older of the two male lovers attempts to rape Edith—the “religious and mythic imagery proliferate.” Edith returns to her room after the traumatic sexual encounter, and discovers that the Iguana has been freed from its tether; a symbolic parallel matching the discovery of herself as a sexual being. In her room, Edith touches the moist residue of semen on her belly:

Her fingers approached it timidly. They expected to draw back with revulsion but were not so affected. They touched it curiously and even pitifully, and did not draw back for a while. Ah life (italics), she thought to herself, and about to smile at the originality of this thought when darkness lapped over the outward gaze of her mind.

Vannatta observes that Edith's trauma, though “horrifying and humiliating” is nonetheless “also quite clearing enriching,” a valuable advance in self-awareness.

== Sources ==
- Falk, Signi. 1978. Tennessee Williams. Twayne Publishers, G. K. Hall & Co., Boston, Massachusetts. ISBN 0-8057-7202-2
- Peden, William. 1974. “Mad Pilgrimage: The Short Stories of Tennessee Williams” Studies in Short Fiction, Summer 1964 in Tennessee Williams: A Study of the Short Fiction. p. 77 Twayne Publishers, G. K. Hall & Co., Boston, Massachusetts. ISBN 0-8057-8304-0
- Vannatta, Dennis. 1988. Tennessee Williams: A Study of the Short Fiction. Twayne Publishers, G. K. Hall & Co., Boston, Massachusetts. ISBN 0-8057-8304-0
- Williams, Tennessee. 1985. Tennessee Williams: Collected Stories. New Directions Publishing, New York. pp. 229–245 ISBN 0-8112-0952-0
