= Tip on a Dead Jockey (story) =

- Short story by Irwin Shaw
- Country: United States
- Language: English

Publication
- Published in: The New Yorker
- Publication date: March 6, 1954

"Tip on a Dead Jockey” is a work of short fiction by Irwin Shaw, originally appearing in The New Yorker on March 6, 1954, and first collected in Tip on a Dead Jockey and Other Stories (1957) by Random House.

The story was immediately purchased by MGM and adapted to film released under the same title in 1957, starring Robert Taylor and Martin Gabel.

== Plot ==
“Tip on a Dead Jockey” is told from a third-person limited-omniscient point-of-view in which Lloyd Barber is the focal character. The story includes a flashback.

Barber is 30-year-old American expatriate living in post-war Paris. Recently divorced and unemployed, he lives in a cheap apartment and is behind on his rent; strapped for money, he is rationing his cigarettes. He has the advantage of being tall, blond and good-looking.

Barber is visited by Maureen, the wife of his friend Jimmy Richardson. Jimmy and Barber were bomber pilots in the same army squadron during the war. She confides to Barber that Jimmy has been out of town on an undisclosed errand for almost a month. She is anxious and hopes Barber will know his whereabouts. Barber demures, but tells her he will make some inquiries. She too is low on funds, and Barber gives the young mother 5000 francs, one-quarter of his cash. Barber makes a number of phone calls, attempting to locate a man named Bert Smith. He visits a number of upscale establishments that he knows the man frequents, but without success.

Flashback...two months previous.

Barber is betting on racehorses at the Auteuil Hippodrome. He vaguely recognizes a well-dressed man who approached him and introduces himself as Bert Smith. As they converse, Barber becomes aware that Smith is familiar with his personal history and financial situation. Smith inquirers as to whether Barber still possesses a pilot’s license; he does.

Barber subsequently meets with Smith at exclusive dinner clubs on the Plaza Athénée. At the racetrack Barber wins a modest amount of money on the older man’s insider tips. Barber suspects he is being evaluated for some purpose and harbors suspicions. Smith arrives unannounced at Barber’s apartment and makes a proposition: how would the younger man like to make $25,000?: Barber is to fly in a new single-engine aircraft and act as a courier, transporting English $1.5 million in banknotes from Egypt and making airdrops at Malta. The smuggling operation is expected to take one month and appears to be well-planned and low-risk, Barber’s doubts persist. Barber contemplates what might to awry, especially the chances of being intercepted by Egyptian authorities and its dire consequences.

Barber meets Smith at the racetrack, still undecided. As they discuss the matter, Jimmy Richardson appears and Barber introduces him to Smith. Jimmy has placed bad bets and is desperate to recoup his losses. Smith tells Jimmy that he and Barber have put money on no. 5, and he hurries off to place his bet. Smith is intrigued to discover that Jimmy was also a WWII pilot.

A tragic accident occurs during the race: horse no. 5 has fallen on the course and the jockey killed. At the moment that Barber realizes he has lost his wager, Jimmy arrives and tells him he was too late to place his bet. While Smith drives the two men home, Barber is haunted by the violent death of the jockey and sees it as a bad omen. He abruptly declines to accept the mission. Disgusted, Smith drives off with Jimmy. Barber spots the two men at the Athenee that evening. He assumes that Smith is interviewing Jimmy to determine if he is a suitable candidate for the smuggling operation. Barber doubts that Jimmy will impress Smith favorably, which he finds reassuring.

End Flashback

Barber fails to locate Bert Smith. He surmises that Jimmy accepted Smith’s offer and, after 32-days incommunicado, has likely perished. He feels partly to blame.

Maureen telephones Barber and asks him to meet him at an upscale hotel; suspecting she has learned the fate of her husband: he dreads the encounter. Maureen greets him effusively, and moments later Jimmy Richardson appears, jubilant. Barber is dumbstruck. Jimmy produces a huge wad of cash and returns Barber’s 5000 franc loan. He makes a toast “to crime” and the trio sip expensive champagne. Barber declines the couple’s offer to join them for a pheasant dinner at an exclusive supper club, and excuses himself. He walks back to his hotel to save the expense of a taxi, and decides to return home to the United States.

== Background ==
Noel Howard, a WWII pilot, shared his wartime experiences with his friend Shaw, describing how he flew shipments of contraband cigarettes to North Africa. Shaw’s protagonist Lloyd Barber is tempted to engage in a similar profitable but risky operation.

In 1957, Random House was preparing to issue a volume of Shaw’s newest short fiction. The publishers, Bennett Cerf and Donald Klopfer, aware that movie version of the story would open soon, they opted to make “Tip on a Dead Jockey” the title story for the collection: Tip on a Dead Jockey and Other Stories (1957).

== Reception ==
Biographer Michael Shnayerson notes that Random House’s decision to capitalize on the release of the film adaption of the story tended to “cheapen” the literary critics’ perceptions of the 1957 short story collection.

Critic Herbert Saal, writing in Saturday Review observed that “Tip on a Dead Jockey” establishes the style and theme for the entire collection it represents. Acknowledging Shaw’s technical skills, Saal discerns a thematic trend he finds troubling: “Shaw leads through weakness, strength. He has given us petty, selfish, disenchanted men and women, motivated by flimsy hunches and superstitions, incapable of action, without any sort of values, without dignity.”

Critic William Pelen, writing in The New York Times, considered “Tip on a Dead Jockey” representative of a general decline in the seriousness of Shaw’s short fiction:

His frequent superficiality, contrivance and glibness are more apparent than they were when Shaw was centering his stories on around fascism, or communism, or war, or racial intolerance...he appears to have become increasingly the victim of his own facility; he seems to have decided to take the cash and let the credit go.

== Critical appraisal ==
Biographer Michael Shnayerson describes the work as “gritty and suspenseful” and “a nearly perfect blend of masterly, artistic fiction and richly commercial storytelling.”

Literary critic James R, Giles reserves high praise for the story, rating it “probably the most critically admired of all his tales of expatriates.” Giles notes that critics were not unanimous as to the story’s merits: “Hubert Saal attacked the story, as well as the entire 1957 collection, as evidence of a new, disturbingly cynical Shaw, and, while skillfully told, it is a cynical unsatisfying work of fiction.”

== Sources ==
- Giles, James R.. 1983. Irwin Shaw. Twayne Publishers, Boston, Massachusetts. G. K. Hall & Co. ISBN 0-8057-7382-7
- Giles, James R. 1991. Irwin Shaw: A Study of the Short Fiction. Twayne Publishers, Boston, Massachusetts. G. K. Hall & Co. ISBN 0-8057-7382-7
- Shaw, Irwin. 1954. Selected Short Stories of Irwin Shaw. The Modern Library, New York. pp. 288–326 Library of Congress Catalog Number: 61-10674
- Shnayerson, Michael. 1989. Irwin Shaw: A Biography. G. P. Putnam’s Sons, New York. ISBN 0-399-13443-3
