= One Arm and Other Stories =

1948 collection of short fiction by Tennessee Williams

- First edition
- Author: Tennessee Williams
- Language: English
- Publisher: New Directions Publishers
- Publication date: 1948
- Publication place: United States
- Media type: Print (hardback)
- Pages: 210
- ISBN: 978-1135114442

One Arm and Other Stories is a collection of short fiction by Tennessee Williams published by New Direction in 1948.

The volume was released the same year that Williams received the Pulitzer Prize for his play A Streetcar Named Desire.

The book was reprinted in 1954 with a cover by Alvin Lustig. In 1956, a Danish language translation edition was published in Copenhagen under the title Englen I Alkoven.

== Stories ==
Those pieces originally published in magazines before being collected in this volume are indicated.

- "One Arm"
- "The Malediction"
- "The Poet"
- "Chronicle of a Demise"
- "Desire and the Black Masseur"
- "Portrait of a Girl in Glass"
- "The Important Thing" (Story, November–December 1945)
- "The Angel in the Alcove"
- "The Field of Blue Children" (Story, September–October 1939)
- "The Night of the Iguana"
- "The Yellow Bird" (Town and Country, Autumn 1947)

== Reception ==
Though granting that Tennessee Williams is "an interesting writer and a sensitive man," and that these eleven works of fiction in the collection are "electrifying," The New York Times critic James Kelly reports: "[E]ven healthy optimism is nearly invisible in the lurid studies of perversion, madness and human decay covered…"

In the Saturday Review, literary critic William H. Peden wrote that Williams "is at his best" in several of the stories:

Tennessee Williams is in a class by himself. Even at his worst he creates magical, terrifying, and unforgettable effects; his only limitations seem to be self-imposed.

Twenty years later, in Sewanee Review, Peden stated that "The Field of Blue Children" and "Portrait of a Girl in Glass" and several other pieces from the collection were "as good as anything produced during recent years."

== Theme ==
"I cannot write any kind of story unless there is at least one character in it for whom I have physical desire."—Tennessee Williams, as reported by biographer Gore Vidal, in the Introduction to Tennessee Williams: Collected Stories (1985)

Literary critic Signi Falk offers this overview of the thematic elements that appear in One Arm and Other Stories:

Some of the stories have the aura of confession. Williams indicates his sympathy for the unfortunate and his fascination for the macabre. He also indicates his own system of values as he rejects workers in favor of ne'er-do-wells and seems to prefer the vagrant of both sexes.

Falk emphasizes that the stories were informed by "Williams' wandering years through sordid rooming houses, on city streets, and on obscure corners where derelicts hide."

== Sources ==
- Bloom, Harold. 1987. Tennessee Williams: Modern Critical Views. Chelsea House Publishers, New York. ISBN 0-87754-636-3
- Falk, Signi. 1978. Tennessee Williams. Twayne Publishers, G. K. Hall & Co., Boston, Massachusetts. ISBN 0-8057-7202-2
- Kelly, James. 1955. "One Arm and Other Stories". The New York Times, January 2, 1955.https://archive.nytimes.com/www.nytimes.com/books/00/12/31/specials/williams-stories55.html Retrieved 27 November 2023.
- Peden, William. 1955. "Broken Apollo and Blasted Dreams". in Saturday Review, January 8, 1955, p. 11, cited in Tennessee Williams: A Study of the Short Fiction. P. 77, Twayne Publishers, G. K. Hall & Co., Boston, Massachusetts. ISBN 0-8057-8304-0
- Peden, William. 1974. "The Recent American Short Story" in Sewanee Review, Fall 1974, p, 725, cited in Tennessee Williams: A Study of the Short Fiction. P. 77, Twayne Publishers, G. K. Hall & Co., Boston, Massachusetts. ISBN 0-8057-8304-0
- Williams, Tennessee. 1985. Tennessee Williams: Collected Stories. New Directions Publishing, New York. ISBN 0-8112-0952-0
- Vannatta, Dennis. 1988. Tennessee Williams: A Study of the Short Fiction. Twayne Publishers, G. K. Hall & Co., Boston, Massachusetts. ISBN 0-8057-8304-0
- Vidal, Gore. 1985. Introduction to Tennessee Williams: Collected Stories, New Directions Publishing, New York. pp. xix-xxv. (Originally appearing in New York Review of Books, 1985) ISBN 0-8112-0952-0
