= The Yellow Bird (short story) =

- Short story by Tennessee Williams
- Country: United States
- Language: English

Publication
- Published in: Town and Country
- Publication date: Autumn, 1947

"The Yellow Bird" is an American short story by Tennessee Williams which first appeared in the magazine Town and Country in 1947 and was first collected in One Arm and Other Stories (1948), published by New Directions.

The themes and characters in the story provided a selected basis for Williams's plays Summer and Smoke (1948) and Eccentricities of a Nightingale (1966).

== Plot ==
The story is told from a third-person omniscient perspective. The focal character is Alma Tutweiler, the daughter of a minister and wife. They live in Arkansas during the 1930s.

Alma's family heritage is mixed: one side the family descends from the stern Puritans of colonial Salem, Massachusetts, the other side tending toward the licentious Anglican Cavaliers. During the Salem witch trials, Alma's direct ancestor, the Reverend Tutweiler, condemned his own wife, Goody Tutweiler, to death after she was accused of communicating with the devil via a yellow bird name "Bobo."

Shortly before her 30th birthday, Alma begins to rebel against her fire and brimstone father. She takes up what the minister considers disgusting and sinful behavior: cigarette smoking, commandeering the family automobile, staying out late with young men. She peroxides her hair. Alma and her father come to blows, and Alma departs her home without regrets for New Orleans, Louisiana. She settles in the French Quarter and resides in a garret on Bourbon Street. Alma takes to prostitution as a vocation without remorse, embracing her cavalier and anti-authoritarian heritage.

When Alma's parents send a young married woman to determine her financial circumstances, the following exchange occurs:

"How do you live?" asked the woman.
"What?" said Alma, innocently.
"I mean how do you get along?"
"Oh," said Alma, "people give me things."
"You mean you accept gifts from them?"
"Yes, on a give-and-take basis," Alma told her.

In time, Alma discovers she is pregnant. She names her son John, after her favorite male client.

The infant begins to display magical powers, toddling out-of-doors and returning to his mother holding precious gems and gold. Alma grows rich. When John reaches manhood the largess ceases and he disappears, but a deep bond between mother and son persists.

Now an aged crone, Alma is visited by the father of her son in an apparition in which he appears as the sea god Neptune, laden with a cornucopia filled with the treasures from a sunken Spanish galleon. He and Alma depart together to his ocean realm. The abandoned fortune is bestowed upon "The Home for the Reckless Spenders."

When the son returns home, he erects a monument to his mother and father. Three figures, one bearing a crucifix, another a cornucopia, and one a Grecian lyre, are mounted together on a leaping dolphin, with the name Bobo inscribed on the mammal's side.

== Critical appraisal ==
Acknowledging its "comic overtones", literary critic Dennis Vannatta regards the piece as merely "the prototype for Williams’s great play Summer and Smoke." The story is "interesting to an extent, but [not] fully enough realized to contribute measurably to Williams's reputation as a short story writer" and concludes the story is "rambling and shallow..."

Critic William H. Peden comments on Williams's inept handling of the comic elements: "The humor in the story 'The Yellow Bird' is more often than not elephantine, the irony ponderous. The narrative method is similarly heavy-handed … which to most contemporary readers are likely to be as objectionable as those of Andrew Trollope." Peden adds that aside from these defects, this allegory serves as "a searing indictment of the cruelty and injustice of the world as the author sees it. Even at their least successful, they have about them the same curious pathos that characterizes Williams' fiction in general."

Critic Signi Falk also emphasizes the "comic narrative" and the protagonist's cheerful abandonment of her Puritan antecedents, in a tale that ends in fantasy.

== See also ==
- The Yellow Bird (film)

== Sources ==
- Falk, Signi (1978). Tennessee Williams. Boston, MA: Twayne Publishers, G. K. Hall & Co. ISBN 0-8057-7202-2.
- Peden, William (1964). "Mad Pilgrimage: The Short Stories of Tennessee Williams" Studies in Short Fiction, Summer 1964 in Tennessee Williams: A Study of the Short Fiction. Twayne Publishers, G. K. Hall & Co., Boston, Massachusetts. pp. 116–122 ISBN 0-8057-8304-0
- Vannatta, Dennis (1988). Tennessee Williams: A Study of the Short Fiction. Boston, MA: Twayne Publishers, G. K. Hall & Co. ISBN 0-8057-8304-0.
- Williams, Tennessee (1985). Tennessee Williams: Collected Stories. New York: New Directions Publishing. pp. 221–228. ISBN 0-8112-0952-0.
