= E. Ruth Anderson =

American musicologist and meteorologist

- Born: Elsie Ruth Anderson; June 23, 1907; Newport, Rhode Island
- Died: November 24, 1989 (aged 82); Boston, Massachusetts
- Education: New England Conservatory of Music
- Occupations: Musicologist, weather observer, and editor

Elsie Ruth Anderson (23 June 1907 – 24 November 1989) was an American musicologist, weather observer, and editor.

== Biography ==
Anderson attended the New England Conservatory of Music from 1924 to 1931, again in 1934, and again from 1940 to 1941. On June 23, 1931, Anderson received a Diploma in Orchestra with a concentration in Violin from the New England Conservatory of Music.

During World War II, Anderson enlisted in the WAVES and trained at the Navy Aerographers School at Lakehurst Maxfield Field, New Jersey. She was assigned first to a Naval Air Station in Indiana and then to the Naval Intelligence Unit in Washington, D.C. After World War II, Anderson continued with that unit, including one year in the United Kingdom. In 1954, Anderson began working for the American Meteorological Society in Boston. For 15 years, she served as News Editor of the Bulletin of the American Meteorological Society. She also wrote a history of the building that houses the AMS – the Harrison Gray Otis House at 45 Beacon Street. While working for the AMS, she compiled and wrote the Contemporary American Composers: A Biographical Dictionary, published in 1977, with a follow-up edition in 1982.

== Published works ==
- Contemporary American Composers: A Biographical Dictionary, G K Hall & Co. (G.K. Hall was acquired by ITT in September 1969 and sold to Macmillan Publishing in 1985; it is now an imprint of Thomson Gale)

1st ed. (1976) (513 pages, 4to); OCLC 2035024
2nd ed. (1982); OCLC 239743664
