= Yellow Bird (album) =

Studio album by Lawrence Welk and His Orchestra
- Released: 1961
- Genre: Easy listening
- Label: Dot

Yellow Bird is an album by Lawrence Welk and His Orchestra. It was released in 1966 on the Dot label (catalog no. DLP-25774). It included the single, "Yellow Bird". The album debuted on Billboard magazine's popular albums chart on August 7, 1961, reached the No. 2 spot, and remained on that chart for 41 weeks

== Track listing ==
Side 1

1. "Yellow Bird" (Bergman, Keith, Luboff) [2:15]
2. "Don't Worry" (Marty Robbins) [2:32]
3. "Goodnight, Irene" (Ledbetter, Lomax) [2:40]
4. "Runaway" (Westover, Crook) [2:25]
5. "Mockin' Bird Hill" (Vaughn) [1:54]
6. "Marianne" (Miller, Dehr, Gilkyson) [2:04]

Side 2

1. "My Love For You" (George Cates) [2:00]
2. "Heartbreak Hotel" (Presley, Axton, Durden) [2:10]
3. "Harbor Lights" (Williams, Kennedy) [2:18]
4. "Love Those Eyes" (George Cates) [2:16]
5. "Loch Lomond" (adapted by George Cates) [2:03]
6. "Juanita" (adapted by George Cates) [2:29]
