= The Yellow Bird (film) =

- Directed by: Faye Dunaway
- Written by: Faye Dunaway
- Based on: The short story by Tennessee Williams
- Produced by: Faye Dunaway
- Starring: Faye Dunaway, James Coburn, Brenda Blethyn, Michael Pitt and Cynthia Watros
- Music by: Marty Stuart
- Release date: 2001
- Running time: 30 minutes

The Yellow Bird is a 2001 American short film adapted by Faye Dunaway from the short story by Tennessee Williams, which was itself twice-adapted by Williams from the play Summer and Smoke and its revision The Eccentricities of a Nightingale. The film was directed by Dunaway and includes Dunaway, James Coburn, Brenda Blethyn, Michael Pitt, and Cynthia Watros as Alma Tutwiler.
