= G. K. Hall & Co. =

American book publisher

- Founder: Garrison Kent Hall
- Successor: Gale (publisher)
- Country of origin: United States
- Headquarters location: Boston, Massachusetts
- Publication types: Books

G. K. Hall & Co. is an American book publisher based in Boston. It was founded sometime in the late 1950s by Garrison Kent Hall (1917–1973), who also had been an accountant. The firm initially, in the late 1950s through the 1960s, produced catalogs, in print and microform, of collections of renowned libraries – notably the New York Public Library. In the 1960s, Betty Jensen Hall’s new marketing strategy increased profits markedly and the firm expanded, producing other library references in the sciences, humanities, fine arts, and music. Beginning in 1971, two years after being acquired by ITT, the firm became a leading pioneer of publishing large-print editions of best-selling fiction and non-fiction books. In 1972 it acquired Gregg Press the scholarly reprint company. In 1973 it acquired Twayne Publishers. In 1989 it acquired Sandak, the art slide publisher. In 1990 it acquired Thorndike Press, its main American large print competitor.

== Succession of ownership ==
G. K. Hall was founded sometime in the 1950s and was incorporated in Massachusetts in December 1962. The company was acquired by ITT in September 1969 and sold to Macmillan Inc. in 1985. In 1990, Macmillan was acquired by Robert Maxwell, and in 1991 its order processing and shipping functions were moved to Riverside, N.J., its editorial and marketing functions distributed to other divisions, and its Boston office was closed. In 1999, G. K. Hall became an imprint of Thomson Gale when Gale acquired its parent, Macmillan Reference USA.

== Selected library references ==
- Bibliographic Guide to Theatre Arts (1976)
- Catalog of the Theatre and drama collections, 1967–1989; OCLC 469347178
- Dictionary Catalog of the History of the Americas, compiled by the New York Public Library, Reference Department, G.K. Hall & Co. (1961); OCLC 845713, 488981404, 562179553, OCLC 235669094

Compiled volumes

Vols. 1–4: A–Cat; OCLC 500228784
Vols. 5-8: Cas–GA; OCLC 500228805
Vols. 17–20: New–Sau; OCLC 500228864
Vols. 21–24: Sav–US; OCLC 500228882
Vols. 25–28: US-Z; OCLC 500228901

Loose compiled volumes

Vol. 1–21; OCLC 479485453

Single volumes

Vol. 1: A–M; OCLC 165125948
Vol. 2: An–Ba; OCLC 165126132
Vol. 3: Be–Brov; OCLC 165126436
Vol. 4: Brow–Car; OCLC 165126450
Vol. 5: Cas–Colt; OCLC 165126458
Vol. 6: Colu–Dec; OCLC 165126463
Vol. 7: Ded–E; OCLC 165126471
Vol. 8: F–Ga; OCLC 165126477
Vol. 9: Ge–Hall; OCLC 165126482
Vol. 10: Halo–Inc; OCLC 165126490
Vol. 11: Ind–Indians; OCLC 165126495
Vol. 12: Indians–J; OCLC 165126505
Vol. 13: K–Linc; OCLC 165126512
Vol. 14: Lind–Mass; OCLC 165126521
Vol. 15: Mast–Mol; OCLC 165126530
Vol. 16: Mom–Nev; OCLC 165126534
Vol. 17: New–O; OCLC 165126542
Vol. 18: P–Pin; OCLC 165126555
Vol. 19: Pio–Reu; OCLC 165126633
Vol. 20: Rev–Sau; OCLC 165126641
Vol. 21: Sav–Sous; OCLC 165126651
Vol. 22: Sout–Teh; OCLC 165126655
Vol. 23: Tei–US, C; OCLC 165126662
Vol. 24: US, D–US, History; OCLC 165126666
Vol. 25: US, History–US, Hy; OCLC 165126673
Vol. 26: US–Vat; OCLC 165126679
Vol. 27: Vau–Wer; OCLC 165126685
Vol. 28: Wes–Z; OCLC 165126693
1st Supplement (1973); OCLC 1611716, 5534553, 642886977
Vol. 1: A–E Brown; OCLC 165126258
Vol. 2: F Brown-Deu; OCLC 165126938
Vol. 3: Dev–Her; OCLC 165126939
Vol. 4: Hes–Lek; OCLC 165126942
Vol. 5: Lel–Nev; OCLC 165126945
Vol. 6: New–Roc; OCLC 165126947
Vol. 7: Rod-US Delaware; OCLC 165126955
Vol. 8: US Dem–US Rur; OCLC 165126965
Vol. 9: US San–Z; OCLC 165126968

- Contemporary American Composers, compiled by E. Ruth Anderson (1907–1989), G.K. Hall & Co.

1st ed. (1976); OCLC 2035024
2nd ed. (1982); OCLC 7795619

== Selected book series ==
- The Asian Literature Bibliography Series
- Bibliographies of New England History
- Critical Essays on American Literature
- Critical Essays on British Literature
- G. K. Hall Large Print Book Series
- G. K Hall Large Print Inspirational Collection
- G.K. Hall Large Print Science Fiction Series
- G. K. Hall Nightingale Series Edition
- G. K. Hall's Agatha Christie Series
- The Gregg Press Science Fiction Series
- Masters of Science Fiction and Fantasy
- Portway Large Print Series
- Professional Librarian Series
- Research Bibliographies in American Literature
- Reference Guides to Literature
- A Reference Publication in Film
- Thorndike Press Large Print Paperback Series
- Twayne's English Authors Series
- Twayne's Music Series
- Twayne's United States Authors Series
- Twayne's World Authors Series
- World Bibliographical Series
- World Cities Series

== Former executives ==
- Garrison Kent Hall (1917–1973), founder
- Betty Jensen Hall (1929-2009), co-owner and VP, comptroller (1960-1971)
- Phillips A. Treleaven (1928–2000), President of G. K. Hall (1970-1978)
- Thomas T. Beeler (1944-), Editor, Gregg Press and Twayne Publishers imprints (1972-1974); Editorial Director, General Publishing (1974-1978); President of G.K. Hall (1978–1991)
- James Diamond, President of G. K. Hall (1991-1993)
- Remo Alphonso Caroselli (1922–1968), Vice President
- Thomas M. Finn, ThD (1924–1999), Editor-in-Chief; later, academic dean at the College of William and Mary
- Elizabeth Buckley Kubik (1938–), Editor, Editor-in-Chief (1968?-1991)
- John F. Curley Sr. (1928–2001), Marketing Director (1970-1977)
